= 1953 in poetry =

Nationality words link to articles with information on the nation's poetry or literature (for instance, Irish or France).

== Events ==
- T. S. Eliot founds the Poetry Book Society in the U.K.
- George Plimpton, Peter Matthiessen and Harold L. Humes found The Paris Review.
- Nuovi Argomenti, an influential Italian literary magazine, founded by Alberto Carrocci and Alberto Moravia in Rome.
- The October issue of Atlantic Monthly magazine in the United States publishes "Perspectives of India", anthologizing poems from India.
- November 5 – Dylan Thomas, on a poetry reading tour of the United States, is admitted to Saint Vincent's hospital in Manhattan in a coma from which he does not recover before his death on November 9.

== Works published in English ==
Listed by nation where the work was first published and again by the poet's native land, if different; substantially revised works listed separately:

=== Australia ===
- Marjorie Pizer, Freedom on the Wallaby : Poems of the Australian People (edited)
- Roland Robinson, Tumult of the Swans
- Judith Wright, The Gateway

=== Canada ===
- Robert Finch, A Century has Roots.
- Irving Layton, Love the Conqueror Worm. Toronto: Contact Press.
- Douglas Le Pan, The Net and the Sword, Canada
- E. J. Pratt, The Titanic, Canada
- Raymond Souster, Shake Hands with the Hangman: Poems 1940-52 Toronto: Contact Press.

=== India, in English ===
- Nissim Ezekiel, Sixty Poems ( Poetry in English ), Bombay
- Harindranath Chattopadhyaya:
  - I Sing of Man and Other Poems ( Poetry in English ), Bombay: People's Publishing House
  - Spring in Winter ( Poetry in English ), Delhi: Atma Ram
- Manjeri Sundaraman Manjeri, Rhapsody in Red ( Poetry in English ),
- Romen, The Golden Apocalypse, Pondicherry: Sri Aurobindo Ashram
- Sri Aurobindo, The Future Poetry, essays on literary criticism, drawing on the author's (also published) views of art and life, (first appeared in the Arya, 1917–1920; later expanded with the author's letters on art, literature and poetry in the Centenary Library edition, Volume 9, 1971)

=== United Kingdom ===
- Charles Causley, Survivor's Leave
- Sir John Betjeman, A Few Late Chrysanthemums
- Louis MacNeice, Autumn Sequel
- Charlotte Mew (died 1928), Collected Poems
- Lewis Spence, Collected Poems
- John Heath-Stubbs, New Poems
- John Heath-Stubbs and David Wright. editors, The Faber Book of Twentieth Century Verse: An Anthology of Verse in Britain 1900-1950, a selection in self-conscious contrast to the Faber Book of Modern Verse
- R.S. Thomas, The Minister

==== Poets in the anthology Images of Tomorrow ====
John Heath-Stubbs edited this volume, published in the United Kingdom, which included poems from these writers: Dannie Abse – Drummond Allison – Eurasia Anderson - William Bell – Thomas Blackburn – Maurice Carpenter - Alex Comfort – Yorke Crompton – N. K. Cruikshank – Keith Douglas – George Every – John Fairfax – G. S. Fraser – John Gibbs – W. S. Graham - F. Pratt Green – J. C. Hall – Michael Hamburger – John Heath-Stubbs – Glyn Jones – Sidney Keyes – Francis King – James Kirkup – Norman Nicholson – I. R. Orton – Michael Paffard – Kathleen Raine – Anne Ridler – Walter Roberts – W. R. Rodgers – Joseph Rykwert – John Smith – Muriel Spark – Derek Stanford – J. Ormond Thomas – W. Price Turner – John Wain – John Waller – Vernon Watkins – Gordon Wharton - Margaret Willy – David Wright

=== United States ===
- Conrad Aiken, Collected Poems
- John Ashbery, Turandot and Other Poems
- W. H. Auden, "The Shield of Achilles" poem first published; his poetry book of the same name will be published in 1955
- Joseph Payne Brennan, The Humming Stair (Big Mountain Press/Alan Swallow imprint)
- Robert Creeley, American published in Europe:
  - The Kind of Act of
  - The Immoral Proposition
- E. E. Cummings, i — six nonlectures from his Charles Eliot Norton Lectures of 1951-1952 (Harvard University Press)
- Richard Eberhart, Undercliff: Poems 1946–1953
- Jean Garrigue, The Monument Rose
- Kenneth Koch, Poems
- Charles Olson:
  - In Cold Hell, In Thicket, published in Origin as its eighth issue
  - Mayan Letters, letters to the poet Robert Creeley, report on the author's research into Mayan hieroglyphs and discuss Olson's ideas on "objectism" in poetry. (criticism)
- Ezra Pound, translator, The Translations of Ezra Pound
- George Santayana, The Poet's Testament, verse drama
- May Sarton, The Land of Silence
- Karl Shapiro, Poems 1940-1953, New York: Random House
- W. D. Snodgrass, Heart's Needle, New York: Knopf
- David Derek Stacton, An Unfamiliar Country: 25 Poems
- Gertrude Stein, Bee Time Vine and Other Pieces (1913–1927), fiction and verse
- Wallace Stevens, Collected Poems
- Melvin Tolson, Libretto for the Republic of Liberia
- David Wagoner, Dry Sun, Dry Wind
- Robert Penn Warren, Brother to Dragons

=== Other in English ===
- James K. Baxter, The Fallen House, New Zealand
- Nissim Ezekiel, Sixty Poems, verses written from 1945 to 1951, India
- Gershon Legman (ed.), The Limerick. 1700 examples with notes, variants and index, collection compiled by an American, published in France

== Works published in other languages ==
=== French language ===
==== Canada, in French ====
- Jean-Guy Pilon, La fiancée du matin: poèmes, Montréal: Éditions Amicitia

==== France ====
- Yves Bonnefoy, Du mouvement et de l'immobilité de douve
- Rene-Guy Cadou, Helene ou le regne vegetal, Volume 2 (see Volume 1 1952), published posthumously (died 1951)
- Maurice Chappaz, Testament du Haut-Rhône, Swiss, French-language
- Andrée Chedid, Textes pour le vivant
- Jean Follain, Territoires
- Philippe Jaccottet, L'Effraie et autres poèmes, the author's first book of poetry to appear in France; publisher: Gallimard
- Saint-John Perse, Vents

=== India ===
In each section, listed in alphabetical order by first name:

==== Kannada ====
- R. S. Mugali, Kannada Sahitya Caritre, a history of Kannada literature, written in that language, up to the 19th century
- Siddayya Puranika, Jalapata, lyrics
- Virasaiva Sahitya Mttu Itihasa, literary history of "Veerashaiva" literature in three volumes

==== Kashmiri ====
- Amir Shah Kreri, Zafar Nama, a masnavi commemorating an episode of Islamic conquest and based on a Persian original; the poem became very popular in some rural areas
- Mohammad Amin Kamil, Saqi Nama, a masnavi
- Rasul Bath ("most probably the same person known now as Rasul Pompur", according to Indian academic Sisir Kumar Das), Ab e Hayat
- Rahman Rahi, Sanavany Saz
- Rasa Javidani, Tuhfa-e bahar, the Urdu-language poet's first book of Kashmiri-language poems

==== Malayalam ====
- Elamkulam Kunjan Pillai, Unninilisandesam, commentary on a 14th-century Manipravala poem
- K. Kittunni Nayar, Mahakavi Vallattol, biography of the poet Vallathol
- Ulloor Paramesvara Ayyar, Kerala Sahitya Caritram, in 1995, Indian academic Sisir Kumar Das called this book the "most comprehensive history of the Malayalam and Sanskrit literatures of Kerala"; published posthumously, in five volumes, starting this year, with the last volume coming out in 1955

==== Other languages of the Indian subcontinent ====
- Ananta Pattanayak, Santisikhar, Oriya
- Felix Paul Noronha, writing in the Konkani dialect of the Marathi language:
  - Kaviyam Jhelo
  - Kristanu Puranatli Vinchovan
- Ghulan Rabbani Taban, editor, Shikast-i zindan, Urdu-language poems about the independence struggle in India and other Asian countries
- Kripal Singh Kasel and Parminder Singh, Punjabi Sahit Di Utpatti Te Vikas, history of Punjabi literature, written in that language
- Lekhnath Poudyal, Tarun-Tapasi, a poem on contemporary affairs written mostly in the Sikharini meter; considered the magnum opus of the author, who calls it a navya kavya; Nepali
- Nagarjun, Yug Dhara, poems on current affairs; Hindi
- Narayan, also known as "Shyam", Rupa maya, a sequence of 16 sonnets on the myth of Visvamitra and Menaka; Sindhi
- Nanuram Samskarta, Samay Vayaro, in blank verse; Rajasthani
- Nidudavolu Venkatarao, Telugu Kavula Caritra, biographical information about many Telugu poets (see also a larger work of the same nature, Daksina Desiyandhra Vangmayamu 1954)
- Nilmani Phookan, Surya Heno Nami Aahe Eyi Nadiadi, Rangiya, Assam: Prakashan Ghar, Assamese-language
- Priyakant Maniar, Pratik, the author's first book of verses; 65 poems Gujarati
- Shri Shrimat Kumar Vyas, editor, Alagojo, anthology of poems by Rajasthani authors
- Sudhindra Nath Datta, Sambarta, called "[o]ne of the major works in modern Bengali poetry", according to Sisir Kumar Das

=== Other languages ===
- Arturo Corcuera, Cantoral, Peruvian writing in Spanish
- Hermann Hesse, Die Gedichte, German

== Awards and honors ==
- Australia: Grace Leven Prize for Poetry: Roland Robinson, Tumult of the Swans
- Canada: Governor General's Award, poetry or drama: The Net and the Sword, Douglas LePan

=== United Kingdom ===
- King's Gold Medal for Poetry: Arthur Waley

=== United States ===
- American Academy of Arts and Letters Gold Medal for Poetry: Marianne Moore
- National Book Award for Poetry: Archibald MacLeish, Collected Poems: 1917-1952
- Pulitzer Prize for Poetry: Archibald MacLeish: Collected Poems 1917-1952
- Bollingen Prize: Archibald MacLeish and William Carlos Williams
- Fellowship of the Academy of American Poets: Robert Frost
- North Carolina Poet Laureate: James Larkin Pearson appointed.

== Births ==
- February 4 – Mahvash Sabet, Persian educator, poet and prisoner of conscience, one of the Baháʼí 7
- February 5 – Giannina Braschi, Puerto Rican-born poet and novelist
- January 7 – Dionne Brand, Canadian poet, novelist, and non-fiction writer born and raised in Trinidad and Tobago before moving to Canada
- January 12 – David Brooks, Australian
- February 18 – Peter Robinson, English
- February 24 – Jane Hirshfield, American poet and translator
- February 27 – Brad Leithauser, American
- May 12 – Neil Astley, English editor
- July 20 – Joseph Bathanti, American poet, novelist and professor; North Carolina Poet Laureate, 2012–2014
- July 29 – Frank McGuinness, Irish playwright, translator and poet
- August 10 – Mark Doty, American
- August 27 – Gjertrud Schnackenberg, American
- August 31 – György Károly (died 2018), Hungarian
- October 1 – John Hegley, English performance poet
- October 20 – Robyn Bolam, English
- November 19 – Tony Hoagland (died 2018), American
- Also:
  - Alison Brackenbury, English
  - Patrick Deeley, Irish
  - Adeeb Kamal Ad-Deen, Iraqi, Arabic language poet living in Australia
  - Antonis Fostieris, Greek
  - Rita Kelly, Irish language
  - Chris Mansell, female Australian poet and publisher
  - Ian McBryde, Canadian-born poet living in Australia

== Deaths ==
Birth years link to the corresponding "[year] in poetry" article:

- February 25 – Mokichi Saitō (born 1882), Taishō period poet of the Araragi school and psychiatrist; father of novelist Kita Morio (surname: Saitō)
- April 6 – Idris Davies (born 1905), Welsh poet, originally writing in the Welsh language, but later exclusively in English
- May 22 – Louis Lavater (born 1867), Australian composer and writer
- May 28 – Tatsuo Hori 堀 辰雄 (born 1904), Japanese, Shōwa period writer, poet and translator (surname: Hori)
- July 16 – Hilaire Belloc, 82 (born 1870), French-born English poet, essayist and travel writer whose "cautionary tales", humorous poems with a moral, are the most widely known of his writings, from burns resulting from a fall into a fireplace
- September 1 – Bernard O'Dowd (born 1866), Australian co-founder of newspaper Tocsin
- September 3 – Shinobu Orikuchi 折口 信夫, also known as Chōkū Shaku 釋 迢空 (born 1887), Japanese ethnologist, linguist, folklorist, novelist and poet; a disciple of Kunio Yanagita, he established an academic field named "Orikuchiism" (折口学, Orikuchigaku), a mix of Japanese folklore, Japanese classics and Shintō religion (surname: Orikuchi)
- November 9 – Dylan Thomas, 39 (born 1914), Welsh poet, from an alcohol-related cerebral incident
- November 30 – Francis Picabia (born 1879), French avant-garde painter, poet and typographer
- December 7 – Helena Jane Coleman (born 1860), Canadian poet
- Also:
  - George Herbert Clarke (born 1873), English-born Canadian academic and writer

== See also ==
- Poetry
- List of poetry awards
- List of years in poetry
