= X (magazine) =

British review of literature and the arts

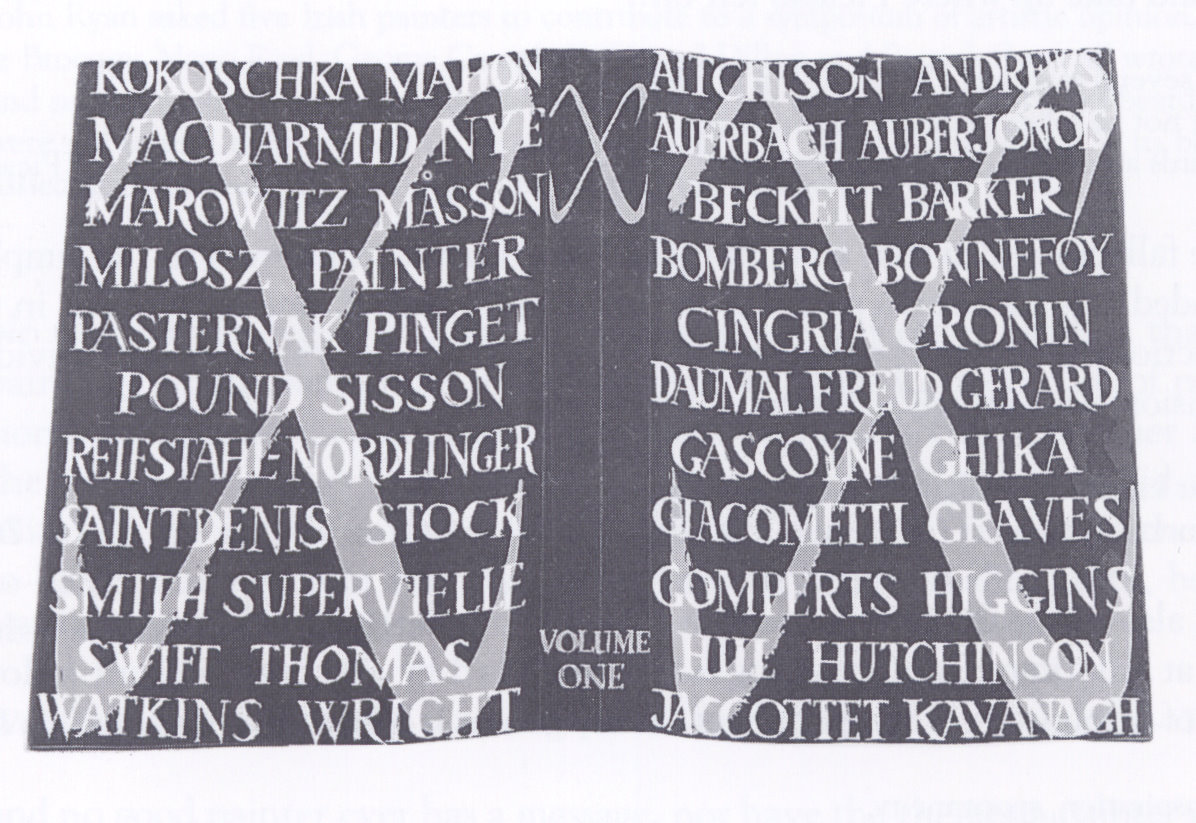
X, Vol I, first four issues, 1961

X, A Quarterly Review, often referred to as X magazine, was a British review of literature and the arts published in London which ran for seven issues between 1959 and 1962. It was co-founded and co-edited by Patrick Swift and David Wright.

== Authors and artists ==
Among the authors and artists included in X are:

Dannie Abse, Craigie Aitchison, Michael Andrews, Frank Auerbach, Francis Bacon, George Barker, Samuel Beckett, David Bomberg, Yves Bonnefoy, Anthony Cronin, René Daumal, Lucian Freud, David Gascoyne, Ghika, Alberto Giacometti, Robert Graves, John Heath-Stubbs, Aidan Higgins, Geoffrey Hill, Philippe Jaccottet, Patrick Kavanagh, Oskar Kokoschka, Malcolm Lowry, Hugh MacDiarmid, Charles Marowitz, Phillip Martin artist, André Masson, John McGahern, O. V. de L. Milosz, Dom Moraes, Robert Nye, Boris Pasternak, Robert Pinget, Ezra Pound, Malcolm Quantrill, Michel Saint-Denis, Martin Seymour-Smith, C. H. Sisson, Stevie Smith, Jules Supervielle, Nathaniel Tarn, and Vernon Watkins.

== Aims and objectives ==
From the foreword to X: Volume I, Numbers 1-4 (Barrie & Rockliff 1961): "...the real thing, the productions of the individual vision... If two things are granted, and they are not often denied, (i) that the productions of the true artist are vital to a healthy society, (ii) that even in the best societies there is the constant risk that these very things will wither and die for want of the minimum support, then the collection of writing, poetry, and art brought together here needs no further apology... There is at the heart of any interesting idea of art or poetry an anarchic volatile centre – a sort of living principle – which will not tolerate categoric definition so that even the wildest of surrealist or anti-art proclamations militate against the sort of freedom the artist values. This does not mean that we exist to initiate a drift from principle and clear proposition. This means that only propositions that are sufficiently accurate to include the necessary complexity of any interesting artistic viewpoint are good enough for us. And that any attitude based upon the notion that there exists a total and rational explanation for the artistic impulse and activity is for us the enemy of real poetry. And so it is that throughout all the critical articles published in this journal will be found a questioning and sceptical curiosity about the prevailing and fashionable conceptions which now dominate the scene... the real enemy now is probably confusion-general; complete intellectual confusion with a prevalent readiness to pounce on anything that looks like a moral issue provided it be simple, accessible, and public enough- in short, safe. If we allow ourselves a convenient division of purpose the first aim, to bring to the light of day the work of the best with qualification that preference be given to the unknown and the neglected or the known but unhonoured, is a clear and basic function which demands absolute precedence, while the second, to question and expose the nature of prevailing and fashionable theory and practice, is a more complex function difficult to perform. The hardest thing that anybody can do is to think for himself, to like something because he likes it and not because he knows or is told that ten or ten thousand or ten million other people do. The artist is a man who experiences for himself and believes in the validity of that experience...They are individuals, not a group; not even a group of individuals. And if they have anything in common it is the seriousness with which they take their art—not that lugubrious dedication... but the apparent frivolity with which they ignore the terrible worries of our time in favour of the apparently selfish delight of creating some image of personal vision, some faint echo of the eternally liberation 'I am'."

== History ==
David Wright's introduction to An Anthology from X: "X, a quarterly review of literature and the arts, flourished, or at any rate existed, between the years 1959 and 1962. It took its name from the algebraic symbol for the unknown quantity—‘incalculable or mysterious fact or influence’ as the Concise Oxford Dictionary defines it. Neither the manifesto nor the editorial introduced the first number: its contents were the manifesto...Through the poet David Gascoyne, Swift had become acquainted with an extraordinary old lady, one of the last survivors of Bloomsbury. This was Mary Hutchinson, a cousin of Lytton Strachey... It had long been her ambition to start a magazine devoted to literature and the arts, and as editors Swift and I seemed to her to be the answer. This was before the days when literary magazines could get financial backing from the Arts Council...However, Mrs Hutchinson and he were confident that she would be able to find a backer for the venture...Our benefactor was Michael Berry [1911–2001], now Lord Hartwell, the owner of the Daily Telegraph. He undertook to guarantee the first four volumes of X, and proved an ideal backer—he never interfered. Indeed, I never even met him...Apart from Swift and myself there was no other staff, for we had determined to cut out all unnecessary expenses...The first number of X was carefully planned, and well received. Philip Toynbee hailed it in the Observer as 'an event, if only because a literary magazine of this kind has not existed for a long time. The admirable impression of a review devoted to attacking both the corruptions of an established avant-garde and the dreary "retrenchments" of the age is reinforced by every article and poem which appear here.' In a leading article the Times Literary Supplement was also laudatory: 'A concern for "rethinking" about the nature of literary and artistic experience is apparent throughout the pages of X, and gives the whole of the first issue a unity uncommon among periodicals now'... About 3,000 of the first number were sold, and the circulation remained at this figure, more or less, until its demise. Much of its impact was due to the layout that Patrick Swift designed, and to its unusual format, which was in fact determined by the dimensions of a menu card in a caff off Victoria Station where we happened to be having a cup of coffee. To begin with, we resolved to avoid insularity. Poems, essays, and graphics by European writers and artists...appeared in our pages... Swift was, of course, responsible for the art side of the magazine. These were the boom years of abstract art. Swift, twenty years ahead of his time...[promoted] the work of then unknown or unfashionable figurative painters, among them the young Frank Auerbach, Michael Andrews, and Craigie Atchison, and such as-yet uncanonized painters as Lucian Freud, Francis Bacon, and the forgotten David Bomberg [To say nothing of the continentals like Kokoschka, Giacometti, André Masson]. Examples of their work were reproduced; more importantly, it was Swift's idea that the artist should speak for themselves, which was achieved either by transcribing their tape-recorded conversation... or by publishing their notes. Swift's unearthing and editing of David Bomberg's outspoken and apocalyptic 'pensées', scattered about his miscellaneous papers, was an outstanding contribution... All exercises in criticism or exegesis published in X were written by practising painters, writers, or poets... Our first two numbers were filled with work by writers and artists we knew, or knew of. But by the time the third number of X appeared we were starting to attract unpublished writers of the kind we were looking for." David Wright in an interview with Poetry Nation: "I received a letter from the Irish painter Patrick Swift [they had first met in Soho in 1953] inviting me to come in with him to edit a new quarterly. The backing was to come via the remarkable Mrs St John Hutchinson. We called the magazine X, after its dictionary definition ‘the unknown quantity’. The actual backer I was never to meet, but through his generosity X was able to pay contributors on the scale of Encounter. The first number came out at the end of 1959, the seventh and last in 1962. We were out to provide a platform for the individual vision, not accepted avant-gardisme or second-hand attitudes. While the list of contributors remained international, from among the native English X managed to recruit at least [three] new poets who certainly would not have been elsewhere given a hearing [ Brian Higgins, C. H. Sisson and Cliff Ashby ]." Other artists that were involved, to a greater or lesser extent, with Wright and Swift in the production of X included Dom Moraes ("co-opted as an unofficial assistant"), David Gascoyne (translator and reviewer of foreign books), Elizabeth Smart and Anthony Cronin (who also wrote under the pseudonym Martin Gerard); in several numbers George Barker, Cronin, Pierre Leyris and Gascoyne are included as correspondents.

PN Review: "Apart from providing a platform for such then-neglected poets as Patrick Kavanagh, George Barker, Stevie Smith and Hugh MacDiarmid, its editors hoped—though not too confidently—to uncover some of the 'unknown quantities' that they knew might be finding it difficult to get into print, either because their ideas and attitudes were not among those currently received, or their verse and prose not cut to the fashion of the day. In this respect the magazine did pretty well, considering its short life... Two novelists—John McGahern and Aidan Higgins—and several now well-known painters, including Frank Auerbach, Michael Andrews, and Craigie Aitchison, were first featured in its pages...But the best justification of the magazine, and of its editors' ambitions, was the discovery, or rather the recognition, of two or three authentic but unpublished—and at that time apparently unpublishable—poets..."

CJ Fox (Canadian journalist and critic): "The contents of the seven issues of X that preceded its demise in 1962 vividly reflect the rebellious spirit that animated Swift's commentaries. From the older generation, Graves was enlisted to flay what he called the official 'trades union' of literature... From Barker came fighting verse excoriating the 'rigor leavis' of the academies while Cronin rounded on 'commitment' in poetry. The voice of the authentic ‘Painting Animal’ was heard from Swift's working colleague Michael Andrews and (out of the ‘dangerous European stew’) from Giacometti and Mason, while Bomberg (still an unfashionable ghost) made a disarming case for drawing as ‘Democracy’s visual sign’. X gave Sisson his first real exposure and Kavanagh, among other mavericks, his full head... Malcolm Lowry, scarcely known in Britain as a poet, sang hauntingly of the drunk man's bathos... Stevie Smith performed at her most unnerving. The purpose behind the whole operation was to nurture the 'anarchic volatile centre' of creativity in the arts and to promote 'the unknown and the neglected or the known but unhonoured'."

Martin Green (writer, editor and publisher) in The Independent: "[X] promoted the work of then unfashionable writers and poets, including Stevie Smith, Hugh MacDiarmid, Patrick Kavanagh and Malcolm Lowry, and discussed the work of similarly unfashionable artists - Alberto Giacometti, Lucian Freud, Francis Bacon, Frank Auerbach and David Bomberg".

Christopher Barker (son of George Barker and Elizabeth Smart, who lived upstairs from Swift) in The Guardian (2006):"On many occasions through the early Sixties, writers and painters such as David Gascoyne, Paddy Kavanagh, Roberts MacBryde and Colquhoun and Paddy Swift would gather at Westbourne Terrace in Paddington, our family home at that time. They came for editorial discussions about their poetry magazine, X." Elizabeth Smart: "The editors of X magazine, Patrick Swift and David Wright, would meet at her flat in the beginning of the sixties to do interviews, and Elizabeth sometimes offered her drawing room as a sort of office where they would hammer out their editorials. The artist Craigie Aitchison recalled being interviewed there by Paddy Swift, and Elizabeth wrote their words down, including the bits from the pub where they adjourned afterwards."

== The editors ==
Patrick Swift was an Irish painter. David Wright a South African-born poet. They met in London in 1953 in the small bar of the Duke of Wellington at the corner of Wardour and Old Compton Street. This was then the favoured rendezvous of the artistic set of poets and painters that made up Soho society. It was at this point that Swift and Wright first discussed the idea of creating a new literary magazine, a quarterly which would publish writing on artistic issues they felt to be of importance. David Wright:

I met Swift in (to quote his words) "the bohemian jungle of Soho, where practitioners of arts and letters were thick on the ground, though not professors of these activities". And in a sense X was born in that Bohemian jungle, a society which, as I now realize, was as extraordinary as it was short-lived.

David Wright had worked for The Sunday Times and edited Nimbus in 1956. Swift had contributed to Nimbus as well as Irish art periodicals, Envoy and The Bell.

== X: Volume One, Number One – Volume Two, Number Three ==
Volume One, Number One, November 1959

- George Barker Circular from America
- Anthony Cronin The Notion of Commitment
- Hugh MacDiarmid Two Poems (Song of the Serapim; Reflections in a Slum)
- Patrick Swift (under the pseudonym James Mahon) Official Art and the Modern Painter
- Frank Auerbach Fragments from a Conversation
- Samuel Beckett L’Image
- Robert Pinget Simultaneously
- Patrick Kavanagh Two Poems (Living in the Country; Lecture Hall)
- Anthony Cronin (under the pseudonym Martin Gerard) Is Your Novel Really Necessary?
- Stevie Smith Two Poems (The Last Turn of the Screw; Thoughts about a Person from Porlock)
- Ghika Contemporary Relations between Painting, Sculpture, Architecture.
- Alberto Giacometti The Dream, the Sphinx, and the Death of T.
- René Daumal A Fundamental Experiment
- David Gascoyne Remembering the Dead
- On The Margin

Reproductions of paintings by Frank Auerbach, and a drawing by Alberto Giacometti.

Volume One, Number Two, March 1960

- Anthony Cronin R.M.S. Titanic
- George Barker How to Refuse a Heavenly House
- Boris Pasternak November Days
- Michel St. Denis Remembering Two Friends (Matthew Smith and Albert Camus)
- Anthony Cronin (under the pseudonym Martin Gerard) Goodbye to All That: A Child's Guide to Two Decades
- Mary Hutchinson Kaleidoscope of Childhood
- Charles-Albert Cingria Green Wood and Dry
- Michael Andrews Notes and Preoccupations
- Oskar Kokoschka Lettre de Voyage
- Poets on Poetry: I
  - Hugh MacDiarmid
  - Vernon Watkins
  - Patrick Kavanagh
  - Stevie Smith
- On The Margin

Reproductions of drawings by Michael Andrews, Oskar Kokoschka and René Auberjonois, and of a painting by Michael Andrews.

Volume One, Number Three, June 1960

- Brian Higgins Five Poems; and Two Poems
- Robert Graves November 5th Address
- Patrick Kavanagh The Flying Moment
- David Bomberg The Bomberg Papers
- H.A. Gomperts Hunting to Live
- André Masson Dissonances
- Marie Riefstahl-Nordlinger On Reading 'Marcel Proust - a Biography'
- George Barker VIII Beatitudes to Denver
- Patrick Swift Prolegomenon to George Barker
- David Wright Adam at Evening
- Poets on Poetry: II
  - Jules Supervielle
  - Yves Bonnefoy
  - Henri Thomas
  - Philippe Jaccottet
- A letter from Derek Hill
- On The Margin

Reproductions of paintings by David Bomberg and drawings by André Masson.

Volume One, Number Four, October 1960

- Ezra Pound Conversations in Courtship; Verse is a Sword: Unpublished Letters
- C. H. Sisson Six Poems
- Charles Marowitz New Wave in a Dead Sea
- Robert Nye Going to the Dogs
- Craigie Atchison Fragments from a Conversation; Three Paintings
- Anthony Cronin A Question Of Modernity
- Lucian Freud Two Paintings
- C. H. Sisson Christopher Homm's Sunday Dinner
- Noel Stock The Serious Artist
- Patrick Swift (under the pseudonym James Mahon) The Painter in the Press
- O. V. de L. Milosz The Hymn of Understanding
- Anthony Cronin (under the pseudonym Martin Gerard) Molloy becomes Unnamable
- Robert Pinget Le jardin le recyclé
- George D. Painter A Reply to Mme Riefstahl-Nordlinger
- On the Margin

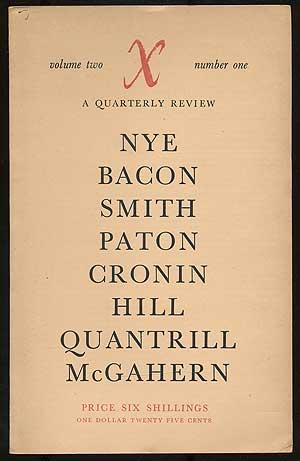
X, Vol. II, No. I, March 1961

Volume Two, Number One, March 1961

- A Foreword to Volume Two
- C. H. Sisson (under the pseudonym William Paton) The Profession of Letters or Down with Culture
- Claire McAllister Defence and Admonition
- Malcolm Quantrill Death of an Opportunity
- George Barker III Roman Odes
- Helen Lessore A Note on the Development of Francis Bacon's Painting
- Francis Bacon Seven Paintings
- C. H. Sisson Natural History
- Geoffrey Hill Two Sonnets
- John McGahern The End or the Beginning of Love
- Dannie Abse The Magician
- H.A. Gomperts Hunting to Live: II
- Robert Nye Perseus in Philistia
- Miranda Rothschild Two Poems
- Geoffrey Hazard The Last Quarter Brings the Cold
- Anthony Cronin Getting Wurred In
- Stevie Smith Three Poems
- Vernon Watkins Poem for Conrad
- A letter from Robert Hardy
- On the Margin

Paintings by Francis Bacon.

Volume Two, Number Two, August 1961

- Malcolm Lowry Four Poems (Be Patient for the Wolf; Hebephrene's Steep; Delirium in Vera Cruz; Reading Dom Quixote)
- Art and Morality:
  - Introduction (Prefatory Note by Malcolm Lowry)
  - George Barker The Hyppogryph and the Water-Pistol
  - Patrick Swift (under the pseudonym James Mahon) Mob Morals and the Art of Loving Art
  - Anthony Cronin (under the pseudonym Martin Gerard) It Means What It Says
  - C. H. Sisson Leisure and the Arts
  - Patrick Kavanagh On a Liberal Education
- John Heath-Stubbs Use of Personal Pronouns: A Lesson in English Grammar
- Brian Higgins Four Poems
- Phillip Martin Affiche; Four Paintings
- Georges Duthuit Can the Image be Abolished?
- Brian Higgins Sit Thi Dahn Pat Cuddy
- Noel Stock Danger: Biographers at Work
- Timothy Behrens Two Paintings
- David Wright A Vision
- James Lovell Alive, Alive O!
- Ghika A Pine Tree; The Innermost Flesh of Vital Space
- Anthony Cronin Two Poems ('Fairway's' Betting Office, Dublin, 1949; Responsibilities)
- J.C. Ashby Two Poems
- On the Margin

Volume Two, Number Three, July 1962

- Martin Seymour-Smith Six Poems; C.H. Sisson
- An Editorial
- George Barker On a Distant Prospect of English Poetry & Downing College
- William Clarke Four Poems
- Patrick Swift Seven Portraits
- C. H. Sisson Ten Poems
- Brian Higgins Six Poems
- Martin Green Coming up for Air
- John Heath-Stubbs Tantum Religio...
- John Fairfax The City
- Christopher Humble Two Poems
- J.C. Ashby Three Poems
- Dom Moraes Myth One
- Howard Griffin Delphi
- Patrick Kavanagh The Cattle Fair
- Thomas Blackburn Two Poems
- Aidan Higgins Langrishe, Go Down
- Patrick Kavanagh Mermaid Tavern
- Nathaniel Tarn Remembering Benares
- David Wright Reflections on Love
- Walter McElroy The Hunchback, From Tristan Corbière
- Hugh MacDiarmid From 'The Snares of Varuna'
- On the Margin

== An anthology from X ==
Selected by David Wright (Oxford University Press, 1988)

Articles and writings: Frank Auerbach (Fragments from a Conversation [with Patrick Swift]), Samuel Beckett (L'Image), Alberto Giacometti (The Dream, the Sphinx and the Death of T.), André Masson (Dissonances), Michael Andrews (Notes and Preoccupations), Robert Graves (November 5 Address), George Barker (Circular from America; How to Refuse a Heavenly House), Craigie Atchison (Fragments from a Conversation [with Patrick Swift]), Anthony Cronin (The Notion of Commitment; Goodbye to All That; A Question of Modernity; Getting Wurred In; It Means What It Says), David Bomberg (The Bomberg Papers [Posthumously: Swift unearthed and edited Bomberg's posthumous papers]), Hugh MacDiarmid (Reflections in a Slum), David Gascoyne (Remembering the Dead), Patrick Kavanagh (The Flying Moment; The Cattle Fair), C. H. Sisson (The Professor of Letters; Natural History), John McGahern (The End of the Beginning of Love), Martin Seymour-Smith (C.H. Sisson), Martin Green (Coming Up for Air), Hugh MacDiarmid (In Memoriam James Joyce). Art and Morality: Prefatory Note; George Barker (The Hippogryph and the Water-Pistol); Patrick Swift (Mob Morals and the Art of Loving Art); Anthony Cronin (It means What it Says); C.H.Sisson (Leisure and the Arts); Patrick Kavanagh (On a Liberal Education). Poets on Poetry: Hugh MacDiarmid, Vernon Watkins, Patrick Kavanagh, Stevie Smith.

Poems by Stevie Smith, Patrick Kavanagh, Brian Higgins, David Wright, Ezra Pound, C. H. Sisson, George Barker, Geoffrey Hill, Dannie Abse, Vernon Watkins, Malcolm Lowry, John Heath-Stubbs, Anthony Cronin, Cliff Ashby, Martin Seymour-Smith, William Clarke and Thomas Blackburn.

List of Illustrations: Patrick Swift (Portraits of George Barker, C.H.Sisson, David Wright and Patrick Kavanagh), David Bomberg (Self-portrait), Michael Andrews (The Gardener), Frank Auerbach (Head of E.O.W), Craigie Atchison (Tree and Wall Landscape).Drawings: Alberto Giacometti (Head; plans for 'The Dream, the Sphinx and the Death of T.'), André Masson (Illustrations for 'Dissonances')

== Quotes about ==
- David Wright's and Patrick Swift's legendary X set the common agenda for a generation of European painters, writers and dramatists.
  - Michael Schmidt, The Guardian, 2006
- A remarkable publication which, in some respects, was light years ahead of its time.
  - Brian Fallon (chief arts critic to The Irish Times for 35 years)
- Brilliant but short-lived.
  - Cambridge paperback guide to Literature in English
- X is a magazine dedicated to genius, passion and intelligence. It has the ease and authority of all excellent creations.
  - Time and Tide
- X is beautifully designed and well printed; in fact it has finally established a standard of production which other and future literary periodicals will have to live up to.
  - Paul Potts, Literary feast, Tribune, 1960
- One can't say that X is an unknown quantity any more... It's the Counter-Revolution.
  - New Statesman, 1960
- It certainly fills a need, for none of our established magazines can be described as a workshop for new talent... The art articles are outstanding—the young or less-known painters benefit from the handsome format and from the excellence of their own prose styles; some intelligent editing is going on here... X is performing a real service... Individualism, an interest in the soul, a respect for our revolutionary past, indifference to the topical label, a love of good painting and something rather painstaking which is not afraid of dullness, characterises this new quarterly.
  - Cyril Connolly, The Sunday Times
- We were out to provide a platform for the individual vision, not accepted avant-gardisme or second-hand attitudes.
  - David Wright in Poetry Nation
- The purpose behind the whole operation was to nurture the 'anarchic volatile centre' of creativity in the arts and to promote 'the unknown and the neglected or the known but unhonoured'.
  - CJ Fox (Canadian journalist and critic)

== Bibliography and further reading ==
- An Anthology from X, selected by David Wright (Oxford University Press, 1988) ISBN 0-19-212266-5
- X, Volume 1, Numbers 1–4, November 1959 – October 1960 (Barrie & Rockliff 1961). Limited to 800 copies. Hardcover.
- Lilly Library, Indiana University Bloomington: X magazine files
- The British Library: full collection of X, Volume One & Volume Two (search under: 'X. A Quarterly Review etc.')
- David Wright Obituary - The Independent
- David Wright - Poetry Nation
- The Chameleon Poet: A Life of George Barker, Robert Fraser (Jonathan Cape, 2001)
- Young John McGahern: Becoming a Novelist, Denis Sampson (Oxford University Press 2012) ISBN 978-0-19-964177-2
- Frank Auerbach, Robert Hughes, Thames and Hudson (1990;92)
- The Collected Poems of Elizabeth Smart, David Gascoyne (ed.) (Paladin, London, 1992)
- By Heart, Elizabeth Smart - A Life, Rosemary Sullivan, p. 274, (Flamingo, London, 1992)
- Fourteen Letters (to David Wright), C.H. Sisson, PN Review 39, Vol. 11, No. 1, July–August 1984
- RTÉ Radio. John McGahern and Patrick Swift by Denis Sampson. Recorded Sunday, 29 March 2009. Go to minute 46:54
- Crawford Municipal Art Gallery, Cork, Patrick Swift exhibition
- Patrick Swift on David Wright, PN Review 14, Volume 6 Number 6, July–August 1980.
- Patrick Swift 1927–83 (ISBN 0-946641-37-4), Gandon Editions, 1993; with contributions on Swift by George Barker, Anthony Cronin, Patrick Kavanagh, John McGahern, Brian Higgins, C. H. Sisson, Katherine Swift, David Wright and Martin Green (author).
- CH Sisson on THE STAMP OF LIFE by Anthony Cronin, Collected Poems 1950–1973, PN Review 11, Volume 6 Number 3, January–February 1980.
- Cliff Ashby, PN Review 14, Volume 6 Number 6, July–August 1980.
- Dead as Doornails, Anthony Cronin (Dublin, Dolmen Press, 1976)
- Quotes about X magazine
- Swift in X magazine
- John McGahern Interview Jsse: "I wrote a first novel with a pretentious title, The End or Beginning of Love... They liked it and published an extract. That was my first time in print. The magazine was influential, though, like most magazines of the kind, it was short lived... The extract in X attracted interest from a number of publishers. Fabers, among other publishers, wrote to me. T. S. Eliot was working at the firm then."
- Isola di Rifiuti
- Patrick Kavanagh: A Biography, Antoinette Quinn (author), Gill & Macmillan Ltd; 2nd Revised edition (Sep 2003)
- Love Of The World, John McGahern, Essays, Edited by Stanley van der Ziel (Faber and Faber 2009); "The Bird Swift" by McGahern
- On the Look-out, CH Sisson (Carcanet Press, Manchester, 1989)
- On the side of the angels, Elizabeth Smart, edited by Alice van Wart (Harper-Collins, London, 1994)
- "Literary feast", X, a Quarterly Review, Paul Potts, Tribune, 29 July 1960
- "Magazines and the cold war", Philip Toynbee, The Observer, 3 December 1961
- "More art than letters", Malcolm Bradbury, The Guardian, 19 December 1961
- "Out of the soho jungle", Anthony Thwaite, The Observer, 4 September 1988
- "Poésie sans frontières", Michael Schmidt, The Guardian, Saturday 15 July 2006
- Lucian Freud - Youth: 1922–1968, William Feaver, Bloomsbury, 2019, pp. 509–511
