= The Faber Book of Twentieth Century Verse =

1953 poetry anthology

First edition

The Faber Book of Twentieth Century Verse: An Anthology of Verse in Britain 1900-1950 was a poetry anthology edited by John Heath-Stubbs and David Wright, and first published in 1953 by Faber and Faber. A selection in self-conscious contrast to the Faber Book of Modern Verse, it did not attempt to cover American poetry (beyond Eliot and Pound). It has been through numerous further editions. It was last issued as a hardback in St. Clair Shores, Michigan by Somerset Publishers Inc. in 1988 with ISBN 0-403-07212-3.

== Poets in The Faber Book of Twentieth Century Verse ==
L. Aaronson - Lascelles Abercrombie - Dannie Abse - Drummond Allison - W. H. Auden - George Barker - William Bell - John Betjeman - Laurence Binyon - Thomas Blackburn - Edmund Blunden - Wilfrid Scawen Blunt - Robert Bridges - Rupert Brooke - Norman Cameron - Roy Campbell - Maurice Carpenter - Charles Causley - G. K. Chesterton - Alex Comfort - A. E. Coppard - John Davidson - Idris Davies - W. H. Davies - Walter de la Mare - C. M. Doughty - Keith Douglas - Lawrence Durrell - T. S. Eliot - William Empson - James Elroy Flecker - David Gascoyne - Wilfrid Gibson - W. S. Graham - Robert Graves - Thomas Hardy - H. D. - Thomas Hennell - Rayner Heppenstall - Ralph Hodgson - A. E. Housman - James Joyce - Patrick Kavanagh - Sidney Keyes - Rudyard Kipling - James Kirkup - D. H. Lawrence - Laurie Lee - Alun Lewis - C. Day Lewis - Hugh MacDiarmid - Patrick MacDonogh - Louis MacNeice - John Masefield - Harold Monro - T. Sturge Moore - Edwin Muir - Henry Newbolt - Robert Nichols - Norman Nicholson - Wilfred Owen - Herbert Palmer - Ruth Pitter - William Plomer - Paul Potts - Ezra Pound - F. T. Prince - Kathleen Raine - Herbert Read - Edgell Rickword - Anne Ridler - W. R. Rodgers - Isaac Rosenberg - Siegfried Sassoon - John Short - Edith Sitwell - Stevie Smith - Sydney Goodsir Smith - Stephen Spender - J. C. Squire - Arthur Symons - Dylan Thomas - Edward Thomas - W. J. Turner - Dorothy Wellesley - Vernon Watkins - Anna Wickham - Charles Williams - W. B. Yeats - Andrew Young

== See also ==
- 1953 in poetry
- 1953 in literature
- English poetry
- List of poetry anthologies
