= Nimbus (literary magazine) =

vol. III, No. 4, Winter 1956. Contributors to this issue include Patrick Swift & Patrick Kavanagh

Nimbus, "A Magazine of Literature, the Arts, and New Ideas", was a literary magazine co-founded in London in 1951 by Martin Green and Tristram Hull.

== History ==
Nimbus, a British "little magazine" of the 1950s, was founded in 1951. The magazine represents part of a rich history of literary magazines that reflect not only the literary, but also the social and political history of England. Nimbus continued as well a tradition of modernism cultivated since the First World War, especially by writers of the Bloomsbury Group and the Auden generation. Nimbus was among such important little magazines as Encounter, London Magazine, and Poetry edited by such distinguished writers as T. S. Eliot, John Lehmann and Stephen Spender, who helped set a tone of excellence in the publication of little magazines and were instrumental in changing the mood and direction of modern British literature.

Nimbus: A Magazine of Literature, the Arts, and New Ideas began publication in December 1951 as a quarterly magazine of new writing. Tristram Hull, son of R. F. C. Hull, poet and translator of the Collected Works of C.G. Jung, acted as editor for the magazine's four volumes of thirteen issues. Hull was later joined by co-editors Ivo Jarosy, 1953–1954, and David Wright, 1955–1957 and Martin Green (author, 1951–1957) when the magazine was published from Martin's flat: 20 Shipley House, SW8 (Nimbus Issue No.1 Dec 1951) During this period Wright & Green published 19 poems by Patrick Kavanagh, sent to Wright by Patrick Swift, which proved to be the turning point in Kavanagh's career. Due to editorial differences between Wright and Hull, Christopher Logue, in 1957, became co-editor with Hull and the name of the magazine was changed to Nimbus: New English Review.

The magazine, published by John Trafford at the Halcyon Press, grew in size, stature and reputation from a fifteen-page experiment into a sixty-page provocative venue for new British, Commonwealth and Continental writing. Nimbus editors rejected strict identification with any one contemporary British literary school, yet often found themselves involved in their debates and controversies. Nimbus attempted to distance itself from such recognized "Movement" poets as Kingsley Amis. The Movement poets were themselves reacting against the earlier romantic "New Apocalypse" writers such as George Barker, Anthony Thwaite, G. S. Fraser and Henry Treece. The Movement writers were, in turn, considered by the "Maverick" poets to be conservative, formalist and neoclassical.

Nimbus was started as a quarterly magazine. Later it was published irregularly and ceased publication after 13 issues in 1958.

== Contributors ==
Nimbus published a diverse group of writers that included Dannie Abse, W. H. Auden, George Barker, Jean Cocteau, Mircea Eliade, T. S. Eliot, Jean Genet, Michael Hastings, Anthony Thwaite, John Heath-Stubbs, C. G. Jung, Patrick Kavanagh, Patrick Swift, Vernon Scannell, Laurie Lee, Bertolt Brecht, George MacBeth, Colin MacInnes, Pablo Neruda, Stevie Smith, Alexander Trocchi, Richard Wilbur and David Wright.
