= Brian Higgins (poet) =

Irish poet, mathematician & rugby league footballer

Brian Higgins, by Patrick Swift, c.1960

Brian Higgins (1930 –1965) was an Irish poet, mathematician and professional rugby league footballer.

‘Born at Batley in 1930, bored at Bradford in 1940, in 1950 he had an affair with the gamma function. He was educated in 1960 at the "York Minster", Soho.’

Thus states the biographical note on the endpaper of Brian Higgins's first book of poems, "The Only Need". Brian Higgins died in 1965, before his third book of poems "The Northern Fiddler" appeared. In an introduction to this book the poet George Barker wrote that Higgins "had perceived that the secret at the heart of affairs constituted the most ingenious practical joke, which only a man who was at one and the same time a mathematician and a poet of sentiment could start functioning for the amusement and edification of all concerned." Higgins called himself "a realist who wished to be romantic".

== Biography ==
Welfare X = Y

I am a digit soon to be cancelled out.
What does it matter, an integer, more or less?
For allowance is made in the rules that the world is a mess,
Plus or minus a few perhaps, but it's right—just about.

A knife in my guts is the line of a pen through my mark
And all my biography told in the numbers to ten
The cock of my eye to the sun and the laugh of my soul to the dark,
For I am one of the faceless signs, one of the Welfare Men.

The decimals stutter and this is the lie they repeat.
“The years that he lived are accountable for in the main
Add him up on the left and the right and it balances neat
A few blank months—but we soon got him working again”.

Yes, ordinate and abscissa, they chose for the graph
The amount of Time spent related to What is Produced
And a line through incorellate points is my strange epitaph
“With the usual allowance for error X equals Y is educed.”

— From The Only Need, 1960

He was born in Batley, Yorkshire, and educated at the University of Hull. He was a gifted mathematician and, briefly, a professional rugby league footballer. He then became a schoolteacher; but soon abandoned this for a literary career, at which he was also unsuccessful. After living from hand to mouth for some years, he died of a rare heart disease. As a poet he first came to attention through X (magazine) and it was one of X's editors, Patrick Swift, who first put him up - or as David Wright says, 'put up with him' - in London. Wright amusingly goes on to recall: "More than once Swift and I had to sit on his head to stop him writing furious letters full of impossible pecuniary demands to whichever was the unfortunate publisher of the moment. Higgins would say, with impenetrable logic: 'Look, it's going to cost them £500 to publish these rubbishy poems. Why don't they give me the £500 and not publish?' "

Martin Seymour-Smith says that "his best poems were full of urgency ... primitive energy and directness of purpose", and that "in some twenty poems, including ‘Snow and Poetry’ and ‘A Slight Unease’, he achieved a surprisingly precise, elegant and metaphysical voice that might well have been developed had he lived."

And David Wright on Higgins in Poetry Review: "Martin Seymour-Smith remarks in his Guide to Modern World Literature, ‘a hit-or-miss poet . . . who had too little time to exercise control over his considerable intelligence’. But one or two of his poems sustain a comparison with Blake, that else might seem fatuous, made by a reviewer of his last and posthumous book in the New Statesman (which of course never published a line by Higgins while he was alive; despite or because of the abusive letters Higgins used to hurl at its editor)...Useless to speculate what he might have done or been; but with his going there closed a window which would have let fresh air into the hothouse. Some of us might have felt the draught."

== Work ==
- The Only Need, Abelard-Schuman, London (1960)
- Notes While Travelling, London: Longmans, (1964)
- The Northern Fiddler, London: Methuen & Co. Ltd (1966)

== Reference and further reading ==
- X (magazine): X a Quarterly Review. Volume 2 Number 2, Barrie & Rockliff, London (1961)
- Essays. 1st UK in dj., BARKER, George, MacGibbon & Kee, London, 1970,
- Indian Uni
- Anthony Cronin
- Poem for Patrick Swift, by Higgins: Patrick Swift 1927-83 (Gandon Editions, Kinsale, 1993)
- Poetry Foundation
- Poetry Magazines, David Wright, Another Part of the Wood
- Irish Writers
- Poetry Mag
- Oxford Journals
