= Martin Green (author) =

Martin Green (10 July 1932 – 4 February 2015) was an English-born writer, editor and publisher.

== Background ==
Born in Stockport, Cheshire, England, Green was schooled at A. S. Neill's Summerhill, while his parents fought in the International Brigades during the Spanish Civil War. Green co-founded the literary periodical Nimbus (1951–58) with Tristram Hull and later worked as an editor at MacGibbon & Kee, where he published, alongside Timothy O'Keeffe, books including Nell Dunn's Up the Junction (1963). They went on to form their own publishing house, Martin Brian & O'Keeffe, with the editor Brian Rooney. Here, Green collected and published Patrick Kavanagh, following the suggestion of the painter Patrick Swift and the poet Anthony Cronin. Green also published books by Flann O'Brien, Hugh MacDiarmid, Francis Stuart, Colin MacInnes, Robert Graves, Frank Sargeson, Paul Potts and many other writers.

While living in London with his wife, the artist Fiona Green, Thabo Mbeki and the (then banned) African National Congress held their meetings in their house in Fitzrovia. In 1969, with poet Paul Durcan, Green started the poetry quarterly Two Rivers, which was published from his home at 28 Tottenham Street, London. The title referred to the River Thames of London and the Liffey of Durcan's Dublin, Ireland.

Green published eight books of his own, as well as four plays, and contributions to numerous other publications including The Other Jerome K. Jerome (1984) and Myles Away from Dublin (1985). He had six children and eight grandchildren and lived in Newlyn, Cornwall, with his cat Nefertiti.

Green died on 4 February 2015 in St Austell, Cornwall, at the age of 82.
