= C. H. Sisson =

English writer (1914–2003)

- C. H. Sisson, by Patrick Swift, c. 1960
- Born: 22 April 1914; Bristol, England
- Died: 5 September 2003 (aged 89)
- Education: University of Bristol
- Occupations: Poet; writer; translator

Charles Hubert Sisson, CH (22 April 1914 – 5 September 2003), usually cited as C. H. Sisson, was an English poet, novelist, essayist, and translator.

== Life ==
Charles Hubert Sisson was born on 22 April 1914 in Bristol, England. His parents were Richard Percy Sisson and Ellen Minnie Sisson (née Worlock). He was a great friend of the critic and writer Donald Davie, with whom he corresponded regularly. He was educated at the University of Bristol where he read English and Philosophy. He continued his studies in France and Germany.

As a poet, he first came to light through the London Arts Review, X, founded by the painter Patrick Swift and the poet David Wright. He reacted against the prevailing intellectual climate of the 1930s, particularly the Auden Group, preferring to go back to the anti-Romantic T. E. Hulme, and to the Anglican tradition. The modernism of his poetry follows a 'distinct genealogy' from Hulme to Eliot, Pound, Ford Madox Ford and Wyndham Lewis. His novel Christopher Homm experiments with form and is told backwards.

Sisson entered the Ministry of Labour as Principal Assistant in 1936. During the Second World War, he served in the ranks of the British Army in India from 1942 to 1945. He was Simon Senior Research Fellow (1956–57), Director of Establishments, Ministry of Labour (1962–68), and Director of Occupational Safety and Health, Ministry of Employment (1972). 1972 was also the year of his retirement from the Civil Service, with the rank of Under-Secretary. A standard text, The Spirit of British Administration (1959), was the product of his Simon Senior Research Fellowship; it contains the main fruit of his reflection on the British Civil Service. The work notably compares British with French, (then West) German, Swedish, Austrian, and Spanish administrative methods; Sisson sees the British Civil Service as emerging favourably from the comparison. Only slight and negative mention is made of the United States. Sisson was no blind admirer of British methods, however. He was a 'severe critic of the British Civil Service and some of his essays caused controversy'. In his collection The London Zoo, he writes this epitaph: 'Here lies a civil servant. He was civil/ To everyone, and servant to the devil.'

Sisson was married, in 1937, to Nora Gilbertson (d. 2003) and they had two daughters. In 1993, C. H. Sisson was appointed a Member of the Order of the Companions of Honour for his services to literature.

Sisson died on 5 September 2003.

== Works ==
=== Poetry collections ===
- Poems (1959)
- The Spirit of British Administration (1959)
- The London Zoo (1961)
- Numbers (Methuen, 1965)
- The Discarnation, or How the Flesh became Word and Dwelt Among Us (1967)
- Metamorphoses, (Methuen, London, 1968)
- Roman Poems (1968)
- In the Trojan Ditch: Collected Poems and Selected Translations (Carcanet Press, 1974)
- The Corridor (Mandeville Press, Hitchin, 1975) (ISBN 0-904533-12-3)
- Anchises (1976) (ISBN 0-85635-178-4)
- Moon-Rise and Other Poems (1979)
- Exactions (1980), (ISBN 0-85635-332-9)
- Autobiographical and other papers of Philip Mairet (1981), editor
- Modern Poets Five (Faber and Faber, 1981) editor Jim Hunter, with Andrew Waterman, Craig Raine, Robert Wells, and Andrew Motion
- Night Thoughts and Other Poems (1983)
- Collected Poems 1943–1983 (Carcanet Press, 1984) (ISBN 0-85635-498-8)
- God Bless Karl Marx! (Carcanet Press, 1987) (ISBN 0-85635-710-3)
- On the Lookout: A Partial Autobiography (Carcanet Press, 1989)
- Selected Poems (Carcanet Press, Paperback 1990)
- Nine Sonnets (1991)
- Re-active Anthology: Ghosts in the Corridor No. 2 (1992) with Andrew Crozier and Donald Davie
- The Pattern (Enitharmon Press, 1993) (ISBN 1-870612-68-X)
- What and Who (Carcanet Press, 1994)
- Poems: Selected (Carcanet Press, 1995)
- Collected Poems (Carcanet Press, 1998)
- Antidotes (Carcanet Press, 2001)

=== Novels ===
- An Asiatic Romance. A satirical novel (Gaberbocchus Press) 1953
- Christopher Homm (Methuen Publishing, 1965)

=== Critical works (books) ===
- Art and Action (Methuen, 1965)—literary theory, criticism
- Case of Walter Bagehot (Faber and Faber, 1972) (ISBN 0-571-09501-1)
- David Hume (1976)
- Jonathan Swift: Selected Poems (1977) ed. C.H. Sisson, Carcanet Press, 1990 (ISBN 0-85635-135-0)
- Jude the Obscure by Thomas Hardy (1978) ed. C.H. Sisson, Penguin English Library (ISBN 978-0-14-043131-5)
- The Avoidance of Literature: Collected Essays (Carcanet Press, 1979) (ISBN 0-85635-229-2)
- PN Review 16 , Sisson, C H (ed) I A Richards, PN Review, Publication Date: 1980
- Collected Poems and Plays, Lewis, Wyndham; Munton, Alan (ed.); C.H. Sisson (intro.), (Carcanet Press, 1981)
- English Poetry, 1900–50, ed. C.H. Sisson (Carcanet Press, 1982)
- The Rash ACT, Ford, Ford Madox, ed. C.H. Sisson (Carcanet Press, 1982. Paperback 1996) (ISBN 0-85635-399-X)
- The English Sermon (Carcanet Press, 1982)
- Anglican Essays (1983)
- The English Novel Ford Madox Ford, ed. C.H. Sisson (Carcanet Press,1983)
- A Call Ford Madox Ford, ed. C.H. Sisson (Carcanet Press, 1984)
- The Regrets, Joachim Du Bellay; Translator – C.H. Sisson, (Carcanet Press, 1984)(ISBN 0-85635-471-6)
- Christina Rossetti (1830–1894) : Selected Poems , Rossetti, Christina Georgina; Sisson, C. H. (editor), (Carcanet Press, 1985) (ISBN 0-85635-533-X)
- Ladies Whose Bright Eyes, Ford Madox Ford, ed. C.H. Sisson (Carcanet Press, 1988)
- In Two Minds: Guesses at Other Writers (Carcanet Press, 1990)(ISBN 0-85635-877-0)
- Selected Writings Jeremy Taylor, ed. C.H. Sisson (Carcanet Press, 1990)
- English Perspectives: Essays on Liberty and Government (Carcanet Press, 1992)
- Grand Street 45 , Cage; John; Gates, David; Duong Thu Huong; Richter, Gerhard; Sisson, C H (W W Norton, New York, 1993) (ISBN 0-393-30992-4)
- Is There a Church of England? (Carcanet Press, 1993)
- Poems and Essays on Poetry, Edgar Allan Poe, ed. C.H. Sisson. (Carcanet Press, 1995)

=== Translations ===
- Versions and Perversions of Heine (1955)
- The Poetry of Catullus, The Viking Press, New York, 1966
- The Poetry of Catullus, MacGibbon and Kee, 1966
- Lucretius: De Rerum Natura (The Poem on Nature), Carcanet, Manchester, 1976
- The Poetic Art, Horace (Carcanet Press, 1978)
- Some Tales of La Fontaine, (Carcanet Press, 1979)
- The Divine Comedy (Carcanet Press, 1980)
- Song of Roland (Carcanet Press, 1983)
- The Aeneid (Carcanet Press, 1986)
- Collected Translations (Carcanet Press, 1996)
- Britannicus, Phaedra, Athaliah by Jean Racine (1987; Oxford Paperbacks, 2001) (ISBN 0-19-283827-X)

== Letters ==
- Letters to an Editor, ed. M. Fisher, Manchester : Carcanet, 1989, prints sixty-three letters from Sisson to the Carcanet Press. In the same volume Robert Hass (Letter 145, pp. 126–28) assesses Sisson’s political thought.
