= Craigie Aitchison (painter) =

Scottish painter (1926-2009)

- Aitchison in April 1989.
- Born: 13 January 1926; Edinburgh, Scotland
- Died: 21 December 2009 (aged 83)
- Occupation: Painter
- Father: Craigie Aitchison

John Ronald Craigie Aitchison CBE RSA RA (13 January 1926 – 21 December 2009) was a Scottish painter. He was best known for his many paintings of the Crucifixion, one of which hangs behind the altar in the chapter house of Liverpool Cathedral, Italian landscapes, and portraits (mainly of black men, or of dogs). His simple style with bright, childlike colours defied description, and was compared to the Scottish Colourists, primitivists or naive artists, although Brian Sewell dismissed him as "a painter of too considered trifles".

His career-long fascination with the crucifixion was triggered by a visit to see Salvador Dalí's Christ of St John of the Cross in 1951 after it was acquired by the Kelvingrove Gallery.

== Early life and education ==
Aitchison was born in Edinburgh, the son of the lawyer, politician and judge Craigie Mason Aitchison. His grandfather, Reverend James Aitchison, was minister at the United Free Church Erskine Kirk in Falkirk. Aitchison was educated at Loretto School, Musselburgh, East Lothian until the death of his father in 1941 and then at home by private tutors. His mother, Lady Aitchison, played international hockey. Her family owned Tulliallan, an estate in Fife, where Aitchison did some of his first landscape painting.

In the Second World War, Aitchison was rejected for military service on medical grounds. He studied law at Edinburgh University from 1944 to 1946, and at the Middle Temple in London in 1948, before changing career. He returned to Edinburgh in 1950 to practise painting in a converted mews house in Church Lane, and then studied at the Slade School of Fine Art in London from 1952 to 1954 under William Coldstream and Robert Medley. Aitchison won a prize for the best still life during his second year. Fellow students included Michael Andrews, Tony Pacitti, Philip Sutton, Victor Willing, Paula Rego, Myles Murphy and Euan Uglow. Aitchison remained friends with Uglow, and was best man at his wedding.

Aitchison was awarded a British Council scholarship in 1955 to study in Italy. He toured the country, and was influenced by early Italian painting, particularly Piero della Francesca. He returned to Scotland, but moved to Kennington in London in 1963.

== Career ==
=== Early work ===
Aitchison was one of "Six Young Contemporaries" at an exhibition at the Gimpel Fils gallery in 1954. His first solo exhibition was held at the Beaux Arts Gallery in London in 1959, and he held further solo exhibitions throughout the United Kingdom. He exhibited at Marlborough Fine Art in London in 1968. He was a part-time teacher at the Chelsea School of Art from 1968 to 1984.

His paintings were included in many group shows around the world from 1964, and in three retrospective exhibitions.

=== Mature work ===
Aitchison became an Associate of the Royal Academy in 1978, and was elected as one of the 80 Members of the Royal Academy (or Royal Academicians) in 1988. He resigned from the Academy in 1997 in protest over the display of Marcus Harvey's work Myra, but rejoined in 1998.

In 1996 he was commissioned to paint a mural of Calvary – a landscape illuminated by a mystical light – for the Gothic Revivalist Truro Cathedral in Cornwall. In 1997, he was commissioned to paint Calvary for Liverpool Cathedral, and he created a design for a Christmas stamp for the Royal Mail in 1999. Further sacred works by Aitchison are held the chapel of King's College, Cambridge.

Retrospectives of his work were held at the Serpentine Gallery in 1981, at Harewood House near Leeds in 1994, and at the Gallery of Modern Art in Glasgow in 1996. Other shows were held at the Museum of Modern Art, Powys in 2001 and at the Royal Academy in London in 2003. He won the Royal Academy's Korn Ferry International Award in 1989 and in 1991, won the first £30,000 Jerwood Painting Prize, sponsored by The Sunday Telegraph in 1994, and won the Nordstern Art Prize in 2000. He was made a Commander of the Order of the British Empire (CBE) in 1999.

Several of his works are held in the collection of the Tate Gallery. He designed the Tate Gallery's Christmas tree and Christmas card in 1992. Birmingham Museums & Art Gallery and the National Galleries of Scotland also own works.

== Personal life ==
Aitchison lived and worked in London and in Italy. When in London, he lived in Kennington, where he occupied the same Victorian town house for 35 years. He bought Wayney, the first of his woolly Bedlington Terriers, from Crufts in 1971. He continued to own Bedlington Terriers over a 28-year period; in the later part of his life he owned three. They featured in a number of his paintings.

== Bibliography ==
- Craigie Aitchison: Out of the Ordinary, Andrew Lambirth, Royal Academy of Arts (2003)
- Craigie: The Art of Craigie Aitchison, Andrew Gibbon-Williams, Canongate Books Ltd. (2001)
- Craigie Aitchison paintings 1953–1981, Arts Council of Great Britain (1981)
- Craigie Aitchison Recent Work, Paul Levy, Waddington Galleries, Catalogue (27 Oct 2006)
- The First Miracle, Jeffrey Archer (author), Craigie Aitchison (illustrator), HarperCollins (1994)
- Craigie Aitchison: Prints: A Catalogue Raisonné, Andrew Lambirth, Royal Academy of Arts (1 Jun 2013))
- Craigie Atchison, Fragments from a Conversation [with Patrick Swift], X magazine, Vol. 1, No. 4 (October 1960); An Anthology from X, Oxford University Press (1988)
