= Cliff Ashby =

British poet and novelist

J. Clifford Ashby, generally known as Cliff Ashby, (10 November 1919 – 30 April 2012) was a British poet and novelist.

He was born in Norfolk in 1919, and left school aged 14, taking a job as a window dresser in Leeds.

He was a conscientious objector in the Second World War, undertaking agricultural work in lieu of military service. In so doing he met several artists and poets, and began the path to his own literary career.

As a poet he came to light through X magazine.

His poetry collections include In the Vulgar Tongue (1968), The Dogs of Dewsbury (1976), Lies and Dreams (1980), Plain Song: Collected Poems (1985) and A Few Late Flowers (2007). His novels are The Old Old Story and How and Why (both 1969).

He died at home on 30 April 2012.

On Ashby's Few Late Flowers (2008) Robert Nye says: "He has just published what must be the most remarkable swansong offered by a writer in their 89th year...A sequence of quietly original poems, it is the bittersweet distillation of a lifetime's experience"

== Bibliography ==
- Old, Old Story (ISBN 0340109408 / ISBN 0-340-10940-8), Hodder & Stoughton Ltd, 1969
- In the Vulgar Tongue (ISBN 0340026855 / ISBN 0-340-02685-5), Hodder and Stoughton, 1968
- Howe and Why, Hodder and Stoughton, 1970
- The Dogs of Dewsbury Poems, Carcanet Press
- Lies and Dreams Poems, Carcanet Press
- Plain Song: Collected Poems, Carcanet, 1985
- A Few Late Flowers, HappenStance Press, 2008
