= Nano Reid =

Irish painter (1900–1981)

- Born: Anne Margaret Reid; 1 March 1900; Drogheda, County Louth, United Kingdom of Great Britain and Ireland
- Died: 17 November 1981 (aged 81); Drogheda, County Louth Ireland
- Known for: Modern Art
- Notable work: Bathing in the Dodder, Loafers, Spell of the Wood, Legende

Nano Reid (1 March 1900 – 17 November 1981) was an Irish painter who specialised in landscape, figure painting and portraits.

One of the finest Irish painters of the century, her rich but subtly expressionist use of pigment makes her work as relevant today as when she started painting

== Early life and education ==
Nano Reid was born Anne Margaret Reid on 1 March 1900, in Drogheda, County Louth. She was the eldest of four children of Thomas Reid, publican, and Anne Reid (née Downey). The family home was above their pub in Drogheda, with the family also owning a number of properties in the town and in Dublin. Reid attended school at the Siena Convent, where in addition to being a talented pianist, her skills as a painter developed. Upon leaving school she initially enrolled to train as a nurse at the Mater Misericordiae University Hospital, but left after two months. Her parents were persuaded by their parish priest, Fr Segrave, to allow Nano Reid to attend the Metropolitan School of Art in Dublin. Whilst there she studied under Seán Keating, Harry Clarke, Patrick Tuohy and Leo Whelan. Nano Reid taught at her old school and a boys' school in Drogheda in 1923. She exhibited for the first time at the Royal Hibernian Academy (RHA) in 1925 with three illustrations of poems. Nano Reid exhibited with the RHA periodically until 1968, though never became an academic member.

In 1927, as was common with other Irish painters of the time, Nano Reid went to Paris. Whilst there, she attended to the Académie de la Grande Chaumière for a few months, but the experience doesn't appear to have had an influence on her painting style. She then went to London to attend the Chelsea Polytechnic from 1929 to 1930, which she did not enjoy and after that remained in Ireland.

== Artistic career ==
After returning to Ireland, Nano Reid began to exhibit landscape painting at the RHA. Like other painters of the period, such as Paul Henry, she travelled to the west of Ireland for painting inspiration with her early work showing the landscapes, local people and fisherman of the area. In 1934, she held a solo show at the Society of Dublin Painters at St Stephen's Green. Her second solo show was in 1936 at the Daniel Egan Gallery in Dublin, the show consisted of 53 watercolours and 23 oil paintings. At the request of the Mayor of Drogheda, the collection was rehung in the town.

Nano Reid's sister had taken over the family pub, to which she was a regular visitor while living primarily in Dublin. In Dublin she shared a house with her friend Patricia Hutchins. After WWII, Nano Reid moved to Fitzwilliam Square, sharing with others, including Pearse Hutchinson.

In 1950, Nano Reid and Norah McGuinness were selected to represent Ireland at the Venice Biennale of Art. This was the first time Irish artists participated in this international exhibition, which has been supported by the government of Ireland since then through a range of departments and agencies responsible for foreign affairs, arts and culture.

The Arts Council of Northern Ireland's Chichester Street Gallery, Belfast was the venue for a collection of forty solo works in the summer of 1964. She had previously shown in Belfast as a guest of the Ulster Society of Women Artists and with the Irish Exhibition of Living Art.

== Work in collections ==
- Crawford Art Gallery, Cork
- Highlanes Gallery, Drogheda
- Hugh Lane Gallery, Dublin
- Trinity College Dublin
- The Arts Council of Ireland including
  - Cave of the Firbola
  - Wreckage No.1
- Santa Barbara Museum California
- Irish Institute, New York
- University of Limerick, IACI O'Malley Collection (1) Donkeys on the Aran Shore, (2) Valley Desmond, Gaugan Barra

== Quotes ==
- A born artist and a born stylist...This young artist from Drogheda has to be saluted as a genius.
  - Thomas MacGreevy, The Irish Times, 27 November 1942, p. 3 link
- One can say, without pretension, that she has her place in European painting.
  - Patrick Swift, Envoy, March 1950 (read article). Reid painted Swift's portrait that year.
- For my money the best Irish painter, mo cheol thú, a Nano.
  - Pearse Hutchinson, The Irish Imagination 1959–1971 (1971)

== References and further reading ==
- Karen Reihill "Gerard Dillon, Art and Friendships" pdf http://www.adams.ie/cat-pdf/20713.pdf
- "Irish Art from Nathaniel Hone to Nano Reid: The Drogheda Municipal Art Collection in Context". Dr Denise Ferran. Highlanes Gallery (Drogheda). 2006
- Boylan, Henry (1998). A dictionary of Irish biography. Roberts Rinehart Pub. ISBN 978-1-57098-236-1.
- The Modern Art Collection: Trinity College Dublin. 1989. ISBN 978-1-871408-01-0.
- Arnold, Bruce (1995). Irish Art. ISBN 978-0-500-20148-0.
- Declan Mallon (1994), Nano Reid. Drogheda, Co. Louth: Sunnyside Publications.
- Patrick Swift, Envoy, A Review of Literature and Art, March 1950 read article
- Karen Reihill "Gerard Dillon, Art and Friendships" published by Adams Auctioneers ( www.adams.ie ) Summer Loan Exhibition 2013 http://www.adams.ie/cat-pdf/20713.pdf
