= Mary Hutchinson (writer) =

British writer (1889–1977)

Mary Barnes Hutchinson
- Born: Mary Barnes; 29 March 1889; Simla, Bengal, British India
- Died: 17 April 1977 (aged 88); London, England
- Known for: Short-story writer

Mary Barnes Hutchinson (29 March 1889 – 17 April 1977) was a British short-story writer, socialite, model and a member of the Bloomsbury Group.

== Early life ==
Hutchinson was born in Simla, Bengal, British India, to Sir Hugh Barnes and Winifred (Strachey) Barnes. After spending her early childhood in India, she was raised in Florence, Italy by her maternal grandparents, and later attended boarding school in England. Hutchinson moved to London in 1909 and in 1910 married barrister St John Hutchinson. Their marriage lasted until his death in 1942. They had two children, Jeremy Hutchinson, Baron Hutchinson of Lullington and Barbara Judith, who later married Victor Rothschild, 3rd Baron Rothschild.

== Bloomsbury Group ==
In 1910, her cousin Lytton Strachey and Duncan Grant introduced her to the Bloomsbury Group. Hutchinson eventually became a hostess and patroness, hosting lavish soirees at her two homes, Eleanor House and River House. In 1927, influenced by the Group's writers, Hutchinson published a single volume of thirteen articles and six short stories entitled Fugitive Pieces. Throughout her life, she attracted a group of writers and painters to her house, where she and her husband entertained, among others, Mark Gertler, Edward Kauffer, T. S. Eliot, Aldous Huxley, and Virginia Woolf. Hermione Lee asserts in her biography of Virginia Woolf that Hutchinson was the "main inspiration for the febrile socialite Jinny in The Waves."

== Art model ==
Hutchinson often posed as a model for painters. In 1915, Vanessa Bell painted an unflattering portrait of her called Mrs. St. John Hutchinson, describing it as "perfectly hideous... and yet quite recognizable."

Hutchinson also posed for two of Bell's paintings, Nude with Poppies (1916), which Bell painted for Hutchinson, and The Tub.

Hutchinson was also the subject of a 4th painting in 1920 where she is shown in an attractive pose. This would have been painted some six years into Hutchinson’s public affair with Clive Bell in sharp contrast with the 1915 “hideous” portrait. [Citation and illustration: VWSGB Bulletin No. 66, January 2021]

Clive Bell introduced her to Henri Matisse, who drew her portrait twice in 1936, both charcoal drawings entitled Portrait of Mary Hutchinson.

In the early 1930s, Russian artist Boris Anrep used her as a model for Erato, the muse of lyric poetry, in The Awakening of the Muses mosaic in the entrance hall of the National Gallery in London.

== Personal life ==
Although married until her husband's death in 1942, Hutchinson had many lovers, many of whom were part of, or in contact with, the Bloomsbury Group. She maintained a long term, indiscreet affair with Clive Bell from 1914 until 1927, who was married to fellow Bloomsbury Group member Vanessa Bell. On the other hand, her letters suggest that she maintained a similarly long term relationship from 1922 to 1930 with Aldous Huxley and his wife, Maria, although this was kept secret from the Bloomsbury Group and from Jack Hutchinson. Hutchinson also had brief liaisons with Vita Sackville-West and Matisse's son-in-law, Georges Duthuit, and had an affair with Virginia Woolf.

Hutchinson and T.S. Eliot maintained a close correspondence from 1916 until the last months of his life. She was also an early supporter of Samuel Beckett and corresponded with him throughout his career. Hutchinson was also interested in fashion and interior design, and remained an active patron of the arts throughout her life. She supported the publication of the literary and artistic magazine, X.

She died in London in 1977.
