= Elamkulam Kunjan Pillai =

Indian historian, linguist and academic

Elamkulam P. N. Kunjan Pillai
- A portrait of Elamkulam P. N. Kunjan Pillai
- Born: P. N. Kunjan Pillai; 8 November 1904; Elamkulam, Travancore
- Died: 4 March 1973 (aged 68); Trivandrum, Kerala
- Education: Annamalai University (Undergraduate Degree)
- Occupations: Historian; Academic

Elamkulam P. N. Kunjan Pillai (8 November 1904 – 4 March 1973), known as Elamkulam, was an Indian historian, linguist and academic from southern Kerala, India. He was a pioneering scholar of southern Indian history, particularly the history of Kerala. Although only holding academic degrees in Sanskrit and Malayalam, and having no formal training as a historian, Elamkulam is considered one of the pioneers of modern Kerala historiography.

He was one of the major proponents of the unitary/imperial state model in medieval Kerala history. The Elamkulam model of a highly centralised "empire" (unitary/Imperial state model) in medieval Kerala is now considered unacceptable by south Indian historians. The majority of Elamkulam's works are written in Malayalam, with a few in Tamil and English.

He was well versed in Kannada, Tulu and Pali (language of the Theravada Buddhist canon) also. He was also considered one of the top authorities in Vattezhuthu script and Old/Early Malayalam language.

Elamkulam associated himself for some time with Mortimer Wheeler in the excavation works at Harappa, Chandravally, and Brahmagiri. He also mentored M. G. S. Narayanan in the early 1970s, who was then a research scholar at the University of Kerala.

== Life and career ==
He was born in Elamkulam village in Travancore to Krishna Kurup and Purackal Nanukutty Amma on 8 November 1904. His family is from present-day Trivandrum and Kollam districts. Kunjan Pillai had his school education at Trivandrum and Quilon.

He graduated with an honours degree in the Sanskrit language from Annamalai University, Madras. His studies at Madras had a great influence on his life. His views on Kerala's history changed after he returned back from Tamil Nadu.

He started his career as a school teacher and later became lecturer in Malayalam at Government Arts College, Trivandrum. Elamkulam retired as the Head of the Department of Malayalam, University College, Trivandrum.

Elamkulam published most his research findings only in his later years. He published more than 20 books, in Malayalam, including one in Tamil and two in English. Some of his theories regarding early Kerala history have been challenged by later researchers in the light of new evidence.

Pillai died on 4 March 1973. Kanjiracode Valiaveettil Bhargavi Amma was his wife. The couple had five children.

== Unitary/Imperial state model ==
Elamkulam had studied comprehensively Old/Early Malayalam - Vatteluttu inscriptions from the ninth century CE, and with the help of literary texts, claimed they belonged to a single line of kings ("the Kulasekharas") that ruled Kerala from Kodungallur. He had challenged the very foundations of the then existing William Logan-K. P. Padmanabha Menon construction of Kerala history. He proposed a unitary or imperial state model, emphasising centralised administration, for the Kulasekhara kingdom.

The Elamkulam version of historiography had believed that this "Second Chera Empire", or "Kulasekhara Empire" was a highly centralised kingdom. However, critical research in the late 1960s and early 1970s by offered a major corrective to this. Recently (2002), suggestions pointing to the other extreme, that the king at Kodungallur had only a "ritual sovereignty" and the actual political power rested with "a bold and visible Brahmin oligarchy" has emerged.

The nature of the Kodungallur Chera/Kulasekhara state is an ongoing academic debate. While the Elamkulam model of a highly centralised "empire" is considered not acceptable by south Indian historians, the third model (2002) is yet to be endorsed by them.

== Selected works ==
=== In Malayalam ===
- Unnuneeli Sandesam
- Koka Sandesam
- Leelathlakam
- Chandrolsavam
- Unnuneeli Sandesam Charithradrishtiyilkoodi
- Nalachritham Attakkatha
- Gandhidevan
- Keralabhashayude Vikasaparinamangal
- Bhashayum Sahityavum Noottandukalil
- Sahityamalika
- 108 Shivalaya Sothram
- Sahityacharithrasamgraham
- Keralacharithrathile Iruldanja Edukal
- Annathe Keralam
- Chila Kerala Charithra Prasnangal (Part I, II, & III)
- Janmi samprdayam Keralathil
- Keralam Anchum Arum Noottandukalil
- Cherasamrajyam Ompathum Pathum Noottandukalil
- Samskarathinte Nazhikakkallukal

=== In English ===
- Studies in Kerala History
- Some Problems in Kerala History

=== In Tamil ===
- Pandai Keralam
