= György Károly =

Hungarian poet and writer

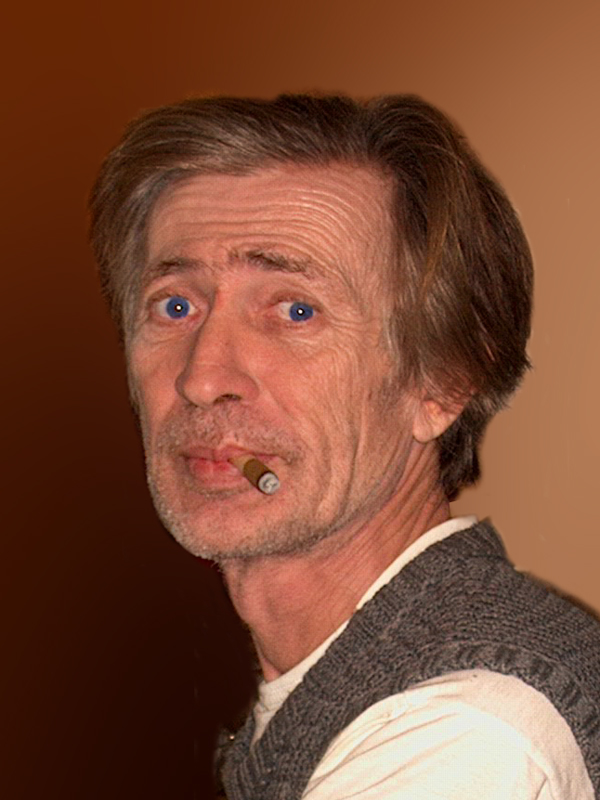
- György Károly poet and writer
- Born: 31 August 1953; Budapest, Hungary
- Died: 26 October 2018 (aged 65); Szigetszentmiklós, Hungary
- Spouse: Annamária Szklenkay
- Writing career
- Genre: Poetry

György Károly (Károly György, 31 August 1953 – 26 October 2018) was a Hungarian poet and writer.

== Biography ==
Károly was born in Budapest on 31 August 1953, the only son of György Károly (1924–2003), a butcher, and Ilona Szabó (1928–2014), a tailor. He spent his early life in Szigetszentmiklós, where he finished his primary school years. After he completed his studies in Budapest. Károly was educated as a geologist and began to write in the 1970s. He published his first poems in Élet és Irodalom (“Life and Literature”). He was poetic silent in the 1980s. In the nineties Károly began writing again.

== Bibliography ==
=== Books ===
- Károly György: Folyamatos május (poems, private edition, Budapest 1999)
- Károly György – Péter Péter: Dunakanyaró (poems, private edition, Vác 2005)

=== Anthologies ===
- Téli tárlat ’98 (Madách Imre Művelődési Központ, Vác 1998, 96 pages)
- Gondolattánc (Svájci-Magyar Kiadói Kft., Budapest 2000, 270 pages) ISBN 963-9032-96-4
- Szótól szóig (Alterra Svájci-Magyar Kiadó Kft., Budapest 2002, 340 pages) ISBN 963-9324-26-4
- A Dunakanyar költészete 2005 (Kucsák Könyvkötészet és Nyomda, Vác 2005, 199 pages) ISBN 963-218-048-8
- Ezer magyar haiku (Napkút Kiadó, Budapest 2010, 332 pages) ISBN 978-963-263-129-5

=== Literary journals ===
- A Céh
- Árgus
- Bárka
- Béta magazin (β)
- C.E.T – Central European Time
- Duna-part
- Élet és Irodalom
- Havi Magyar fórum
- Hírnök
- Holmi
- Igazunk
- Madách Rádió
- Magyar Élet (New Zealand)
- Magyar Demokrata
- Magyar Fórum
- Magyar Napló
- Magyar Világ
- Mozgó Világ
- Műhely
- Napút
- Pannon Tükör
- Parnasszus
- Petőfi Rádió
- Új Pest megyei Hírlap
- Somogy
- Törökfürdő
- Új Hagyomány
- Váci Napló
- Váci Polgár

== Personal life ==
Károly was married to Annamária Szklenkay (born 1958), with whom he had five children. They lived in Vác for twenty years, and in Pilis for three years before moving to Szigetszentmiklós. Károly died of a brain tumor on 26 October 2018.

== External links (Hungarian texts) ==
- Official website of György Károly
- Terebess Online

- Assorted poems on Wikisource
- Sonnetset on Wikisource (Crown of sonnets)
