= Patrick Deeley =

Irish poet (born 1953)

Patrick Deeley (born 1953) is an Irish poet.

== Life ==
Patrick Deeley was born in Mullagh, Loughrea, County Galway. His poems have been widely published and anthologised in Ireland and abroad over the past forty years, and translated to French, Italian, Spanish and other languages. He has received awards, including the inaugural Dermot Healy Poetry Prize and the 2019 Lawrence O'Shaughnessy Prize for Poetry. His works of fiction for younger readers include The Lost Orchard, winner of the Eilís Dillon Award in 2001. His bestselling memoir, The Hurley Maker's Son, was published by Doubleday Ireland/Transworld and shortlisted for the 2016 Irish Nonfiction Book of the Year Award. He formerly worked as a primary school principal in Dublin. In the 1980s, Deeley was on the council of Poetry Ireland.

== Bibliography ==
- Intimate Strangers (1986)
- Names for Love (1990)
- Turane: The Hidden Village (1995)
- Decoding Samara (2000)
- The Lost Orchard (2001)
- The Bones of Creation (2008).
- Territoire (2010)
- Groundswell: New and Selected Poems (2013)
- The Hurley Maker's Son(2015)
- The End of the World (2019)
- Keepsake (2024)

== Awards ==
- 2024 The poem 'Human' shortlisted for the Bridport Prize and the poem 'Keepsake' highly commended in the Forward Prize.
- 2020 Seventh collection of poems, The End of the World, shortlisted for The Farmgate Café National Poetry Award
- 2019 Winner of The Lawrence O’Shaughnessy Award for Poetry from the University of Saint Thomas, Saint Paul, Minnesota
- 2017 Prize-winner in both The Francis Ledwidge International Poetry Award and The Shirley McClure Poetry Competition
- 2016 Bestselling Memoir The Hurley Maker’s Son shortlisted for The Irish Non-Fiction Book of the Year Award.
- 2015 Winner of the WOW2! Poetry Award
- 2015 Featured in Notable Essays and Literary Nonfiction of 2015 selected by Robert Atwan
- 2014 Winner of The Dermot Healy International Poetry Prize
- 2012 Prize-winner Listowel Writers’ Week Single Poem Competition
- 2010 Prize-winner Gregory O Donoghue International Poetry Competition
- 2008 Prize-winner The Padraic Fallon Poetry Competition
- 2001 Winner of The Éilís Dillon Award and a Bisto Award for a First Children’s Book
- 1999 ‘Woodman’ chosen as one of Ireland’s 100 Favourite Poems in an Irish Times survey
- 1997 Atlanta Review International Merit Award
- 1988 Twelve poems presented on The Poet’s Eye, RTE TV
- 1981 Runner-up and Merit Award winner, The Patrick Kavanagh Competition
