= Patrick Swift =

Irish painter (1927–1983)

- Born: 12 August 1927; Dublin, Ireland
- Died: 19 July 1983 (aged 55); Algarve, Portugal
- Resting place: Igreja Matriz (Porches)
- Known for: Painting, ceramics, criticism, poetry, literature
- Website: https://painterpatrickswift.blogspot.com/

Patrick Swift (12 August 1927 – 19 July 1983) was an Irish painter who worked in Dublin, London and the Algarve, Portugal.

== Overview ==
In Dublin he formed part of the Envoy arts review / McDaid's pub circle of artistic and literary figures. In London he moved into the Soho bohemia where, with the poet David Wright, he founded and co-edited X magazine. In Portugal he continued painting while also writing and illustrating books on Portugal and founding Porches Pottery, which revived a dying industry. During his lifetime Swift had only two solo exhibitions. His first exhibition at the Waddington Gallery, Dublin, in 1952 was well acclaimed. For Swift, however, his art seems to have been a personal and private matter. In 1993 the Irish Museum of Modern Art held a retrospective of Swift's work.

== Work ==
He was a figurative painter. (Aidan Dunne: "He was a representational artist through and through...Fidelity to visual experience above all.") Though his style changed considerably over the years, his essential personality as an artist never did. He was plainly not interested in the formalist aspects of Modernism. He wanted art to have an expressive, emotive, even psychological content, though not in any literary sense. Anthony Cronin: "He was never in any doubt that painting was a re-creation of what the painter saw: in his own case at least not what the painter had seen or could imagine, but what he was actually looking at during the act of painting. A faithfulness of the sort was part of the bargain, part of his contract with his art… [which] had nothing to do with description…What was at stake was a faithful recreation of the truth to the artist of the experience, in the painter's case the visual experience, the artist being admittedly only one witness, one accomplice during and after the fact. Of course this faithfulness did not rule out expressionist overtones. The truth was doubtless subjective as well as objective. Swift's blues and greys were usually properties of what he was painting. They were also part of his vision of things, properties of his mind. We felt then that time could only find its full expression through an art that was frugal, ascetic, puritanical even."

Although he commented on art Swift never affiliated with any official or quasi-official art group or "style". He had three distinct "periods": Dublin, London, and Algarve. His work comprises portraits, "tree portraits" (trees held a special fascination for Swift), rural landscapes and urban landscapes. He worked in a variety of media including oils, watercolour, ink, charcoal, lithography and ceramics.

Swift regarded painting as "a deeply personal and private activity". (In 1952 The Irish Times noted that Swift's work was "intensely personal and strangely disturbing".)

== Biography ==
=== Dublin ===
He was educated at Synge Street CBS, a Christian Brothers School in Dublin. Although a self-taught artist he did attend night classes at the National College of Art in 1946 & 48 (under Seán Keating), freelanced in London in the late 1940s and attended the Grande Chaumière in Paris, where he met Giacometti, in the summer of 1950. In the late 1940s he had a studio on Baggot Street, and from 1950 to 1952 he set up his studio on Hatch Street. Lucian Freud would share Swift's studio when he visited Dublin. He first exhibited professionally in group shows at the Irish Exhibition of Living Art in 1950 & 51 where his work was singled out by critics. The Dublin Magazine commented on Swift's "uncompromising clarity of vision which eschews the accidental or the obvious or the sentimental" and "shows his power to convey the full impact of the object, as though the spectator were experiencing it for the first time." In 1952 he held his first solo exhibition at the Waddington Galleries. Time magazine:

"Irish critics got a look at the work of a tousled young (25) man named Paddy Swift and tossed their caps in the air. Paddy's 30 canvases are as grey and gloomy as Dublin itself – harshly realistic paintings of dead birds and rabbits, frightened-looking girls and twisted potted plants. Their fascination is in the merciless, sharply etched details, as oppressive and inquiring as a back-room third degree. Dublin Understands. Wrote Critic Tony Gray in the Irish Times: Swift 'unearths [from his subjects] not a story, nor a decorative pattern, nor even a mood, but some sort of tension which is a property of their existence.' Said the Irish Press: 'An almost embarrassing candor... Here is a painter who seems to have gone back to the older tradition and to have given the most searching consideration to the composition of his painting.' Dublin, which likes authors who write with a shillelagh, understood an artist who painted with one. The Word Is Tension. By 1950, Paddy was in Paris... Nights, he went to the galleries, and there he found what he wanted to do. He liked such old French masters as the 17th century's Nicolas Poussin, the 19th century's Eugène Delacroix, such moderns as Switzerland's Alberto Giacometti and Britain's Francis Bacon. The much-admired decorative style of the Matisses is not for Paddy Swift. 'Art,' he thinks, 'is obviously capable of expressing something more closely related to life than these elegant designs.' His main idea is to suggest the tensions he finds in life. 'I believe when you bring, say, a plant into a room, everything in that room changes in relation to it. This tension – tension is the only word for it – can be painted.'" This may have been Swift's only interview. A motif of his work at this time was his bird imagery, which appear to have symbolic overtones, and may have even been a subtle form of self-portraiture. From early on he was involved with literary magazines, such as The Bell and Envoy, contributing the occasional critical piece on art and artists he admired (e.g.Nano Reid, who painted Swift's portrait in 1950). He formed part of the group of artists and writers who were involved with Envoy. Dublin portraits include Patrick Kavanagh, Anthony Cronin, John Jordan, Patrick Pye, and Julia O'Faolain. During this period he also got to know the likes of Samuel Beckett (possibly one portrait) and Edward McGuire. Following the Waddington exhibition Swift moved to London in November 1952, using it as his base, with occasional trips to Dublin and stays in France, Italy, Oakridge and the Digswell Arts Trust.

=== Italy, Oakridge & Digswell Arts Trust ===
In 1954 he was awarded a grant by the Irish Cultural Relations Committee to study art in Italy. He was accompanied by his future wife, Oonagh Ryan. Following his year in Italy Swift returned to Dublin, via Paris and London, for Christmas 1955, where Oonagh wanted to be for the birth of their first child. He then returned to London in 1956 and accepted Elizabeth Smart's offer to share Winstone Cottage (then owned by John Rothenstein), which contained a studio, in Oakridge, Gloucestershire. October 1958 – October 1959 he held a fellowship at the Digswell Arts Trust, for a period sharing a studio with Michael Andrews. During his residency at Digswell he painted many views of Ashwell and its Springs, one of which was presented by Henry Morris to Comberton Village College at its opening in 1959.

=== London ===
Swift was familiar with London and its literary and artistic circles by the early 1950s. In 1953 he shared a flat with Anthony Cronin in Camden but actually used it as his studio, staying instead with Oonagh in Hampstead – it was at this point that Swift and Wright first discussed the idea of creating a new literary magazine, a quarterly which would publish writing on artistic issues they felt to be of importance. 1957–58 he had a flat and studio in Eccleston Square. 1959–62 he lived in Westbourne Terrace (Elizabeth Smart lived upstairs), and it was during this period that he founded X magazine

In London his work grew more expressive. Brian Fallon: "In London his style changed, not immediately, but gradually and very thoroughly. In fact, it was less a stylistic change than a transformation. From being a painter with sharp, angular lines and a thin paint surface, he became one who 'drew with the brush'. Modelled in heavy, laden strokes, and in general, daubed and dragged the paint around until it did his bidding. Stylistically, his 'first period' and 'second period' could hardly be more different from one another, though the underlying sensibility somehow remains."

London portraits include the poets George Barker, Patrick Kavanagh, David Wright, Brian Higgins, John Heath-Stubbs, Paul Potts, C. H. Sisson, and David Gascoyne. At the time Swift was sometimes referred to as the "poets' painter" – many of his close friends were poets and they seem to have regarded him as "their" painter. Apart from close family members, poets were almost exclusively subjects of his portraits. Regarding these London portraits Fallon says, "once again, his approach was basically humanist, not formalist... [these London portraits] are among the finest portraits painted in Britain at this period... Yet they were seen by only a handful of people, and in some cases were even lucky to have survived." In 1962 Swift left London for an extended trip to southern Europe.

=== Algarve ===
Swift's travels led him to the small fishing village of Carvoeiro in the Algarve. He was so enchanted with the place that he remained. In Algarve he painted, wrote and illustrated books on Portugal and founded Porches Pottery (Olaria Algarve). He designed the building that houses Porches Pottery, along with several other buildings. He exhibited: drawings for Algarve: a portrait and a guide at the Diário de Notícias Gallery, Lisbon (1965); an exhibition of Porches Pottery at the Galeria Diário de Notícias, Lisbon (1970); an exhibition of his paintings at Galeria S Mamede, Lisbon (1974). He designed the sets for The Merry Wives of Windsor at the Portuguese National Theatre Company, Lisbon (1977). Swift lived and worked in the Algarve from 1962 until his premature death, from an inoperable brain tumour, in 1983. His work from this period includes portraits of his friend Francisco de Sá Carneiro (who commissioned Swift to paint his portrait when he was elected Prime Minister in 1980) and his partner, Snu Abecassis (Danish-born journalist and editor who founded the Portuguese publishing house, Publicações Dom Quixote). Swift is buried in the Igreja Matriz church in Porches, for which he designed the stations of the cross.

== Criticism and X magazine ==
In Dublin and London he partook of artistic and, always, literary life, and from early on was involved with literary magazines. In London he founded and co-edited, with the poet David Wright, X magazine, for which he contributed articles under the pseudonym "James Mahon" (Swift's mother was a Mahon from County Wicklow). Wright declared Swift to be "the true begetter and leading light of X", noting that he "was of course responsible for the art side of the magazine ... nor was he any less active on the literary side of the magazine. Here Swift and I worked in perfect harmony." Aside from his involvement with X magazine, Swift was instrumental in several writers and poets having their work published, such as Patrick Kavanagh, John McGahern (first published in X magazine), C. H. Sisson, Brian Higgins and David Wright. David Wright regarding Swift promoting his own work: "Swift and Cronin... brought me to the attention of the publisher Derek Verschoyle – and this was typical of Swift, who would take immense pains to push the product of anybody whose work he believed in, yet never bothered to promote his own."

Brian Fallon wrote:

X, a remarkable publication which, in some respects, was light years ahead of its time ... Swift's criticism is that of the practicing artist not that of a practicing critic, and when speaking of his criticism I do not merely mean only his occasional critical essays, but his activity as co-editor of a magazine and as champion of Bacon, Freud, Auerbach, Craigie Aitchison, Nano Reid, Giacometti and David Bomberg (whose posthumous papers he edited). This is criticism in the valid, active, propagandistic sense, not merely the daily or weekly grind of reviewing all sorts and conditions of artists, good and bad, but mostly mediocre. Once again much of Swift's activity in this field was semi-underground, almost subversive, often done in the teeth of the modernist establishment of his day. His record in this field speaks for itself... I cannot think of any other Irish painter who achieved anything like what he did as a critic and editor and discoverer of talent, and very few painters in any other country either. Wyndham Lewis, it is true, was a verbose propagandist, but on the whole he was a bad critic, and somehow his propaganda almost always turns out to be some form of self-aggrandisement, whereas Swift almost always pushed the fortunes and reputations of his friends and almost never his own. Yet, you do not get, from his general stance, that his motives were simply friendship and good intentions. There is a tone of dedication throughout, as though he was serving art, and not merely artists... It is a peculiarity of his very individual psyche and personality that Swift cannot be 'placed' purely as a painter. He was an artist in the broad sense before he was specifically a painter, and his context embraces literature and other disciplines besides painting or drawing (It is noticeable that he had more friends who were literary men than friends who were painters). Swift is not a painter's painter, he is an artist's artist, a man whose mentality overlapped into other fields besides his own chosen one.

== Posthumous ==
In 1993 Gandon Editions published a biography of Swift to coincide with the IMMA Retrospective. The IMMA Retrospective was acclaimed by critics and artists alike. In 2002 the Department of Foreign Affairs (who also awarded Swift the grant to study in Italy) sponsored the "Patrick Swift: An Irish Artist in Portugal" exhibitions that were held at the Crawford Municipal Gallery, Cork, and Palacio Foz in Lisbon. In 2004 Swift's work appeared on the BBC Antiques Roadshow. In 2005 the Office of Public Works, Dublin, held an exhibition of paintings, drawings and watercolours by Swift. His portrait of Patrick Kavanagh forms part of the CIÉ (Irish state transport authority) collection and recently toured as part of the "CIE: Art on the Move" exhibitions to much acclaim. Two pictures from IMMA's permanent collection, Forget-me-[K]nots on a Cane Table & London Self-Portrait, were exhibited in "The Moderns" exhibition (IMMA, October 2010 – February 2011).

== Bibliography ==
- Patrick Swift 1927–83 – PS...of course, Veronica O'Mara (ed.), Gandon Editions, Kinsale (1993). ISBN 0-946641-37-4
- An Anthology from X, selected by David Wright, Oxford University Press (1988). ISBN 0-19-212266-5
- Patrick Swift 1927–83, Irish Museum of Modern Art Retrospective Catalogue(1993); Anthony Cronin (poet) and Aidan Dunne (art critic). ISBN 1-873654-12-X
- An Irish Painter in Portugal, Gandon Editions (2001); contributions by Fernando de Azvedo (painter and President of Sociedade de Bellas Artes, Lisbon), Peter Murray (Director Crawford Gallery, Cork) and Brian Fallon's "Patrick Swift and Irish art". ISBN 0-946846-75-8
- Dictionary of Irish Artists, Theo Snoddy, Merlin Publishing, Dublin (2002), p. 640
- X, Volume 1, Numbers 1–4, November 1959 – October 1960, Barrie & Rockliff (1961)
- Patrick Swift and David Wright produced three books on Portugal, all illustrated by Swift: Algarve: a portrait and a guide (Barrie & Rockliff, London, 1965); Minho: a portrait and a guide (Barrie & Rockliff, London, 1968); Lisbon: a portrait and a guide (Barrie & Rockliff, London, 1971)
- Patrick Swift, Seeds of Renewal, 2018, Camara Municipal de Lagoa, ISBN 978-989-8888-36-5

Illustrated

- (A guide to) Birds of Southern Portugal, Randolph Cary, Barrie & Rockliff, London (1973)
- Algarve: a portrait and a guide (1965); Minho: a portrait and a guide (1968); Lisbon: a portrait and a guide (1971)
- Das harte Leben, Heinrich Böll's German translation of Flann O'Brien's The Hard Life, German edition (1966)
- My Love to the Beaks and Tails, Annie Sise, Readers Union (1976). ISBN 0-575-01955-7
- The Canterbury tales, translated into modern English prose by David Wright (London, Harris, 1964); endpapers by Patrick Swift.
- A Patrick Kavanagh Anthology, Platt, Eugene Robert, Ed., Commedia Publishing Co., Dublin (1973); portrait of Kavanagh
- Dead as Doornails, Anthony Cronin, Dolmen Press, Dublin (1976); portrait of Anthony Cronin on the cover
- Martello Spring 1984, Maureen Charlton & John Stafford, Blackrock: Ardmore Records (1984); illustrated with 6 coloured plates by Irish artists incl. Walter Osborne, Patrick Swift & R.B. Beechey.

Relating to

- Patrick Kavanagh: A Biography, Antoinette Quinn, Gill & Macmillan (2003)
- The Chameleon Poet: A Life of George Barker, Robert Fraser, Jonathan Cape (2001)
- Young John McGahern: Becoming a Novelist, Denis Sampson, Oxford University Press (2012). ISBN 978-0-19-964177-2.
- Love of the World, John McGahern, Essays, Edited by Stanley van der Ziel, Faber and Faber (2009); "The Bird Swift".
- Edward McGuire – RHA, Brian Fallon, Irish Academic Press (1991)
- Remembering How We Stood, John Ryan, Gill and Macmillan, Dublin (1975)
- Dead as Doornails, Anthony Cronin, Dolmen Press, Dublin (1976); includes a portrait of Anthony Cronin by Swift on the cover
- On the Look-out, CH Sission, Carcanet Press, Manchester (1989).
- The Collected Poems of Elizabeth Smart, David Gascoyne (ed.) (Paladin, London, 1992)
- By Heart – The Life of Elizabeth Smart, Rosemary Sullivan (Flamingo, London, 1992)
- Selected Poems, Homage to George Barker (On his Sixtieth Birthday), John Heath-Stubbs & Martin Green, -eds, Martin Brian & O'Keefe Ltd (1973); includes Swift's portrait of Barker and Swift's essay on Barker, "Prolegomenon to George Barker".
- Selected Poems, David Wright, Carcanet Press Ltd (1 July 1988); "Images for a Painter". ISBN 0-85635-753-7
- The Moderns, IMMA, Irish artists and writers – the development of modern Ireland through its arts in the period from the 1900s to 1970s (2011)
- Modern Art in Ireland, Dorothy Walker, The Lilliput Press (1997)
- Crystal Clear: The Selected Prose of John Jordan, ed. by Hugh McFadden, Lilliput Press (2006). ISBN 1-84351-066-9
- "Lucian Freud: Prophet of Discomfort", Mic Moroney, Irish Arts Review (2007)
- Night Thoughts: The Surreal Life of the Poet David Gascoyne, Robert Fraser (OUP 2012)
- Trespassers: A Memoir, Julia O'Faolain (Faber & Faber 2013)
- PN Review: Patrick Swift Obituary, PN Review 34, Volume 10 Number 2, November – December 1983 ; Fourteen Letters (to David Wright), C.H. Sisson, PN Review 39, Volume 11 Number 1, July – August 1984.
- Selected Poems, John Jordan, ed. Hugh McFadden, Dedalus Press, Dublin ( 2008); "Second Letter: To Patrick Swift"
- Collected Poems, C.H. Sission, Carcanet Press Ltd (1998); "For Patrick Swift"

Selected articles

- "Patrick Swift", John Ryan, Envoy, vol 5/20 (July 1951)
- "Young artist of promise", G.H.G, The Irish Times, 3 October 1952
- 'AN IRISHMAN'S DIARY' – QUIDNUNC (Seamus Kelly), The Irish Times, 11 October 1952
- 'Art: Life with a Shillelagh', Time Magazine, 20 October 1952
- "The Fall and Rise of Patrick Swift", Brian Fallon, The Irish Times, 11 June 1992
- "The lost hope of Irish art", Aidan Dunne, The Sunday Tribune, 28 November 1993
- "The legacy of Patrick Swift", Brian Fallon, The Irish Times, 2 December 1993

Catalogues

- Paintings by Patrick Swift at the Victor Waddington Galleries, 8 South Anne Street, Dublin (1952); copy held at the National Library of Ireland.
- Pinturas de Patrick Swift, Galeria S Mamede, Lisbon (1974)
- Patrick Swift 1927–83, Irish Museum of Modern Art Retrospective Catalogue (1993)

== Solo exhibitions ==
- 2018 Patrick Swift, Seeds of Renewal, Convento de S. José, Lagoa
- 2005 Paintings, drawings and watercolours by Patrick Swift, Office of Public Works Atrium, Dublin, Ireland
- 2002 An Irish Painter in Portugal Retrospective, Crawford Municipal Art Gallery, Cork
- 1994 Patrick Swift 1927–83, Ulster Museum, Belfast
- 1993 Patrick Swift 1927–83, Irish Museum of Modern Art Retrospective, Dublin
- 1974 Pinturas de Patrick Swift, Galeria S Mamede, Lisbon
- 1965 Desenhos do Algarve, Diário de Notícias Gallery, Lisbon; an exhibition of Swift's drawings for Algarve: a portrait and a guide
- 1952 Paintings by Patrick Swift, Victor Waddington Galleries, Dublin

== Group exhibitions ==
- New Portraits, National Gallery of Ireland (Dec 2013 – Feb 2014), Portrait of Anthony Cronin
- The Moderns, IMMA, October 2010– February 2011; Forget-me-[K]nots on a Cane Table & London Self-Portrait – from IMMA's permanent collection
- Lunds Konsthall, Sweden, 1972; Study (with Holly), a painting from his first group exhibition, Irish Exhibition of Living Art, 1950; Study (with Holly) was also exhibited at the Cork Rosc, Irish Art 1943–73, 1980
- Portrait of Patrick Kavanagh (CIÉ collection): RHA, 1968; 1971 ROSC exhibition, The Irish Imagination; in 2005 it toured as part of the "CIE: Art on the Move" exhibitions
- Contemporary Arts Society Exhibition, Whitechapel Gallery, London, 1961; the Contemporary Arts Society bought The Garden (1959) and presented it to the Warrington Museum & Art Gallery
- "Drawings, watercolours, gouache, ceramics", Victor Waddington Galleries, Dublin, 1954; five watercolours
- Contemporary Irish Art, National Library of Wales, Aberystwth, 1953
- Leicester Galleries, Jan 1952, Plants in a Potting Shed
- Irish Exhibition of Living Art (1950, 51, 52, 54, 56)

== Collections ==
- National Gallery of Ireland: Portrait of the Poet, Anthony Cronin; Girl in a Garden; Gnarled Olive Tree, Image.
- IMMA:Forget-me-Knots on a cane table; Self-Portrait in the Studio
- National Portrait Gallery (London): Patrick Kavanagh
- Ulster Museum, National Museums Northern Ireland, Positano Palm Tree
- National Self-Portrait Collection of Ireland, University of Limerick: Self-Portrait, c. 1950, ink on paper Image
- Warrington Museum & Art Gallery, The Garden
- Glebe Gallery, Trees at St. Columb's, oil Image
- Dublin Writers Museum, Portrait of Patrick Kavanagh
- CIE Collection, Art on the move, Portrait of Patrick Kavanagh
- The Kelly Collection (Kelly's Resort Hotel Rosslare), Trees in London, oil on board; image in For the Love of Art, The Kelly Collection

== Articles by Swift ==
- "David Wright", PN Review 14, Volume 6 Number 6, July – August 1980
- "Prolegomenon to George Barker", X, vol. I, No. 3, June 1960; also published in John Heath-Stubbs and Martin Green (eds) Homage to George Barker on his 60th Birthday (Martin Brian & O'Keefe, London, 1973)
- "The Bomberg Papers", edited by Swift, X, vol.1, no.3, June 1960; An Anthology from X (Oxford University Press, 1988)
- "The Painter in the Press" (under the pseudonym "James Mahon"), X A Quarterly Review, vol. I, no.4, October 1960; An Anthology from X (OUP 1988) read article
- "Official Art & The Modern Painter" (under the pseudonym "James Mahon"), X Quarterly Review, vol. I, no., November 1959
- "Mob Morals and the Art of loving Art" (under the pseudonym "James Mahon"), X A Quarterly Review, vol. I, no.3, June 1960; An Anthology from X (OUP 1988)
- "Some notes on Caravaggio", Nimbus, Winter 1956 read article
- "By Way of Preface" (taken from "A Report to the Committee of Cultural Relations, Dept of External Affairs, on a Year spent in Italy in the study of Art & Painting, December 1955"), Gandon Editions Biography, 1993 read article
- "Painting – The RHA Exhibition", The Bell, vol. 17, no. 13, June 1951
- "The Artist Speaks", Envoy – A Review of Literature and Art, Vol. 4, no. 15, Feb 1951 read article
- "Nano Reid", Envoy – A Review of Literature and Art, March 1950 read article
