= Malcolm Quantrill =

British architect

- Born: 25 May 1931; Norwich, Norfolk, England
- Died: 22 September 2009 (aged 78); College Station, Texas, US
- Education: University of Liverpool, University of Pennsylvania and Wroclaw Technical University
- Occupation: Architect
- Awards: Knight of the Order of the Lion of Finland
- Practice: Architect, academic and architecture theorist

Malcolm Quantrill (25 May 1931 – 22 September 2009) was a British architect, academic and architecture theorist. His best known books are The Environmental Memory – Man and Architecture in the Landscape of Ideas (1986) and Finnish Architecture and the Modernist Tradition (1998). He was a specialist in the history of the modern architecture of Finland. He was the first person to write critical monographs in any language on three individual Finnish modernist architects, Alvar Aalto – Alvar Aalto: A Critical Study (1983) – Reima Pietilä – Reima Pietilä: Architecture, Context, Modernism (1985) – and Juha Leiviskä – Juha Leiviska and the Continuity of Finnish Modern Architecture (2001). Already during his lifetime, he acquired a reputation for thorough and innovative scholarship in architecture, bringing a questioning attitude to well-known figures and canonical architectural history.

== Early life and education ==
Quantrill was born on 25 May 1931, in Norwich, the only child of Arthur William Quantrill, a shoe pattern maker, and Alice May Quantrill (née Newstead). He attended school at the City of Norwich School. He graduated with a BA in architecture from the University of Liverpool in 1954. He was a Fulbright Scholar and Albert Kahn Memorial Fellow at the University of Pennsylvania, US, earning a master's degree in 1955. On his return to the UK, he worked in architects' offices in London, qualifying as an architect and becoming a member of the Royal Institute of British Architects in 1961. He received a DSc in Urbanism from Wroclaw Technical University, Poland, in 1975.

== Career and scholarship ==
Quantrill taught at the schools of architecture at the University of Jordan, the former University of Wales Institute of Science and Technology (UWIST), University College, London, and the University of Liverpool before becoming director of the Architectural Association in London from 1967 to 1969. From 1973 to 1980 he was Head of Environmental Design at the Polytechnic of North London. He was appointed Professor of Architecture at Texas A&M University in 1984. He was promoted to Distinguished Professor at the same university in 1986, and upon retirement in 2007 was named Distinguished Professor Emeritus.

Quantrill's book on Alvar Aalto, Alvar Aalto: A Critical Study (1983), broke the mould of previous monographs that tended to be hagiographic eulogies of the master of modernist architecture. He set Aalto in his historical context, both in regard to world architecture history and that of Finnish architecture. It was therefore no surprise that this project led to further scholarship in to the history of Finnish architecture, the culmination being the wide history of Finnish modern architecture, Finnish Architecture and the Modernist Tradition (1995).

== Honours ==
Quantrill held visiting professorships at the Vienna University of Technology, Austria, the University of Oulu, Finland, Monterrey Institute of Technology, Mexico, and Carleton University, Canada. In 1988, he was made a Knight of the Order of the Lion of Finland in recognition of his contributions to Finnish architecture. He was made a Distinguished Professor of the Association of Collegiate Schools of Architecture in 1990. In 2003, he received the Haecker Distinguished Leadership in Architectural Research Award from the Architectural Research Consortium of North America. He was invited to become a member of the Garrick Club, a gentleman's club in London in 1971. He died in Texas on 22nd September 2009 and his ashes were interred in Highgate Cemetery on 19th July 2010.

== Publications ==
- Ritual and Response in Architecture, London: Lund Humphries (1974)
- Alvar Aalto: A Critical Study, London: Secker & Warburg (1983)
- Reima Pietilä: Architecture, Context and Modernism, New York: Rizzoli (1985)
- The Environmental Memory – Man and Architecture in the Landscape of Ideas, New York: Schocken (1987)
- One Man's Odyssey in Search of Finnish Architecture: An Anthology in Honour of Reima Pietilä, Helsinki: Rakennustietosäätiö (1988)
- Urban Forms, Suburban Dreams, edited by Malcolm Quantrill and Bruce Webb. College Station (Tex.): Texas A & M University Press (1993)
- The Culture of Silence – Architecture's Fifth Dimension, edited by Malcolm Quantrill and Bruce Webb. College Station (Tex.): Texas A&M University Press (1998)
- Finnish Architecture and the Modernist Tradition, London: Taylor & Francis (1995)
- The Norman Foster Studio: Consistency Through Diversity, London: Taylor & Francis (2000)
- Juha Leiviska and the Continuity of Finnish Modern Architecture, Chichester: Wiley-Academy (2001)
- Plain Modern: The Architecture of Brian MacKay-Lyons (New Voices in Architecture), New York: Princeton Architectural Press (2005)
- The Unmade Bed of Architecture, Malcolm Quantrill and Matti K. Makinen, Helsinki: Rakennustieto Publishing (2008)
- The Ark of Architecture: Selected Writings of Malcolm Quantrill, Helsinki: Rakennustieto Publishing (2009)
