= Robert Wells (poet) =

Robert Wells (born 1947) is a UK poet and fellow of the Royal Society of Literature.

Wells was born in Oxford, where his father was a don and his mother a teacher. He attended King's College, Cambridge from 1965 to 1968, and worked as a woodsman on Exmoor in 1977, the year The Winter's Task: Poems was published. From 1979 to 1982 he taught English in Italy, Iran, and Leicester.

He has written freelance and translated Virgil and Theocritus. Early on, he collaborated with his friends Dick Davis and Clive Wilmer on a book of poems, Shade Mariners. Michael Schmidt included some of his poems in two anthologies. Carcanet published his poetry books The Winter's Task (1977), Selected Poems (1986), Lusus (1999) and "The Day and other Poems" (2006), and his verse translations, Virgil's Georgics (1982) and Theocritus' Idylls (1988). His Collected Poems and Translations was published in 2009.

Wells' poetry was inspired first by Virgil's Georgics and then by his own experiences working as a woodsman. In it, he explored man's experience of "landscape, how it might be lived in and worked in, recorded and celebrated." Staudt says that "The Winter's Tale," the title poem of The Winter's Task, "celebrates the laborer's pursuit of work for its own sake, as he moves out of himself and lays hold of a fundamental and objective reality ".

He is married, with two children, and lives in France.

== Books ==
- The Winter's Task (1977)
- Selected Poems (1986)
- Lusus (1999)
- The Day and other poems (2006)
- Virgil's Georgics (1982) (verse translation)
- Theocritus' Idylls (1988) (verse translation)
- Collected Poems and Translations (2009)
