= Gordon Wharton =

British poet (1929–2011)

Gordon Kenneth Alexander Wharton (19 April 1929 – 2 December 2011) was a British poet.

== Biography ==
Gordon Kenneth Alexander Wharton was born in High Wycombe, Buckinghamshire on 19 April 1929. He left school aged 14 and said that anything he learned afterwards was self-taught. He started publishing poems from the age of about 21 and he became co-editor of the now-defunct literary magazine Chanticleer with the Irish poet, Patrick Galvin, at around the same time. Shortly afterwards he started reviewing regularly for the Times Literary Supplement, mainly dealing with modern and 17th-century poetry.

Wharton listed among the prime influences on his work Dylan Thomas, Andrew Marvell and ("inevitably") W.H. Auden. More recently, as may be evident from some of his later poems, the more economical style of Ian Hamilton has been an influence. Meanwhile, in his more prosaic working life, he graduated from carpentry, via work on a travelling fair and a period dealing in antiques, to travel journalism; in fact he was founder-editor of the weekly Travelnews, a newspaper serving the travel industry.

Wharton published two small collections of verse in the mid to late 1950s: This and That (Fantasy Press 1955) and Errors of Observation (The School of Art, University of Reading 1957) and issue number 8 of The Poet magazine in 1954 was devoted entirely to his poems.

Wharton started submitting poetry for publication after a break of some 30 years. He has been published more recently in literary magazines such as Ambit (http://www.poetrymagazines.org.uk/magazine/record.asp?id=7502), London Magazine and The Rialto. His third volume, Towards Oblivion, was published shortly before his death.

Gordon Wharton died on 2 December 2011, at the age of 82.
