= Thomas Blackburn (poet) =

British poet and writer

Thomas Blackburn FRSL
- Born: Thomas Eliel Fenwick Blackburn; 10 February 1916; Hensingham, Cumberland, England
- Died: 13 August 1977 (aged 61); Snowdonia, Wales
- Education: Durham University (BA, English)
- Occupations: Poet, lecturer, educator
- Writing career
- Years active: 1940–1977
- Genres: Poetry, memoir, Gothic fiction
- Subjects: Self-examination, spiritual imagery, childhood trauma

Thomas Eliel Fenwick Blackburn (10 February 1916 – 13 August 1977) was a British poet whose work was characterised by its self-examination and spiritual imagery.

His memoir, A Clip of Steel (1969), describes the effects of a traumatic childhood under a repressive clergyman father.

== Early life and education ==
Blackburn was born in Hensingham, Cumberland, England. Of mixed ancestry, his father Eliel was the product of an affair his missionary grandfather had with a Mauritian woman. The mother disappeared once she returned to Mauritius, and Eliel was raised by his uncle, who brought him up to be a passionate Anglican. As a young boy, Blackburn was forced by Eliel to wear a painful chastity device intended to prevent masturbation. His father, haunted by feelings of racial inferiority, also repeatedly scrubbed his face with peroxide in order to lighten his complexion. Alan Morrison, discussing this experience, noted that "Blackburn" is "a cruelly apt surname for someone whose father used to literally try to burn the black off his skin".

Blackburn attended Bromsgrove School. He studied law at Selwyn College, Cambridge at the insistence of his father. Numerous incidents of misbehaviour, culminating in the discovery of a contraceptive in his room, saw him expelled during his third year.

This was followed by a short spell as an articled clerk; then Brookfield Hall, a treatment centre for alcoholics and drug-addicts, where he was expelled for drunkenly attempting to seduce the wife of one of the medical staff; and finally several months of shock therapy at the hands of a Harley Street doctor.

He completed a course in psychology at Birkbeck, University of London, before going on to study English at Durham University. He graduated from Durham in 1940.

== Career ==
=== Early career ===
Blackburn moved to London after university and became involved with the Soho literary scene. During the Second World War he served briefly in the Merchant Navy, leaving after contracting jaundice, and instead lectured for the National Fire Service. From 1945 to 1947 he worked at King's School, Rochester, and then joined Marylebone Grammar School, where he was promoted to English Master in 1954. During the 1950s he began to receive some recognition as a poet and published his first collections, most notably In the Fire (1956) and The Next Word (1958).

From 1956 he took a two-year sabbatical from teaching to become Gregory Fellow in Poetry at the University of Leeds, having been nominated for the role by his predecessor, John Heath-Stubbs. He agreed after being persuaded by the Leeds academic Bonamy Dobrée. These were apparently two of the busier years of his life, with Blackburn participating in a myriad of university and student activities: he edited an undergraduate poetry journal, Poetry and Audience; held regular poetry sessions at his home in Headingley, sometimes with friends and fellow poets Michael Hamburger and George Barker; and helped produce the Leeds University Verse anthology. He also developed a close friendship with the literary critic G. Wilson Knight.

=== Later career ===
In 1960 he published A Smell of Burning, which strengthened his critical reputation. One of the poems from this collection, "Sediment", about his father, won the Guinness Poetry Prize. A Clip of Steel, a memoir of his childhood and early adulthood, was released in 1969. This book was followed two years later by the only novel he published, The Feast of the Wolf, which is inspired by the vampire myth. While fictional, its frank depiction of mental illness and substance abuse was likely influenced by Blackburn's own experiences.

Blackburn taught at the College of St. Mark and St. John in Chelsea, London, as well as other educational institutions. He served as Chair of the English Department at St. Mark and St. John from 1960 until 1973, when the college decided to move to Plymouth and he opted to remain in London. He was soon hired by Whitelands College (now part of the University of Roehampton), retiring in early 1976.

== Critical reception and legacy ==
In his review of A Smell of Burning for Poetry, the literary critic Gene Baro identified the conflict between "the darker human impulses" and the need for "spiritual integration" as the defining theme of Blackburn's work. His earliest verses were stylistically influenced by W. B. Yeats, and X. J. Kennedy, commenting in the New York Times Book Review, noted that, while reading Blackburn, "one at times feels as though a rather weary shade of Yeats had been reincarnated".

Although Blackburn published throughout his life — even during periods of crisis — he did not succeed in reaching the "first rank" of British poets.

== Personal life ==
Blackburn was married three times. With his second wife, the painter Rosalie de Meric, he had a daughter, Julia Blackburn, born in 1948. He struggled with alcoholism and suffered several mental breakdowns during his life.

Outside of literature, his main passion was mountaineering, which he first took up while a student at Durham University.

=== Death ===
Blackburn died on 13 August 1977 at his cottage in Snowdonia.

Accounts of his death differ. One version states he died from a cerebral haemorrhage while getting into bed, having just finished a letter to his brother John. Alternatively, Contemporary Authors reports the cause as an "apparently deliberate" overdose of anti-depressants.

== Selected publications ==
=== Poetry ===
- Blackburn, Thomas (1956). In the Fire. London: Putnam.
- ——— (1958). The Next Word. London: Putnam.
- ——— (1961). A Smell of Burning. London: Putnam.
- ——— (1971). The Fourth Man. London: MacGibbon & Kee. ISBN 9780261631953.
- ——— (1975). Selected Poems of Thomas Blackburn (1st ed.). London: Hutchinson. ISBN 9780091229405.
- ——— (1975). The Devil's Kitchen. London: Chatto & Windus. ISBN 9780701150761.
- ——— (1980). Bread for the Winter Birds. London: Hutchinson. ISBN 9780091430801.

=== Prose ===
- Blackburn, Thomas (1969). A Clip of Steel: A Picaresque Autobiography (1st ed.). London: MacGibbon & Kee. ISBN 9780261631472.
- ——— (1971). The Feast of the Wolf (1st ed.). London: MacGibbon & Kee. ISBN 9780261632141.

=== Monograph ===
- Blackburn, Thomas (1967). Robert Browning: A Study of His Poetry (1st ed.). London: Eyre & Spottiswoode.

== See also ==
- List of alumni of Hatfield College, Durham
- List of Durham University people
