= Paul Potts (writer) =

British poet

Paul Hugh Howard Potts (19 July 1911 – 26 August 1990), a British-born poet who lived in British Columbia in his youth, was the author of Dante Called You Beatrice (1960), a memoir of unrequited love. One of the women treated in the memoir was Jean Hore, who married the writer Philip O'Connor but ended up confined as a schizophrenic for over fifty years until her death.

== Family ==
Potts was born in Datchet, Berkshire to (Arthur George) Howard Potts (1869-1918), who had emigrated to Victoria, British Columbia, Canada, where he was a partner in a bakery and confectionery business, and his Irish wife Julia Helen Kavanagh (also recorded as Cavanagh). Arthur Potts's father, Dr Walter Jeffery Potts (1837-1898), had married Julia, daughter of Sir Thomas Branthwaite Beevor, 3rd Baronet; many descendants with the name 'Beevor-Potts' live in Canada.

== Education ==
He was educated in Canada, England (at Stonyhurst until the age of sixteen) and Italy (at a Jesuit college in Florence), but from the early 1930s he lived in London. He frequented the Soho-Fitzrovia area where he would sell broadsheet copies of his poetry in the streets and pubs.

== Literary career ==
Among Potts's literary friends were George Orwell and the English poet George Barker. Potts's memoir of Orwell, "Don Quixote on a Bicycle", appeared in The London Magazine in 1957 and became a chapter of Dante Called You Beatrice. His 1948 essay “The World of George Barker” appeared in Poetry Quarterly.

== Later life ==
In late middle-age, Potts was '...balding' with 'a stutter that he mixed with rapid blinking and an amused chuckle as he started a sentence', eventually becoming a dissolute figure 'barred from Soho pubs'.

== Accidental death ==
Potts died in 1990 of smoke inhalation from a fire in his bedroom; he had been house-bound for some years.

== Bibliography ==
- (1940) A Poet's Testament, with drawings by Cliff Bayliss and Scott MacGregor, foreword by Hugh MacDiarmid
- (1944) Instead of a Sonnet (enlarged 1978)
- (1960) Dante Called You Beatrice
- (1970) To Keep A Promise
- (1973) Invitation to a Sacrament
- (2006) Ronald Caplan (ed.), George Orwell's Friend: Selected Writings by Paul Potts

== See also ==
- Children of Albion: Poetry of the Underground in Britain (1969)
- Faber Book of Twentieth Century Verse (1953)
- New Lyrical Ballads (1945)
