= Sidney Keyes =

English poet

- Born: Sidney Arthur Kilworth Keyes; 27 May 1922
- Died: 29 April 1943 (aged 20); Tunisia
- Cause of death: Killed in action
- Education: University of Oxford
- Occupation: Poet
- Writing career
- Notable awards: Hawthornden Prize

Sidney Arthur Kilworth Keyes (27 May 1922 – 29 April 1943) was an English poet of World War II.

== Life ==
=== Early years and education ===
Keyes was born on 27 May 1922 at the family home, only child of Reginald Keyes, of The Homestead, West Hill, Dartford, Kent, a flour miller who had been a captain in the Queen's Own Royal West Kent Regiment, and his second wife, Edith Mary, daughter of Rev. Arthur Blackburn, rector of St Paul's, Bradford. His mother died of peritonitis when he was six weeks old, and he was raised by his paternal grandparents. His grandfather, Sidney Kilworth Keyes, was a wealthy farmer and dominant figure in the family. Keyes started writing poetry when still very young, with Wordsworth, Rilke and Jung among his main influences. He attended Dartford Grammar School and then boarded at Tonbridge School (Hillside, 1935-1940), after which he won a history scholarship to Queen's College, Oxford. While at college, Keyes wrote the only two books of his lifetime, The Cruel Solstice and The Iron Laurel. During his time in Oxford, Keyes fell in love with the young German artist Milein Cosman, but his love was not returned. He also befriended fellow poets John Heath-Stubbs and Michael Meyer, edited The Cherwell magazine, and formed a dramatic society.

The Iron Laurel was published during World War II in 1942, when Keyes was 20 years old. His poetry was also published in the New Statesman, The Listener and other poetry journals.

=== Military service ===
Keyes left Oxford and joined the British Army in April 1942, entering active service that same year. He was soon commissioned in the Queens Own Royal West Kent Regiment and served with his regiment's 1st Battalion, part of the 4th Division, to fight in the final stages of the Tunisian campaign in March 1943. Prior to his service, Keyes had already written more than half of the 110 poems that would later be gathered in The Collected Poems of Sidney Keyes. During combat, he was reported to have continued writing poetry. However, these works have not survived.

=== Death ===
Keyes was killed in action on 29 April 1943, covering his platoon's retreat during a counter-attack, shortly before his 21st birthday. It has also been stated that he died at the hands of the enemy, following his capture.

== Recognition ==
In 1943, Keyes was awarded the Hawthornden Prize for The Cruel Solstice and The Iron Laurel. He has been described as one of the outstanding poets of the Second World War.

== Bibliography ==
- Berryman, John (1947), "Review: Young Poets Dead", The Sewanee Review, 55 (3), Johns Hopkins University Press
- Hynes, Samuel (1990), "Review: Sidney Keyes, Poet", The Sewanee Review, 98 (2), Johns Hopkins University Press
- Dickey, James (March 2004), Donald Greiner (ed.), Classes on Modern Poets and the Art of Poetry, University of South Carolina Press, ISBN 9781570035289
- Kendall, Tim (2006), Modern English War Poetry, Oxford University Press, ISBN 978-0-19-927676-9
- Kendall, Tim; Geoffrey Hill (2009), The Oxford Handbook of British and Irish War Poetry, Oxford University Press, ISBN 978-0-19-955960-2
- Cosman, Milein, Memories of Sidney Keyes
- Roy, Pinaki. “Sidney Keyes: The War-poet who ‘groped for Death’”. War, Literature and the Arts (U.S. Air Force Academy) (ISSN 2169-7914), 26 (1), 2014: http://wlajournal.com/wlaarchive/26/Roy.pdf
