= Drummond Allison =

English World War II war poet (1921–1943)

John Drummond Allison
- Born: 1921; Caterham, Surrey
- Died: 2 December 1943 (aged 21-22); Monte Cassino, near the Garigliano River, Italy
- Burial place: Minturno War Cemetery, Italy
- Military career
- Allegiance: United Kingdom
- Branch: British Army
- Rank: Lieutenant
- Unit: East Surrey Regiment
- Conflicts: World War II: North African Campaign; Italian Campaign; Battle of Monte Cassino †

(John) Drummond Allison (1921 – 2 December 1943) was an English war poet of the Second World War.

He was born in Caterham, Surrey, and educated at Bishop's Stortford College and at Queen's College, Oxford. After training at the Royal Military College, Sandhurst, he became an intelligence officer in the East Surrey Regiment. He served in North Africa and Italy, where he was killed in action fighting on the Garigliano. Lieutenant Allison is buried in the Minturno War Cemetery.

== Works ==
- The Yellow Night: Poems 1940-41-42-43 (1944)
- The Poems of Drummond Allison (1978) edited by Michael Sharp
- The Collected Poems of Drummond Allison (1993) edited by Stephen Benson
