= David Wright (poet) =

South African-born author and poet

- David Wright, by Patrick Swift, c. 1960
- Born: 23 February 1920; Johannesburg, South Africa
- Died: 28 August 1994 (aged 74); Waldron, East Sussex, England
- Education: Oriel College, Oxford
- Occupation: Poet

David John Murray Wright (23 February 1920 – 28 August 1994) was a South African-born British author and poet, who was deaf from the age of seven.

== Early life and education ==
David John Murray Wright was born in Johannesburg, South Africa, on 23 February 1920 of normal hearing. When he was seven years old he contracted scarlet fever and became deaf as a result of the disease.

He immigrated to England at the age of 14, where he was enrolled in the Springfield School for the Deaf in Northampton and then studied at Oriel College, Oxford, and graduated in 1942.

== Career ==
Wright's first work, a poem entitled Eton Hall, was published in 1942–43 in the journal Oxford Poetry.

He became a freelance writer in 1947 after working on the Sunday Times newspaper for five years.

With John Heath-Stubbs he edited the Faber Book of Twentieth Century Verse. He edited the literary magazine Nimbus from 1955 to 1956, during which time he published 19 poems, sent to him by Patrick Swift, by Patrick Kavanagh, which proved to be the turning point in Kavanagh's career. He co-founded the quarterly literary review X magazine which he co-edited from 1959 to 1962.

His work includes three books about Portugal written with Patrick Swift, his co-founder and co-editor of X. He translated The Canterbury Tales and Beowulf into modern English. He held strong views about translating Beowulf, choosing to represent it in prose rather than modern verse under the banner "better no colours than faked ones", and criticising the versions of other poets.

He penned an autobiography in 1969, and a biography of fellow South African poet Roy Campbell in 1961. Wright also edited a number of publications throughout the 1960s and 1970s. He held the Gregory Fellowship in Poetry at the University of Leeds (1965–67).

Wright was not reticent about his deafness, and his autobiography, Deafness: A Personal Account (1969), is often used to give hearing people an insight into an experience they might not easily imagine.

== Personal life and death ==
In 1951, he married Philippa ("Pippa") Reid (d. 1985). He married Oonagh Swift in 1987.

Wright lived in Braithwaite, just outside Keswick, in the Lake District of England, and became good friends with Norman Nicholson, a fellow poet, and his wife.

Wright died of cancer in Waldron, East Sussex, on 28 August 1994.

== Critical reception ==
- "His poetry was by turns lyrical, satirical and narrative. Sometimes it was fuelled by recollections of his homeland, although he was not politically active on South African issues." – The New York Times)
- "profuse, fluent, versatile" and "the foremost South African poet of his generation." – The Daily Telegraph
- "It is a creative paradox that we owe to a deaf man some of the most striking images of sound in contemporary English poetry." – Geoffrey Hill, 1980
- "His poetry is remarkable for its quiet intelligence and humour, and the integrity of its style. The tone is conversational, though not in the sense of reproducing a factitious chattiness; rather, it creates the lively curve of an eminently humane mind's thinking and speaking" – T. J. G. Harris

== Published works ==
=== As poet ===
- Poems, Editions Poetry London (1947)
- Moral Stories (1954)
- Monologue of a Deaf Man (1958)
- Adam at Evening, Hodder & Stoughton (1965)
- Nerve Ends, Hodder & Stoughton (1969)
- To the Gods the Shades: New and Collected Poems, Carcanet New Press (1976)
- A view of the north, Carcanet Press (1976)
- A South African album, Cape Town: David Philip (1976)
- Metrical Observations, Carcanet (1980)
- Selected poems, Johannesburg : Ad. Donker (1980)
- Selected Poems, Carcanet Press (1988)
- Elegies, Greville (1990)
- Poems and Versions, Carcanet Press (1992)

=== As author ===
- Roy Campbell, The British Council/Longmans Green (1961)
- Deafness: A Personal Account, Faber & Faber (1969)

=== As co-author ===
- Algarve, A Portrait and a Guide London: Barrie & Rockliff (1965)
- Minho, A Portrait and a Guide, David Wright and Patrick Swift, London: Barrie & Rockliff (1968)
- Lisbon, A Portrait and a Guide, David Wright and Patrick Swift, London: Barrie & Rockliff (1971)

=== As translator ===
- Beowulf: A Prose Translation, Harmondsworth: Penguin Books (1957)
- The Canterbury Tales, London: Oxford University Press (1985)

=== As editor ===
- The Forsaken Garden: An Anthology of Poetry 1824–1909, edited by John Heath-Stubbs and David Wright (1950)
- Faber Book of Twentieth Century Verse, John Heath-Stubbs & David Wright (1953, 1965, 1975)
- South African Stories, Edited by D. Wright, Faber & Faber (1960)
- X, A Quarterly Review (Barrie and Rockliff, 1959–1962)
- The Mid-Century : English Poetry 1940–60 , David Wright (ed.), Penguin (1965)
- Longer Contemporary Poems, Harmondsworth: Penguin Books (1966)
- the Penguin Book of English Romantic Verse (1968)
- Seven Victorian Poets, edited with an introduction and commentary by David Wright, London: Heinemann Educational (1969)
- Recollections of the Lakes and the Lake poets / by Thomas de Quincey, edited with an introduction by David Wright, Harmondsworth : Penguin (1970).
- Records of Shelley, Byron, and the author, Edward John Trelawny, edited with an introduction by David Wright, Harmondsworth : Penguin (1973)
- the Penguin Book of Everyday Verse (1976)
- Selected poems : Thomas Hardy, edited with an introduction and notes by David Wright, Penguin (1978)
- Under the Greenwood Tree, Thomas Hardy, David Wright ed., Penguin Books (1979)
- Selected poems and prose / Edward Thomas, edited with an introduction by David Wright, Harmondsworth : Penguin (1981)
- An Anthology from X, Oxford University Press (1988)

=== About ===
- Written talk: David Wright in conversation with Anthony Astbury, London: Mailer Press (2006)
