= John Heath-Stubbs =

English poet and translator (1918–2006)

John Francis Alexander Heath-Stubbs (9 July 1918 – 26 December 2006) was an English poet and translator. He is known for verse influenced by classical myths, and for a long Arthurian poem, "Artorius" (1972).

== Biography and works ==
Heath-Stubbs was born in Streatham, London. The family later lived in Hampstead. His parents were Francis Heath-Stubbs, a non-practising, independently wealthy solicitor, and his wife Edith Louise Sara, a concert pianist under her maiden name, Edie Marr. His boyhood was largely spent near the New Forest.

The Stubbs family were gentry from Staffordshire; Heath-Stubbs's great-great-grandfather Joseph, a younger son, married Mary, the only child of a judge named Heath, this eventually becoming part of the family name. Heath-Stubbs stated in his autobiography Hindsights (1993), "In my grandfather's day, the last of the Heaths made us Stubbses her heirs, so long as we changed our name to Heath-Stubbs." Furthermore, "according to family tradition", they were related to the pamphleteer John Stubbs, who was sentenced to the loss of his right hand by Queen Elizabeth I for his opposition to negotiations for her marriage to Francis, Duke of Anjou, and yet remained a staunch royalist. "Family pride, combining with a poised self-irony" marked Heath-Stubbs's poem Epitaph, beginning, "Mr Heath-Stubbs as you must understand/Came of a gentleman's family out of Staffordshire/Of as good blood as any in England/But he was wall-eyed and his legs too spare."

Heath-Stubbs was educated at Bembridge School on the Isle of Wight and at the age of 21 entered Queen's College, Oxford, where he read English, finding the lectures of Nevill Coghill and C. S. Lewis particularly rewarding. He became a poetry adviser to the firm of Routledge, co-editing Eight Oxford Poets in 1941, with Sidney Keyes and Michael Meyer, and helping to edit Oxford Poetry in 1942–1943.

By that time Heath-Stubbs, had recognised his homosexuality, though his love for the poet and artist Philip Rawson was returned only in the form of strong friendship. In the early 1940s, Heath-Stubbs reverted to regular Anglican worship.

Heath-Stubbs held the Gregory Fellowship of Poetry at Leeds University in 1952–1955, followed by professorships in Alexandria, Egypt in 1955–1958 and Ann Arbor, Michigan in 1960–1961, and teaching posts at the College of St Mark and St John in Chelsea in 1962–1972, and at Merton College, Oxford for twenty years from 1972. He lived for a time, in the 1950s, at Zennor in Cornwall.

Heath-Stubbs's translations include work by Sappho, Horace, Catullus, Hafiz, Verlaine and Giacomo Leopardi. He was a central figure in British poetry in the early 1950s, editing, for example, the poetry anthology Images of Tomorrow (1953) and with David Wright the Faber Book of Twentieth Century Verse. He was elected to the RSL in 1954, awarded the Queen's Gold Medal for Poetry in 1973, and appointed OBE in 1989.

Although diagnosed with glaucoma at the age of 18, a condition he inherited from his father, he was able to read with his left eye until 1961, but was completely blind from 1978. Nonetheless, he continued to write almost to the end. A documentary film about him, entitled Ibycus: A Poem by John Heath-Stubbs, was made by the Chilean director Carlos Klein in 1997.

John Heath-Stubbs died in London on 26 December 2006, aged 88.

== Writing style ==
As a Romantic poet, Heath-Stubbs's diction was strong, yet subtle. Running through his work was a nostalgia for "classicism". He was consciously literary and his work elaborately wrought rather than spontaneous, which meant his was not the kind of poetry likely to have mass appeal. However, his devotion to the craft of poetry makes his work impressive. As Edward Lucie-Smith put it, "Few writers of his time had a deeper knowledge of the English language, or cared for it more devotedly."

== Poetry collections ==
- 1942: Wounded Thammuz
- 1943: Beauty and the Beast
- 1946: The Divided Ways
- 1946: Poems from Giacomo Leopardi
- 1948: The Swarming of the Bees
- 1948: Jonathan Swift: A Selection of Poems
- 1948: Selected Poems of Alfred Lord Tennyson
- 1948: Percy Bysshe Shelley- Poems
- 1949: The Charity of the Stars
- 1950: The Forsaken Garden: An Anthology of Poetry 1824–1909, edited with David Wright
- 1950: The Darkling Plain: Romanticism in English Poetry from Darley to Yeats
- 1950: Mountains Beneath the Horizon (ed.) poems by William Bell
- 1951: Aphrodite's Garland - Five Ancient Love Poems
- 1953: New Poems
- 1953: Images of Tomorrow: an Anthology of Recent Poetry
- 1953: Faber Book of Twentieth Century Verse, edited with David Wright
- 1954: A Charm Against the Toothache
- 1955: Charles Williams: Writers and Their Work No. 63
- 1958: The Triumph of the Muse and Other Poems
- 1958: Helen in Egypt and Other Plays
- 1962: The Blue-Fly in His Head
- 1965: Selected Poems
- 1968: Satires and Epigrams
- 1969: Cosmic Poem
- 1972: Penguin Modern Poets 20, co editor
- 1974: Artorius: A Heroic Poem in Four Books and Eight Episodes
- 1978: The Watchman's Flute
- 1978: Anyte with Carol Whiteside
- 1979: Omar Khayyám, The Rubaiyat, translated with Peter Avery
- 1981: In The Shadows - David Gray, editor
- 1981: Buzz Buzz - Ten Insect Poems (Illustrated by Richard Shirley Smith)
- 1982: Naming the Beasts
- 1985: The Immolation of Aleph
- 1987: Cat's Parnassus, Hearing Eye. ISBN 1-870841-00-X
- 1988: Collected Poems 1942–1987, Carcanet Press
- 1988: Time Pieces, Hearing Eye. ISBN 1-870841-02-6
- 1988: A Partridge in a Pear Tree: Poems for the Twelve Days of Christmas, Hearing Eye, illustrations by Emily Johns
- 1989: A Ninefold Of Charms, Hearing Eye, illustrations by Emily Johns
- 1990: Selected Poems
- 1992: The Parson's Cat, Hearing Eye, illustrations by Emily Johns
- 1993: Sweet-Apple Earth
- 1993: Hindsights : An Autobiography
- 1994: Chimaeras, Hearing Eye, lino etchings by Emily Johns
- 1996: Galileo's Salad
- 1998: The literary essays of John Heath-Stubbs, edited by A.T. Tolley
- 1999: The Sound of Light
- 2000: The Poems of Sulpicia, translator, Hearing Eye, illustrations by Emily Johns
- 2002: The Return of the Cranes
- 2005: Pigs Might Fly
