= George Barker (poet) =

English poet (1913–1991)

- George Barker, by Patrick Swift, c. 1960
- Born: 26 February 1913; Loughton, Essex, England
- Died: 27 October 1991 (aged 78); Itteringham, Norfolk, England
- Education: Regent Street Polytechnic
- Occupation: Poet

George Granville Barker (26 February 1913 – 27 October 1991) was an English poet. He identified with the New Apocalyptics movement, which reacted against 1930s realism with mythical and surrealistic themes. His long liaison with Elizabeth Smart was the subject of her novel By Grand Central Station I Sat Down and Wept.

== Life and work ==
George Barker was born on 26 February 1913 in Loughton, Essex, a stone's throw from Epping Forest. His father, George Barker (1879–1965), who had worn many hats from a temporary police constable to a butler at Gray's Inn, brought to the family a history of military service, having risen to the rank of Major during World War I. Marion Frances (1881–1953), née Taaffe, his mother, hailed from Mornington, County Meath. It was in Chelsea, London, at the age of six months, that Barker began his urban odyssey.

Barker's youth was spent in the company of his younger brother Kit, who would later make his mark as a painter. Their upbringing later in Battersea and subsequently at Upper Addison Gardens, Holland Park exposed them to a vibrant milieu that undeniably seeded Barker's poetic sensibilities.

His formal education began at an L.C.C. school and continued at Regent Street Polytechnic. However, the confines of structured learning could not contain Barker's burgeoning creative energy. Leaving school early, he meandered through various jobs before finding his true calling in poetry. His early works, including Thirty Preliminary Poems (1933), Poems (1935), and Calamiterror (1937)—the latter a fervent response to the Spanish Civil War and a scathing critique of the Spanish Nationalists. —heralded the arrival of a formidable literary talent.

The 1930s saw Barker's association with T. S. Eliot at Faber & Faber, a connection that proved pivotal. This endorsement led to his appointment as Professor of English Literature in 1939 at Tohoku University (Sendai, Miyagi, Japan). His time there, though cut short by the war, was artistically fruitful, giving birth to the Pacific Sonnets.

In his travel to the United States, his life intertwined dramatically with that of Elizabeth Smart. Their passionate and stormy affair produced four children and left an indelible mark on both their creative outputs. Concurrently, Barker fathered three children -- two of which were twins; Anthony and Anastasia -- with his first wife, Jessica. He returned to England in 1943. From the late 1960s until his death, Barker made his home in Itteringham, Norfolk, with his second wife, Elspeth Barker, herself a writer and journalist. This rural retreat provided the backdrop for his poem At Thurgarton Church (1969), inspired by the nearby village.

Barker's life was a mosaic of intense personal relationships and artistic fervour. His 1950 novel The Dead Seagull was a response to Smart's By Grand Central Station I Sat Down and Wept, which had revealed their affair. Robert Fraser edited Barker's Collected Poems (ISBN 0-571-13972-8) that were published in 1987 by Faber and Faber. Barker's alignment with the New Apocalyptics, a movement rebelling against the realism of the 1930s with surreal and mythic motifs, underscored his independence and distinctive voice.

Though his output varied in quality, Barker's literary landscape includes revered works like The True Confession of George Barker, hailed by C.H. Sisson as his masterpiece. Barker, ever self-aware, admitted the difficulty in capturing his life's tumultuous narrative, saying, "I've stirred the facts around too much... It simply can't be done." Yet, Robert Fraser's 2001 biography, The Chameleon Poet: A Life of George Barker, endeavours to trace the contours of his complex existence.

== Bibliography ==
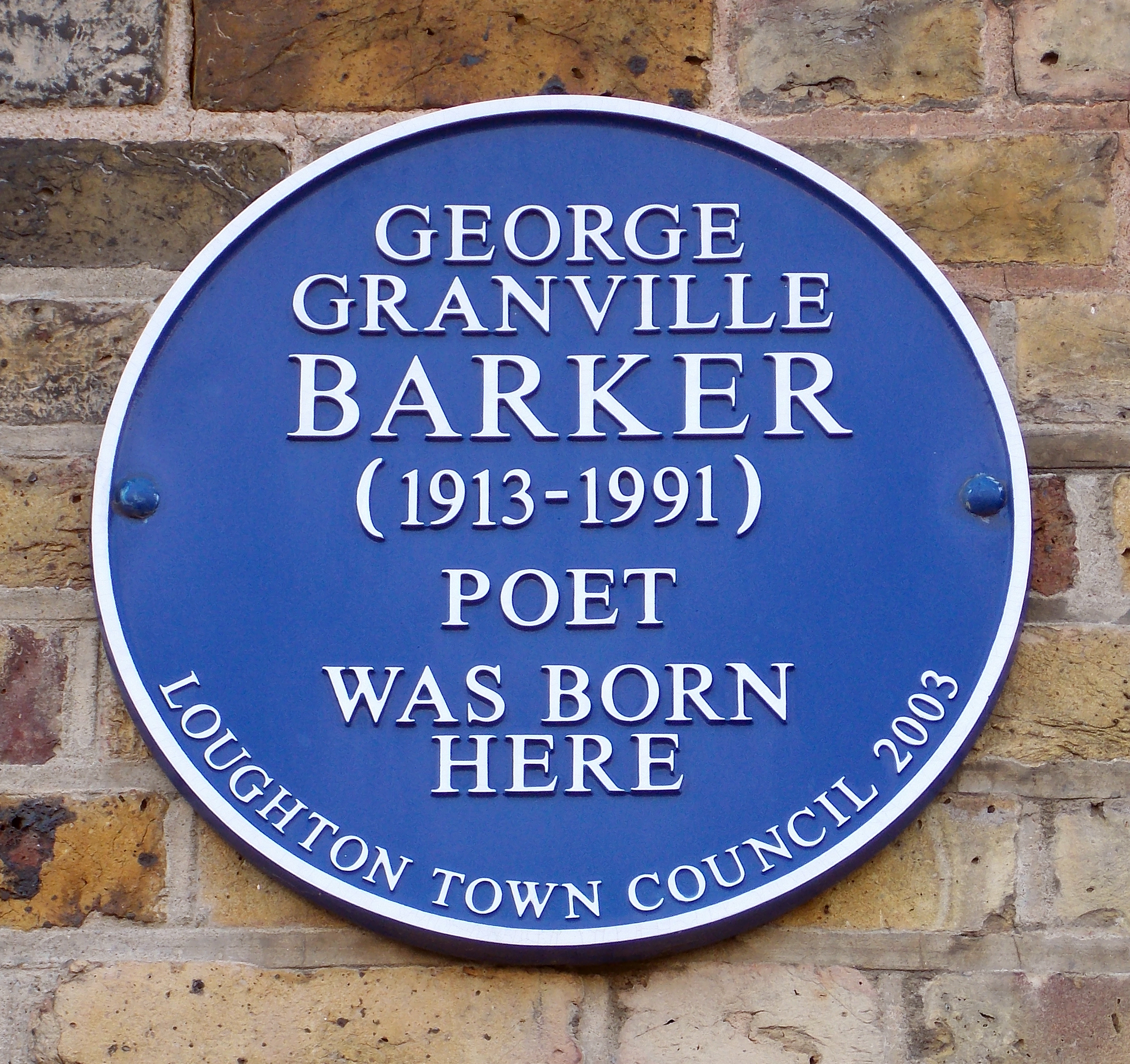
George Granville Barker blue plaque at Forest Road, Loughton

- Thirty Preliminary Poems, David Archer (1933)
- Alanna Autumnal, London : Wishart (1933)
- Poems, Faber & Faber (1935)
- Janus (The Documents of a Death.-The Bacchant.) [Two tales.], Faber & Faber (1935)
- Calamiterror, Faber & Faber (1937)
- Elegy on Spain, Manchester : Contemporary Bookshop (1939)
- Lament and Triumph, Faber & Faber (1940)
- Selected Poems, New York : Macmillan Co (1941)
- Eros in Dogma, Faber & Faber (1944)
- Love Poems, New York : Dial Press (1947)
- News of the world, Faber (1950)
- The Dead Seagull, Farrar, Straus & Young New York (1951)
- A vision of beasts and gods, Faber (1954)
- Collected Poems, 1930–1955. Faber & Faber (1957)
- The view from a blind I, Faber (1962)
- The True Confession of George Barker, MacGibbon & Kee (1965)
- Dreams of a summer night, Faber & Faber (1966)
- The golden chains, Faber (1968)
- At Thurgarton Church, A poem with drawings, etc., London : Trigram Press (1969).
- Runes and Rhymes, Tunes and Chimes, illustrated by George Adamson, Faber & Faber (1969)
- To Aylsham Fair, illustrated by George Adamson, Faber & Faber (1970)
- Essays, MacGibbon & Kee (1970)
- Poems of places and people, Faber and Faber (1971)
- III hallucination poems, New York City : Helikon Press (1972)
- The alphabetical zoo, Illustrated by Krystyna Roland, Faber and Faber (1972)
- Homage to George Barker on his sixtieth birthday, edited by John Heath-Stubbs and Martin Green, Martin Brian & O'Keeffe (1973)
- Dialogues etc., Faber (1976)
- Seven poems, Greville Press (1977)
- Villa Stellar Faber and Faber (1978)
- Anno Domini, Faber and Faber (1983)
- The Jubjub Bird or some Remarks on the Prose Poem, Greville Press, (1985)
- Collected Poems of George Barker, Faber and Faber, (1987)
- Mir Poets Thirteen: Three Poems, Word Press (1988)
- Seventeen, Greville Press, (1988)
- Street ballads, Faber & Faber (1992)
- Selected Poems, edited by Robert Fraser, Faber and Faber (1995)
- Dibby Dubby Dhu and other poems, illustrated by Sara Fanelli, Faber (1997)
- The Chameleon Poet: A Life of George Barker, Robert Fraser, Jonathan Cape Ltd (2002)
- Poems by George Barker, selected by Elspeth Barker, Greville Press (2004)
