= Oxford poetry anthologies =

Books published by Oxford University Press

The Oxford University Press published a long series of poetry anthologies, dealing in particular with British poetry but not restricted to it, after the success of the Oxford Book of English Verse (1900). The Oxford poetry anthologies ('Oxford Books') are traditionally seen as 'establishment' in attitude, and routinely therefore are subjects of discussion and contention. They have been edited both by well-known poets and by distinguished academics. In the limited perspective of canon-formation, they have mostly been retrospective and well-researched, rather than breaking fresh ground.

They include:

- New Oxford Book of English Verse 1250-1950 (1972) edited by Helen Gardner
- Oxford Book of Light Verse (1938) compiled by W. H. Auden
- The New Oxford Book of English Light Verse (1978) compilation and introduction by Kingsley Amis
- Oxford Anthology of English Poetry (1990) edited by John Wain
- Oxford Book of American Light Verse (1979) edited by William Harmon
- Oxford Book of English Verse (1999) edited by Christopher Ricks
- Oxford Book of Irish Verse (1958) edited by Donagh MacDonagh and Lennox Robinson
- New Oxford Book of Irish Verse (1986) edited by Thomas Kinsella
- Oxford Book of English Mystical Verse (1917) edited by Daniel Howard Sinclair Nicholson and Arthur Hugh Evelyn Lee.
- Oxford Book of Christian Verse (1940) edited by David Cecil.
- New Oxford Book of Christian Verse (1981) edited by Donald Davie.
- Oxford Book of Modern Verse 1892–1935 (1936) edited by W. B. Yeats
- Oxford Book of Twentieth Century English Verse (1973) edited by Philip Larkin
- Oxford Book of Contemporary Verse (1980) edited by D. J. Enright, reissued in 1995 as Oxford Book of Verse 1945-1980.
- Anthology of Twentieth-Century British and Irish Poetry (2001) edited by Keith Tuma.
- Oxford Book of Greek Verse (1930) edited by Gilbert Murray.
- Oxford Book of Latin Verse (1921) edited by H. W. Garrod.
- Oxford Book of Medieval Latin Verse (1928) edited by Stephen Gaselee.
- Oxford Book of French Verse (1907) edited by St. John Lucas.
- Oxford Book of German Verse (1927) edited by Hermann Georg Fiedler.
- The Oxford Book of Welsh Verse (1962), edited by Thomas Parry.
- The Oxford Book of Welsh Verse in English (1977), edited by Gwyn Jones.

See Oxford period poetry anthologies for selections by century, Oxford religious poetry anthologies.

== Oxford Book of Sonnets (2000) ==
Edited by John Fuller. The poets included were:

Thomas Wyatt - Henry Howard, Earl of Surrey - Giles Fletcher - Edmund Spenser - Walter Ralegh - Fulke Greville - Philip Sidney - Arthur Gorges - George Chapman - Henry Constable - Samuel Daniel - Michael Drayton - Joshua Sylvester - William Shakespeare - John Davies of Hereford - Thomas Campion - William Alabaster - Barnabe Barnes - John Davies - John Donne - Richard Barnfield - Lord Herbert of Cherbury - William Drummond - Mary Wroth - William Browne - George Herbert - Thomas Carew - William Habington - Edmund Waller - John Milton - Charles Cotton - Philip Ayres - Aphra Behn - Thomas Edwards - Thomas Gray - Thomas Warton - William Cowper - Anna Seward - Charlotte Turner Smith - John Bampfylde - Mary Robinson - William Lisle Bowles - Helen Maria Williams - Thomas Russell - William Wordsworth - Samuel Taylor Coleridge - Mary Tighe - Robert Southey - Charles Lamb - Walter Savage Landor - Ebenezer Elliott - James Henry Leigh Hunt - George Gordon, Lord Byron - John Keble - Percy Bysshe Shelley - John Clare - George Darley - John Keats - Hartley Coleridge - Thomas Hood - William Barnes - Thomas Lovell Beddoes - Elizabeth Barrett Browning - Henry Wadsworth Longfellow - John Greenleaf Whittier - Charles Tennyson Turner - Edgar Allan Poe - Alfred Tennyson, Lord Tennyson - William Bell Scott - Robert Browning - William Edmondstoune Aytoun - Arthur Hugh Clough - Frederick Goddard Tuckerman - Matthew Arnold - William Cory - William Allingham - Sydney Dobell - George Meredith - Dante Gabriel Rossetti - Christina Rossetti - Samuel Butler - John Leicester Warren - Algernon Charles Swinburne - Augusta Webster - Wilfrid Scawen Blunt - Thomas Hardy - Robert Buchanan - Edward Dowden - Robert Bridges - Ada Cambridge - Gerard Manley Hopkins - Louisa Sarah Bevington - Michael Field - Alice Meynell - Digby Mackworth Dolben - William Ernest Henley - Philip Bourke Marston - Robert Louis Stevenson - Oscar Wilde - Agnes Mary Frances Robinson - Francis Thompson - Mary Coleridge - Laurence Hope - Rudyard Kipling - Arthur Symons - William Butler Yeats - Edwin Arlington Robinson - Robert Frost - Edward Thomas - Siegfried Sassoon - Rupert Brooke - Elizabeth Daryush - Robinson Jeffers - Edwin Muir - John Crowe Ransom - Kenneth Leslie - Archibald MacLeish - Edna St. Vincent Millay - Wilfred Owen - Sylvia Townsend Warner - Aldous Huxley - Robert Graves - Charles Hamilton Sorley - Edgell Rickword - Roy Campbell - Kenneth Slessor - Merrill Moore - Patrick Kavanagh - Norman Cameron - William Empson - W. H. Auden - Alec Derwent Hope - Paul Engle - Malcolm Lowry - Roy Fuller - George Barker - Weldon Kees - Dylan Thomas - Gavin Ewart - Charles Causley - Robert Lowell - John Heath-Stubbs - William Meredith - Edwin Morgan - Richard Wilbur - Donald Davie - Philip Larkin - Louis Simpson - James Merrill - Richard Murphy - Peter Porter - Anthony Thwaite - Derek Walcott - Alan Brownjohn - Alistair Elliott - Geoffrey Hill - George MacBeth - Fleur Adcock - Seamus Heaney - Michael Longley - Derek Mahon - Douglas Dunn - Eavan Boland - Susan Wicks - Christopher Reid - Paul Muldoon - Jane Draycott - Carol Ann Duffy - Alan Jenkins - Jamie McKendrick - Simon Armitage - Alice Oswald

== Oxford Book of War Poetry (1984) ==
Edited by Jon Stallworthy. Poets and their translators included were:

Joseph Addison – Richard Aldington – Kenneth Allott – Aneirin – Guillaume Apollinaire – Louis Aragon – Matthew Arnold – Herbert Asquith – Margaret Atwood – W. H. Auden – William Edmonstoune Aytoun – Joel Barlow – O. Bernard – Sir John Betjeman – Laurence Binyon – John Peale Bishop – Edmund Blunden – William Lisle Bowles – Rupert Brooke – Robert Browning – George Gordon Noel, Lord Byron – Norman Cameron – Thomas Campbell – May Wedderburn Cannan – Charles Causley – Geoffrey Chaucer – G. K. Chesterton – Joseph P. Clancy – Samuel Taylor Coleridge – John Cornford – Stephen Crane – T. W. H. Crosland – Kevin Crossley-Holland – E. E. Cummings – R. N. Currey – Samuel Daniel – Elizabeth Daryush – Sir William Davenant – Donald Davie – C. Day-Lewis – Daniel Defoe – Paul Dehn – James Dickey – Emily Dickinson – John Donne – H.D. – Keith Douglas – Michael Drayton – John Dryden – Douglas Dunn – Richard Eberhart – T. S. Eliot – Ralph Waldo Emerson – Gavin Ewart – James Fenton – Robert Fitzgerald – Ephim Fogel – Carolyn Forché – Robert Frost – Roy Fuller – George Gascoigne – David Gascoyne – Allen Ginsberg – Robert Graves – Julian Grenfell – Thom Gunn – Ivor Gurney – Thomas Hardy – Seamus Heaney – Anthony Hecht – Geoffrey Hill – Homer – Horace – A. E. Housman – Henry Howard, Earl of Surrey – Julia Ward Howe – Ted Hughes – Victor Hugo – Randall Jarrell – Samuel Johnson – David Jones – Sidney Keyes – Galway Kinnell – Rudyard Kipling – Lincoln Kirstein – Stanley Kunitz – Philip Larkin – Laurie Lee – J. B. Leishman – Denise Levertov – Alun Lewis – Sir Richard Lovelace – James Russell Lowell – Robert Lowell – Thomas Babington, Lord Macaulay – George MacBeth – John McCrae – Hugh MacDiarmid – Archibald MacLeish – Louis MacNeice – Allen Mandelbaum – Andrew Marvell – Herman Melville – Robert Mezey – James Michie – Adam Mickiewicz – John Milton – Adrian Mitchell – Marianne Moore – Howard Nemerov – Sir Henry Newbolt – George Orwell – Wilfred Owen – George Peele – Benjamin Perét – Peter Porter – Ezra Pound – F. T. Prince – John Pudney – Herbert Read – Henry Reed – Edgell Rickword – Rihaku – Rainer Maria Rilke – Arthur Rimbaud – T. W. Rolleston – Isaac Rosenberg – Alan Ross – Charles Sackville – Carl Sandburg – Siegfried Sassoon – Dorothy L. Sayers – Vernon Scannell – John Scott – Karl Shapiro – Percy Bysshe Shelley – Simonides – Louis Simpson – Edith Sitwell – W. D. Snodgrass – Charles Sorley – Robert Southey – Bernard Spencer – Stephen Spender – Edmund Spenser – William Stafford – Jon Stallworthy – Wallace Stevens – Allen Tate – James Tate – Alfred, Lord Tennyson – William Makepeace Thackeray – Dylan Thomas – Edward Thomas – James Thomson – Charles Tomlinson – William Tyndale – Fyodor Tyutchev – Virgil – Andrei Voznesensky – Arthur Waley – Edgar Wallace – Sylvia Townsend Warner – Walt Whitman – Richard Wilbur – Charles Wolfe – William Wordsworth – W. B. Yeats

== Oxford Book of Short Poems (1985) ==
Edited by James Michie and P. J. Kavanagh. Poets included were:

Henry Aldrich - William Allingham - Drummond Allison - John Amner - Matthew Arnold - W. H. Auden - Philip Ayres - William Baldwin - George Barker - Jane Barker - Clement Barksdale - Richard Barnfield - Thomas Bastard - Francis Beaumont - Samuel Beckett - Thomas Lovell Beddoes - Thomas Beedome - Hilaire Belloc - Sir William Berkeley - John Berryman - John Betjeman - Elizabeth Bishop - Thomas Blackburn - William Blake - Edmund Blunden - Francis William Bourdillon - Anne Bradstreet - Robert Bridges - John Digby, Earl of Bristol - Emily Brontë - Elizabeth Barrett Browning - Robert Browning - John Bunyan - Robert Burns - George Gordon, Lord Byron - Norman Campbell - Roy Campbell - Thomas Campion - Thomas Carew - George Chapman - Thomas Chatterton - Geoffrey Chaucer - G. K. Chesterton - Richard Church - John Ciardi - Arthur Hugh Clough - Mary Coleridge - Samuel Taylor Coleridge - William Collins - William Congreve - Frances Cornford - William Johnson Cory - Francis Coutts - William Cowper - George Crabbe - Hart Crane - Stephen Crane - Richard Crashaw - Robert Creeley - John Crowne - E. E. Cummings - J. V. Cunningham - George Daniel - Sir William Davenant - John Davies of Hereford - W. H. Davies - C. Day-Lewis - Walter De La Mare - Sir John Denham - John Warren, Lord De Tabley - Emily Dickinson - Robert Dodsley - John Donne - Ernest Dowson - William Drummond of Hawthornden - John Dryden - Alan Dugan - Sir Edward Dyer - Clifford Dyment - Richard Eberhart - T. S. Eliot - Ralph Waldo Emerson - William Empson - D. J. Enright - Robert Devereux, Earl of Essex - Sir George Etherege - Gavin Ewart - Mildmay Fane, Earl of Westmorland - Sir Richard Fanshawe - Robert Fitzgerald - Thomas Fitzgerald - Thomas Flatman - James Elroy Flecker - Richard Flecknoe - John Fletcher - Phineas Fletcher - Ford Madox Ford - John Ford - Robert Francis - John Freeman - Robert Frost - Roy Fuller - John Gay - Oliver Goldsmith - Robert Graves - Thomas Gray - Fulke Greville - Ivor Gurney - John Hall - Thomas Hardy - Sir John Harington - Seamus Heaney - Robert Heath - Anthony Hecht - Edward, Lord Herbert of Cherbury - George Herbert - Robert Herrick - Thomas Heywood - Aaron Hill - Ralph Hodgson - A. D. Hope - Gerard Manley Hopkins - A. E. Housman - Ted Hughes - T. E. Hulme - Randall Jarrell - Robinson Jeffers - Elizabeth Jennings - Esther Johnson - Sir William Jones - Ben Jonson - Patrick Kavanagh - P. J. Kavanagh - John Keats - X. J. Kennedy - Henry King - Galway Kinnell - Rudyard Kipling - Mary Lamb - Walter Savage Landor - George Granville, Lord Landsdowne - Philip Larkin - D. H. Lawrence - Laurie Lee - Vachel Lindsay - Richard Lovelace - James Russell Lowell - Robert Lowell - Robert Bulwer-Lytton - Norman MacCaig - Hugh MacDiarmid - Patrick MacDonogh - Phyllis McGinley - Louis MacNeice - Derek Mahon - Edward May - Herman Melville - William Meredith - James Merrill - W. S. Merwin - Charlotte Mew - Alice Meynell - James Michie - Thomas Middleton - Edna St. Vincent Millay - John Milton - Adrian Mitchell - Lady Mary Wortley Montagu - James Graham, Marquis of Montrose - Marianne Moore - Thomas Moore - Thomas Nashe - Howard Nemerov - Margaret Cavendish, Duchess of Newcastle - William Cavendish, Duke of Newcastle - Norman Nicholson - Dudley, Lord North - Wilfred Owen - Edward de Vere, Earl of Oxford - Philip Pain - Coventry Patmore - William Pattison - Thomas Love Peacock - George Peele - Katherine Philips - Eden Phillpotts - Sylvia Plath - Alexander Pope - Ezra Pound - F. T. Prince - Matthew Prior - Francis Quarles - Sir Walter Ralegh - Thomas Randolph - John Crowe Ransom - James Reeves - Edwin Arlington Robinson - John Wilmot, Earl of Rochester - W. R. Rodgers - Theodore Roethke - Christina Rossetti - Dante Gabriel Rossetti - Samuel Rowlands - George William Russell - Thomas Rymer - Charles Sackville, Earl of Dorset - Carl Sandburg - Siegfried Sassoon - Sir Walter Scott - William Shakespeare - Percy Bysshe Shelley - William Shenstone - Sir Edward Sherburne - James Shirley - Sir Philip Sidney - James Simmons - C. H. Sisson - Edith Sitwell - John Skelton - Jonathan Smedley - Stevie Smith - William Jay Smith - Robert Southey - Muriel Spark - Sir John Squire - Sir Richard Steele - James Stephens - Wallace Stevens - Anne Stevenson - Robert Louis Stevenson - Trumbull Stickney - William Strode - Jonathan Swift - Arthur Symons - J. M. Synge - Nahum Tate - Alfred, Lord Tennyson - A. S. J. Tessimond - Dylan Thomas - Edward Thomas - R. S. Thomas - Francis Thompson - Henry Thoreau - Thomas Traherne - George Turbervile - John Updike - Mark Van Doren - Henry Vaughan - Edmund Waller - William Walsh - Vernon Watkins - Samuel Wesley - Walt Whitman - John Greenleaf Whittier - Anna Wickham - John Wigson - Richard Wilbur - Oscar Wilde - William Carlos Williams - Anne Finch, Countess of Winchilsea - William Wordsworth - Judith Wright - Sir Thomas Wyatt - Elinor Wylie - W. B. Yeats - Andrew Young
