= 1980 in poetry =

Nationality words link to articles with information on the nation's poetry or literature (for instance, Irish or France).

== Events ==
- Three new Hebrew literary journals appear this year in Israel: Mahbarot, edited by Y. Kenaz, Rosh a poetry journal edited by O. Bartena, and Hazerem hehadash, founded by a group of young ex-soldiers.
- Mark Jarman and Robert McDowell start the small magazine The Reaper to promote narrative and formal poetry.
- Conjunctions literary magazine gets its start one afternoon late this year when founding editor Bradford Morrow sits in Beat poet Kenneth Rexroth's library in Santa Barbara, California talking over the idea of assembling a publication to celebrate James Laughlin, editor of New Directions Publishing. Poets solicited for the publication promise to send in work for future issues of the magazine, not realizing that no magazine is planned at this stage. Morrow then starts the magazine, financing the first few issues himself.
- December 19 – Guatemalan poet Alaíde Foppa is abducted and never seen again.

== Works published in English ==
Listed by nation where the work was first published and again by the poet's native land, if different; substantially revised works listed separately:

=== Canada ===
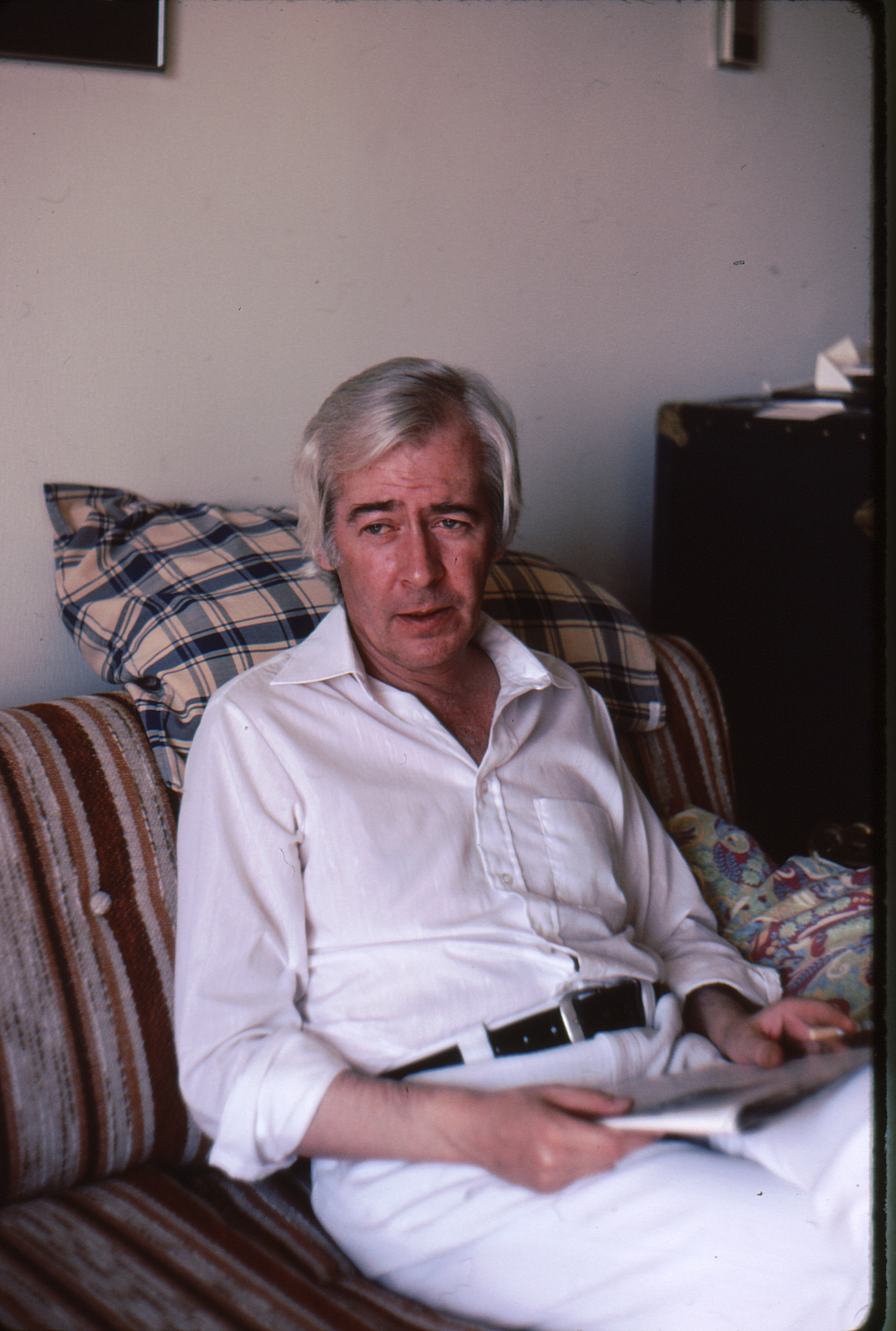
Canadian poet John Newlove in June of this year

- Roo Borson (American-Canadian):
  - In the Smoky Light of the Fields, ISBN 0-88823-024-9
  - Rain, ISBN 0-920806-19-8
- Fred Cogswell, A Long Apprenticeship
- Louis Dudek, Cross-Section: Poems 1940-1980. Toronto: Coach House Press.
- Dorothy Farmiloe, Words for My Weeping Daughter
- Robert Finch, Variations and Theme.
- Gail Fox, In Search of Living Things
- Ralph Gustafson, Landscape with Rain
- Irving Layton, For My Neighbours in Hell. Oakville, Ontario: Mosaic Press.
- Miriam Mandel, Where Have You Been?. Edmonton: Longspoon Press.
- Joe Rosenblatt, The Sleeping Lady. Exile Editions.
- Raymond Souster, Collected Poems, Volume 1 (1940-55) (first of a projected ten-volume collection)
- Raymond Souster and Richard Woollatt, eds. Poems of a Snow-Eyed Country. Don Mills, ON: Academic Press.
- Andrew Suknaski, Montage for an Interstellar Cry
- Anne Szumigalski, A Game of Angels
- Tom Wayman, Living on the Ground: Tom Wayman Country, including "Garrison", first prize-winner of the U.S. Bicentennial poetry competition
- Phyllis Webb, Wilson's Bowl

=== Caribbean ===
- A. J. Seymour, A Treasury of Guyanese Poetry
- Pamela Mordecai, Mervyn Morris, editors, Jamaica Woman: An Anthology of Poems, Publisher: Heinemann Educational Books
- Lorna Goodison, Tamarind Season
- Mutabaruka, The First Poems: 1970–1979
- Derek Walcott, The Star-Apple Kingdom, St. Lucia native living in and published in the United States

=== India, in English ===
- Meena Alexander, Stone Roots ( Poetry in English ), New Delhi: Arnold Heinemann, by an Indian writing and living in the United States
- Dilip Chitre, Travelling In A Cage ( Poetry in English ), Mumbai:Clearing House
- Keki Daruwalla:
  - Editor, Two Decades of Indian Poetry 1960-1980, Delhi: Vikas
  - Winter Poems ( Poetry in English ), New Delhi: Allied Publishers Pvt Ltd.
- E. V. Ramakrishnan:
  - A Python in A Snake Park ( Poetry in English ), New Delhi: Rupa and Co. ISBN 81-7167-194-2
  - Being Elsewhere in Myself ( Poetry in English ), Kolkata: Writers Workshop, India.
- Jayanta Mahapatra, The False Start (Poetry in English), Bombay: Clearing House, India .

=== Ireland ===
- Eavan Boland, In Her Own Image, Irish poet published in the United Kingdom
- Dermot Bolger, The Habit of Flesh
- Seamus Heaney, Selected Poems 1965-1975, Faber & Faber, Northern Ireland native published in the United Kingdom
- Thomas Kinsella, Poems 1956–1973, Irish poet published in the United Kingdom
- Paul Muldoon, Why Brownlee Left Northern Ireland native published in the United Kingdom
- Tom Paulin, The Strange Museum, including "Pot Burial" and "Where Art Is a Midwife", Faber and Faber, Irish poet published in the United Kingdom

=== New Zealand ===
- James K. Baxter, Collected Poems, posthumous
- Charles Brasch, Indirections: a Memoir, 1909-1947, Wellington; New York: Oxford University Press, autobiography
- Alistair Campbell, The Dark Lord of Savaiki: Collected Poems, Christchurch: Hazard Press
- Lauris Edmond:
  - Wellington Letter: A Sequence of Poems
  - Seven: Poems
  - Salt from the North
- W. H. Oliver, Out of Season: Poems, Wellington; New York: Oxford University Press, New Zealand
- Alistair Patterson, editor, Fifteen Contemporary New Zealand Poets, anthology
- Ian Wedde, Castaly: Poems 1973–1977

=== United Kingdom ===
- Eavan Boland, In Her Own Image, Irish poet published in the United Kingdom
- Alan Brownjohn, A Night in the Gazebo
- David Constantine, A Brightness to Cast Shadows
- Wendy Cope, Across the City
- Donald Davie, In the Stopping Train, and Other Poems
- Lawrence Durrell, Collected Poems: 1931–1974, edited by James A. Brigham
- Gavin Ewart, The Collected Ewart 1933–1980 (see also Collected Poems 1990)
- Elaine Feinstein, The Feast of Eurydice, Faber & Faber/Next Editions
- James Fenton, A German Requiem: A Poem, Salamander Press, a pamphlet
- Roy Fisher, Poems 1955–1980
- John Fuller, The January Divan
- Roy Fuller, The Reign of Sparrows
- Geoffrey Grigson, History of Him
- Seamus Heaney, Selected Poems 1965–1975 (see also New Selected Poems 1990), Northern Ireland native published in the United Kingdom
- Adrian Henri, From the Loveless Matel
- Frances Horovitz, Water Over Stone
- Elizabeth Jennings, A Dream of Spring
- Linton Kwesi Johnson, Inglan is a Bitch
- Thomas Kinsella, Poems 1956–1973, Irish poet published in the United Kingdom
- Laurence Lerner, A.R.T.H.U.R. & M.A.R.T.H.A.; or, The Loves of the Computers, South African native living and published in the United Kingdom
- George MacBeth, Poems of Love and Death
- Norman MacCaig, The Equal Skies
- Pete Morgan, One Greek Alphabet
- Paul Muldoon, Why Brownlee Left, Northern Ireland native published in the United Kingdom
- Tom Paulin, The Strange Museum, Northern Ireland native published in the United Kingdom
- Kathleen Raine, The Oracle in the Heart, and Other Poems 1975–1978
- Jeremy Reed, Bleecker Street
- Jon Silkin, The Psalms With Their Spoils
- Anthony Thwaite, Victorian Voices
- John Wain, Poems, 1949–1979
- Benjamin Zephaniah, Pen Rhythm, his first published collection

==== Anthologies in the United Kingdom ====
- D. J. Enright, editor, The Oxford Book of Contemporary Verse (see above)
- Blake Morrison, editor, The Movement
- Charles Tomlinson, editor, The Oxford Book of Verse in English translation
- Geoffrey Grigson, editor, Oxford Book of Satirical Verse
- Gavin Ewart, editor, Penguin Book of Light Verse
- Valentine Cunningham, editor, Penguin Book of Spanish Civil War Verse

=== United States ===
- Meena Alexander, Stone Roots, New Delhi: Arnold Heinemann, by an Indian writing and living in the United States
- A.R. Ammons, Selected Longer Poems
- Ted Berrigan:
  - So Going Around Cities: New & Selected Poems (ISBN 0-912652-61-6)
  - Carrying a Torch
- Elizabeth Bishop, That was Then, published posthumously (died 1979)
- Philip Booth, Before Sleep
- Joseph Brodsky: A Part of Speech, New York: Farrar, Straus & Giroux Russian-American
- Lucille Clifton, Two-Headed Woman
- George F. Butterick and Richard Blevins, editors, Charles Olson and Robert Creeley: The Complete Correspondence, first volume published this year (ninth and last volume published in 1990), Santa Barbara, California
- Billy Collins, Video Poems
- Allen Ginsberg, Straight Hearts' Delight: Love Poems and Selected Letters, 1947–1980
- Daniel G. Hoffman, Brotherly Love
- Galway Kinnell, Mortal Acts, Mortal Words
- James McMichael, Four Good Things
- William Meredith, The Cheer
- James Merrill, Scripts for the Pageant
- Howard Nemerov, Sentences
- Molly Peacock, And Live Apart
- James Schuyler, The Morning of the Poem
- Frederick Seidel, Sunrise
- Louis Simpson, Caviare at the Funeral
- Mark Strand, Selected Poems, Canadian native living in and published in the United States
- Derek Walcott, The Star-Apple Kingdom, St. Lucia native living in and published in the United States
- Rosmarie Waldrop, When They Have Senses (Burning Deck Press)
- Robert Penn Warren, Being Here: Poetry 1977–1980
- Philip Whalen, Enough Said (Grey Fox Press)
- Ray Young Bear, winter of the salamander (sic)

==== Criticism, scholarship and biography in the United States ====
- Justin Kaplan, Walt Whitman (biography)
- Lew Welch, I Remain (letters; Grey Fox Press), posthumous

=== Other in English ===
- Lorna Goodison, Tamarind Season, Jamaica
- Philip Salom, The Silent Piano (Fremantle Arts Centre) ISBN 978-0-909144-31-9, Australia
- Chris Wallace-Crabbe, editor, The Golden Apples of the Sun: Twentieth Century Australian Poetry, Melbourne: Melbourne University Press, anthology

== Works published in other languages ==
Listed by language and often by nation where the work was first published and again by the poet's native land, if different; substantially revised works listed separately:

=== Denmark ===
- Klaus Høeck, Denmark:
  - Bowie, Bowie, with Asger Schnack, publisher: Gyldendal
  - Eno One, with Asger Schnack, publisher: Albatros
  - Nul (med Asger Schnack og F.P.Jac), publisher: Sommersko
  - Renaldo & Clara (med Asger Schnack), publisher: Virkelyst
- Klaus Rifbjerg, Livsfrisen

=== French language ===
==== Canada, in French ====
- Suzanne Jacob, Poèmes I : Gémellaires, Montréal: Le Biocreux
- Pierre Nepveu, Couleur chair, Montréal: l'Hexagone
- Edmond Robillard, Le temps d'un peu ... : Poèmes, Montréal: Éditions Albert-le-Grand
- Jean Royer, Faim souveraine, l'Hexagone

==== France ====
- Yves Bonnefoy, Entretiens sur la poésie, France
- Philippe Denis:
  - Carnet d'un aveuglement
  - Surface d'écueil
- Emmanuel Hocquard, Une journée dans le détroit
- Edmond Jabès, L'Ineffacable L'Inaperçu
- Abdellatif Laabi, Moroccan author writing in and published in France:
  - Le Règne de barbarie. Seuil, Paris (épuisé)
  - Histoire des sept crucifiés de l'espoir. La Table rase, Paris
- Jean Max Tixier, editor, Vers une logoqie poétique, publisher: La Table Rase

=== Germany ===
==== West Germany ====
- Christoph Buchwald, general editor, and Christoph Meckel, Jahrbuch der Lyrik 2 ("Poetry Yearbook 2"), publisher: Claassen; anthology
- Ernst Jandl, Der gelbe Hund
- Johanna Moosdorf, Sieben Jahr sieben Tag
- W. Schubert and K. H. Höfer, editors, Ansichten über Lyrik, anthology, poems and prose since Opitz

==== East German exiles ====
- Roger Loewig, Ein Vogel bin ich ohne Flügel
- Thomas Brasch, Der Schöne 27. September
- Günter Kunert, Abtötungsverfahren

=== Hebrew ===
- Natan Sach, Tsfonit misrahit
- Dan Pagis, editor, an anthology of medieval Hebrew love poetry
- Mavet ve' ahava, an anthology of Egyptian poetry in Hebrew translation

=== India ===
Listed in alphabetical order by first name:

- Gulzar, Kuch Aur Nazme, New Delhi: Radhakrishna Prakashan; Hindi-language
- Kedarnath Singh, Zameen Pak Rahi Hai, Delhi: Prakashan Sansthan; Hindi
- M. Gopalakrishna Adiga, Mulaka Mahasayaru, India, Kannada-language
- Nilmani Phookan, Kavita, Guwahati, Assam: Barua Book Agency, Assamese-language
- Rajendra Kishore Panda, Nija Pain Nanabaya, Samabesha, Bhubaneswar: Prakashani, Oraya-language
- Panna Nayak, Philadelphia; Gujarati-language
- Prabhu Chugani, Surkh Gulab Suraha, a collection of five-line poems in a form invented by him; the book received the Sahitya Akademi Award in 1981, Indian, Sindhi-language

=== Italian ===
- Piero Bigongiari, Moses
- Valerio Magrelli, Ora serrata retinae
- Eugenio Montale, L'opera in versi, the Bettarini-Contini edition (published in 1981 as Altri verse e poesie disperse), publisher: Mondadori; Italy
- Edoardo Sanguineti, Stracciafoglio
- Antonio Porta, Passi passaggi
- Maurizio Cucchi, Le meraviglie dell'acqua
- Ugo Reale, Il cerchio d'ombra

=== Norway ===
- Ernst Orvil, Nær nok (Norwegian)
- Harald Sverdrup, Fugleskremsel (Norwegian)
- Marie Takvam, Falle og reise seg att (Norwegian)

=== Poland ===
- Stanisław Barańczak, Tryptyk z betonu, zmeczenia i sniegu ("Triptych with Concrete, Fatigue and Snow"), Kraków: KOS
- M. Korolko, editor, Średniowieczna pieśn religina polska, second edition, anthology
- A. Lam, editor, Ze struny na strune, anthology
- Bronisław Maj, Wiersze ("Poems"); Warsaw: NOWA
- Piotr Sommer, Pamiątki po nas
- Jan Twardowski, Niebieskie okulary ("Blue Sunglasses"), Kraków: Znak

=== Portuguese language ===
==== Portugal ====
- Mário Cláudio, Estáncias
- Mário Cesariny de Vasconcelos, Primavera Autónomia das Estradas

==== Brazilian ====
- Carlos Drummond de Andrade, Esquecer para lembrar (the third volume of his poetic autobiography)
- Mário Chamie
- Astrid Cabral
- Liane dos Santos
- Tarik de Sousa
- Dante de Milano, complete poems
- Paulo Mendes Campos, complete poems
- Afonso Félix de Sousa, book of poems

=== Russia ===
- Aleksandr Blok (1880–1921), much of his poetry was republished in this year, his centenary, including a six-volume edition of his collected works and Blok in the Reminiscences of Contemporaries

=== Spanish language ===
==== Spain ====
- Matilde Camus, Perfiles ("Profiles")
- Antonio Colinas, Astrolabio
- Leopoldo Azancot, La novia judia

==== Sweden ====
- Lars Forssell, Stenar
- Ylva Eggehorn, Hjärtats Knytnãvsslag
- Tobias Berggren, Threnos
- Begt Emil Johnson, Vinterminne

=== Other languages ===
- Leyzer Aichenrand, Landscape of Fate, Yiddish in Switzerland
- Samih al-Qasim, Je t'aime au gré de la mort, Palestinian
- Simin Behbahani, Khatti ze Sor'at va Atash ("A Line of Speed and Fire"), Persia
- Mairtin O Direain, Danta, including "Deiradh Re", "Cuimhne an Domhnaigh", and "Cranna Foirtil", Gaelic-language, Ireland

== Awards and honors ==
- Nobel Prize in Literature: Czesław Miłosz, Polish poet, translator, literary critic, and (since 1951) exile.

=== Australia ===
- Kenneth Slessor Prize for Poetry: David Campbell, Man in the Honeysuckle

=== Canada ===
- See 1980 Governor General's Awards for a complete list of winners and finalists for those awards.
- Prix Émile-Nelligan: Claude Beausoleil, Au milieu du corps l’attraction s’insinue (poèmes 1975-1980)

=== United Kingdom ===
- Cholmondeley Award: George Barker, Terence Tiller, Roy Fuller
- Eric Gregory Award: Robert Minhinnick, Michael Hulse, Blake Morrison, Medbh McGuckian

=== United States ===
- Academy of American Poets Fellowship: Mona Van Duyn
- AML Award for Poetry to Emma Lou Thayne for "Once in Israel"
- Pulitzer Prize for Poetry: Donald Justice, Selected Poems (April 14)
- Rhysling Award:
  - Andrew Joron, The Sonic Flowerfall of Primes (Long Form)
  - Peter Payack, The Migration of Darkness (Short Form, tie)
  - Robert Frazier, Encased in the Amber of Eternity (Short Form, tie)
- American Academy of Arts and Letters: John Ashbery elected a member of the Literature Department
- Fellowship of the Academy of American Poets: Mona Van Duyn
- Walt Whitman Award of the Academy of American Poets: Jared Carter

=== Spanish ===
- Premios de la Crítica awards in poetry:
  - Castilian: Luis Rosales, Diario de una resurrección
  - Catalan: Miquel Martí i Pol, Estimada Marta
  - Galician: Eduardo Moreiras, O libro dos mortos
  - Basque: Juan Mari Lekuona, Ilargiaren eskolan

== Deaths ==
Birth years link to the corresponding "[year] in poetry" article:

- January 3 – George Sutherland Fraser (born 1915), Scottish poet and critic
- February 12 – Muriel Rukeyser, 66 (born 1913), American, of a heart attack
- February 25 – Robert Hayden, 66, American poet, essayist, and educator, of a heart ailment
- March 25 – James Wright, 52, American, of cancer
- March 31 – Vladimir Holan, 74, Czech
- April 21 – Sohrab Sepehri (born 1928), Persian poet and painter
- April 30 – Luis Muñoz Marín (born 1898), Puerto Rican poet, journalist and politician
- June 20 – Amy Key Clarke (born 1892), English mystical poet
- July 9 – Vinicius de Moraes (born 1913), Brazilian writer, poet and diplomat
- July 25 – Vladimir Vysotsky (born 1938), Russian singer-songwriter, poet and actor
- August 9 – Denis Glover (born 1911), New Zealand poet and publisher
- September 2 – Frederick T. Macartney (born 1887), Australian
- September 25 – Marie Under (born 1883), Estonian
- October 18 – Martin Haley (born 1905), Australian poet, essayist, translator and schoolteacher
- October 25 – Sahir Ludhianvi (born 1921), Urdu/Hindustani poet and Hindi film lyricist
- November 21 – A. J. M. Smith (born 1902), Canadian
- November 28 – Julia Reynolds, 98

== See also ==
- Poetry
- List of years in poetry
- List of poetry awards

== Notes ==
- Britannica Book of the Year 1980 ("for events of 1979"), published by Encyclopædia Britannica 1980 (source of many items in "Works published" section and rarely in other sections)
