= Fantasy Press (poetry) =

The Fantasy Press was an English publisher of poetry between 1951 and 1962, allied to the Oxford University Poetry Society and superintended by the painter and illustrator Oscar Mellor. As well as publishing a regular series of pamphlets by undergraduate and graduate poets between 1952 and 1957, it also brought out longer collections by some, as well as anthologies of university poetry containing their work.

== A local stimulus ==
The firm was established by Oscar Mellor in Swinford, Oxfordshire, primarily to finance his work as an artist, but gained a high-profile through publishing a series of poets who became major figures of The Movement and The Group - as well as others who went on to make their name in the US, such as Donald Hall, Adrienne Rich, Richard Selig and George Steiner. English Poets who had early works published by the Fantasy Press included Elizabeth Jennings, Thom Gunn, Philip Larkin, and Geoffrey Hill.

As well as those who made a short first appearance in the Fantasy Poets series, some proceeded to publish more substantial collections from the press. These included Thom Gunn's original "Fighting Terms" (1954); two by George MacBeth ("A Form of Words", 1954, and "Lecture to the Trainees", 1962); Charles Tomlinson (the original "The Necklace", 1955); Gordon Wharton, ("This and That", 1955); Donald Davie ("The Brides of Reason", 1955); Lucien Stryk, ("The Trespasser", 1956); Kingsley Amis ("The Evans Country", 1962); Peter Dale, ("A Walk from the House", 1962); Michael Fried, ("Other Hands, 1962").

Up until 1953, the Basil Blackwell imprint had been the chief recourse for university poets and had published annual Oxford Poetry anthologies until 1953, when Fantasy Press took the project over. Work in the successive anthologies was the choice of students from the Oxford University Poetry Society, who were also made aware at this time of the poetry being written by their Cambridge contemporaries. Another Fantasy Press venture of this period, for example, Poetry from Cambridge 1952-4, contained early work by Ted Hughes and by Gunn.

== Fantasy Poets series ==
This was a numbered series of 35 booklets published by the press between 1952 and 1957. Each was in octavo format, card-wrapped and centre-stapled, containing a small eight-page selection of poems by an individual poet. Some 300 copies of each were printed.

- 1. Elizabeth Jennings (1952)
- 2. Pearce Young
- 3. James Price
- 4. Donald Hall
- 5. Simon Broadbent
- 6. Peter Dale Scott
- 7. Paul West
- 8. F. George Steiner
- 9. Lotte Zurndorfer
- 10. Martin Seymour-Smith
- 11. Geoffrey Hill
- 12. Adrienne Cecile Rich
- 13. Michael Shanks
- 14. Michael Raper
- 15. A. Alvarez
- 16. Thom Gunn (1954)
- 17. Anthony Thwaite (1953)
- 18. Arthur Boyars
- 19. Donald Davie
- 20. Jonathan Price (1954)
- 21. Philip Larkin (1954)
- 22. Kingsley Amis
- 23. Richard Selig (1954)
- 24. Adrian Mitchell (1954)
- 25. Edward Lucie-Smith (1954)
- 26. John Holloway (1954)
- 27. Richard Drain (1955)
- 28. Laurence D. Lerner (1955)
- 29. Daibhidh Michell (1955)
- 30. H.S. Eveling
- 31. Mark Holloway (1956)
- 32. Richard Aldridge (1956)
- 33. Kenneth Wood (1956)
- 34. Dennis Keene (1957)
- 35. Richard Kell (1957)
