= Oxford religious poetry anthologies =

Several anthologies of religious poetry have been published by Oxford University Press.

== Oxford Book of English Mystical Verse (1917) ==
The Oxford Book of English Mystical Verse was a poetry anthology edited by Daniel Howard Sinclair Nicholson and Arthur Hugh Evelyn Lee, and published in 1917 by the Oxford University Press. The compilation contains much religious verse, mainly from English Christian traditions, and some from other religions.

Present are poems by A. E. Waite and the young Aleister Crowley. Lee, an Anglican clergyman, associated with Waite. Nicholson later published a work on mysticism and St. Francis of Assisi. They both joined the Hermetic Order of the Golden Dawn, Lee in 1908, and Nicholson in 1910; both were friends of Charles Williams.

Eclecticism is shown by the presence of: Alfred Gurney, a clerical friend of Christina Rossetti; Edward Carpenter, Fabian socialist and homosexual; Frederic W. H. Myers, academic and psychic researcher; John Addington Symonds, aesthete; Walter Leslie Wilmshurst, writer on freemasonry and Wagner; Darrell Figgis, better known as a novelist and Sinn Féin member; George Santayana, the philosopher; Fred G. Bowles who was a Tin Pan Alley lyricist.

The poets included in The Oxford Book of English Mystical Verse were:

- Lascelles Abercrombie
- William Alexander
- Edwin Arnold
- Matthew Arnold
- Philip James Bailey
- Elsa Barker
- George Barlow
- Clifford Bax
- Henry Charles Beeching
- Arthur Christopher Benson
- John Stuart Blackie
- Francis William Bourdillon
- Fred G. Bowles
- Emily Brontë
- Thomas Edward Brown
- Elizabeth Barrett Browning
- Robert Browning
- Robert Buchanan
- Alice Mary Bunston
- John Byrom
- Bliss Carman
- Edward Carpenter
- Henry Bernard Carpenter
- Edward Caswall
- Madison Julius Cawein
- Nora Chesson
- G. K. Chesterton
- Wilfred Rowland Childe
- Amy Clarke
- Ellen Mary Clerke
- Mary Elizabeth Coleridge
- Samuel Taylor Coleridge
- Henry Constable
- James H. Cousins
- William Cowper
- Dinah Maria (Mulock) Craik
- Christopher Pearse Cranch
- Richard Crashaw
- Arthur Shearly Cripps
- Aleister Crowley
- Victor James Daley
- Thom Davies
- William James Dawson
- Margaret Deland
- Aubrey Thomas De Vere
- Ella Dietz
- Richard Watson Dixon
- Digby Mackworth Dolben
- John Donne
- Edward Dowden
- Augusta Theodosia Drane
- Agnes Mary Frances Duclaux
- John Charles Earle
- Edwin J. Ellis
- Ralph Waldo Emerson
- Frederick William Faber
- Michael Field
- Darrell Figgis
- Phineas Fletcher
- Christina Catherine Fraser-Tytler
- Harold E. Goad
- Eva Gore-Booth
- Edmund Gosse
- John Gray
- Dora Greenwell
- Alfred Gurney
- Christopher Harvey
- Frances Ridley Havergal
- Robert Stephen Hawker
- William Ernest Henley
- George Herbert
- Robert Herrick
- Emily Henrietta Hickey
- Kathleen Tynan Hinkson
- Horace Holley
- Edmond Gore Alexander Holmes
- Paul Hookham
- Gerard Manley Hopkins
- Gertrude M. Hort
- Lord Houghton
- Laurence Housman
- Jean Ingelow
- Harriet Eleanor Hamilton King
- Archibald Lampman
- Richard Le Gallienne
- Ruth Temple Lindsay
- Alfred Comyn Lyall
- George MacDonald
- James Clarence Mangan
- Andrew Marvell
- John Masefield
- Eugene Mason
- George Meredith
- Alice Meynell
- Richard Monckton Milnes
- Susan Mitchell
- Harold Monro
- Lewis Morris
- John Spencer Muirhead
- Frederic W. H. Myers
- Sarojini Nayadu
- Henry Newbolt
- John Henry Newman
- Roden Noel
- Alfred Noyes
- Arthur William Edgar O'Shaughnessy
- Henry Nutcombe Oxenham
- John Oxenham
- Francis Turner Palgrave
- Coventry Patmore
- Joseph Mary Plunkett
- Edgar Allan Poe
- Alexander Pope
- May Probyn
- Francis Quarles
- James Rhoades
- James Rennell Rodd
- Richard Rolle
- Christina Rossetti
- Dante Gabriel Rossetti
- George William Russell (A. E.)
- George Santayana
- William Bell Scott
- William Sharp
- Percy Bysshe Shelley
- R. A. Eric Shepherd
- Dora Sigerson Shorter
- Robert Southwell
- James Stephens
- Algernon Charles Swinburne
- Joshua Sylvester
- John Addington Symonds
- Arthur Symons
- John Bannister Tabb
- Rachel Annand Taylor
- Alfred Tennyson
- Edith Matilda Thomas
- Francis Thompson
- Thomas Traherne
- Herbert Trench
- Richard Chenevix Trench
- Evelyn Underhill
- Henry Vaughan
- C. M. Verschoyle
- Samuel Waddington
- Arthur Edward Waite
- Clarence A. Walworth
- Frederick William Orde Ward
- David Atwood Wasson
- Isaac Watts
- Charles Weekes
- Walt Whitman
- Oscar Wilde
- Sarah Williams
- Walter Leslie Wilmshurst
- William Wordsworth
- W. B. Yeats

== Oxford Book of Christian Verse (1940) ==
Edited by Lord David Cecil. Poets included were:

- Joseph Addison
- Matthew Arnold
- John Austin
- William Baldwin
- Barnabe Barnes
- William Barnes
- Richard Baxter
- Joseph Beaumont
- Joseph Hilaire Belloc
- William Blake
- Edmund Bolton
- Horatius Bonar
- Katherine Bradley
- Robert Bridges
- Sir Thomas Browne
- Elizabeth Barrett Browning
- Robert Browning
- Robert Williams Buchanan
- John Bunyan
- John Byrom
- Thomas Campion
- Patrick Carey
- Margaret Cavendish, Duchess of Newcastle
- Geoffrey Chaucer
- G. K. Chesterton
- John Clare
- Mary Elizabeth Coleridge
- Samuel Taylor Coleridge
- Henry Constable
- Edith Cooper
- Abraham Cowley
- William Cowper
- George Crabbe
- Richard Crashaw
- Samuel Crossman
- Sir John Davies
- Richard Watson Dixon
- Philip Doddridge
- Digby Mackworth Dolben
- John Donne
- Gavin Douglas
- William Drummond of Hawthornden
- John Dryden
- William Dunbar
- T. S. Eliot
- Michael Field
- Giles Fletcher
- Phineas Fletcher
- Humphrey Gifford
- Sidney Godolphin
- Fulke Greville, Lord Brooke
- William Habington
- John Hall
- Christopher Harvey
- Robert Stephen Hawker
- Reginald Heber
- Robert Henryson
- George Herbert
- Mary Herbert, Countess of Pembroke
- Robert Herrick
- Thomas Heywood
- Gerard Manley Hopkins
- Lionel Johnson
- Ben Jonson
- John Keble
- Thomas Ken
- Charles Kingsley
- John Lydgate
- Andrew Marvell
- James Merrick
- Alice Meynell
- Henry Hart Milman
- John Milton
- Henry More
- William Morris
- Frederic W. H. Myers
- John Mason Neale
- John Henry Newman
- John Newton
- John Norris of Bemerton
- Clement Paman
- Coventry Patmore
- Thomas Pestel
- Ruth Pitter
- Alexander Pope
- Francis Quarles
- Sir Walter Ralegh
- Richard Rolle of Hampole
- Christina Georgina Rossetti
- Dante Gabriel Rossetti
- William Shakespeare
- Thomas Shepherd
- Sir Edward Sherburne
- James Shirley
- Fredegond Shove
- Sir Philip Sidney
- John Skelton
- Christopher Smart
- Robert Southwell
- Samuel Speed
- Edmund Spenser
- Richard Stanyhurst
- William Force Stead
- Jeremy Taylor
- Alfred Tennyson, Lord Tennyson
- Francis Thompson
- James Thomson
- Augustus Montague Toplady
- Thomas Traherne
- Richard Chenevix Trench
- Henry Vaughan
- Edmund Waller
- Nathaniel Wanley
- Thomas Washbourne
- Isaac Watts
- James, John and Robert Wedderburn
- Charles Wesley
- Samuel Wesley (poet)
- Robert Wild
- Charles Williams
- Richard Wilton
- William Wordsworth
- Sir Henry Wotton
- Edward Young

== New Oxford Book of Christian Verse (1981) ==
Edited by Donald Davie. Poets included were:

- Joseph Addison
- Cliff Ashby
- W. H. Auden
- William Baldwin
- Clifford Bax
- Richard Baxter
- Wendell Berry
- John Berryman
- Sir John Betjeman
- Thomas Binney
- William Blake
- Anne Bradstreet
- Robert Bridges
- John Bunyan
- Robert Burns
- John Byrom
- Thomas Campion
- Geoffrey Chaucer
- John Clare
- Jack Clemo
- Samuel Taylor Coleridge
- William Cowper
- Richard Crashaw
- Peter Dale
- Elizabeth Daryush
- Emily Dickinson
- Philip Doddridge
- John Donne
- H.D.
- John Dryden
- William Dunbar
- Timothy Dwight IV
- T. S. Eliot
- John Meade Falkner
- Padraic Fallon
- Giles Fletcher
- George Gascoigne
- Sidney Godolphin
- Fulke Greville
- Isaac Hann
- Reginald Heber
- George Herbert
- Mary Herbert, Countess of Pembroke
- Robert Herrick
- Geoffrey Hill
- Gerard Manley Hopkins
- Julia Ward Howe
- Alexander Hume
- Elizabeth Jennings
- David Jones
- Ben Jonson
- John Keble
- Thomas Ken
- William Kethe
- Thomas Kinsella
- William Langland
- Janet Lewis
- Henry Francis Lyte
- Andrew Marvell
- Alice Meynell
- John Milton
- Alexander Montgomerie
- James Montgomery
- Edwin Muir
- James McAuley
- John Mason Neale
- John Henry Newman
- John Newton
- Urian Oakes
- Edward Perronet
- F. T. Prince
- Matthew Prior
- Francis Quarles
- Christina Rossetti
- William Shakespeare
- Sir Philip Sidney
- C. H. Sisson
- Christopher Smart
- Stevie Smith
- Robert Southwell
- Edmund Spenser
- Nahum Tate
- Edward Taylor
- Alfred, Lord Tennyson
- R. S. Thomas
- Francis Thompson
- Augustus Montague Toplady
- Thomas Traherne
- Henry Vaughan
- Jones Very
- Edmund Waller
- Robert Penn Warren
- Thomas Washbourne
- Isaac Watts
- Charles Wesley
- John Brooks Wheelwright
- William Whiting
- John Greenleaf Whittier
- Charles Williams
- William Wordsworth
- Sir Thomas Wyatt
