= Oxford Book of Contemporary Verse =

Poetry anthology (1980)

First edition

The Oxford Book of Contemporary Verse, edited by D. J. Enright, is a poetry anthology from 1980, published by Oxford University Press. It might be considered one of the "last words" from a founder-member of The Movement, with its comments in the Introduction still in an anti-romantic vein, and that "the editor remains unpersuaded that wit is necessarily evasive in some shabby way or emotionally lowering". It was reissued in 1995 under the title Oxford Book of Verse 1945–1980 (ISBN 0-19-283188-7).

== Poets in the Oxford Book of Contemporary Verse ==
- Dannie Abse
- Kingsley Amis
- James K. Baxter
- Patricia Beer
- John Berryman
- Earle Birney
- Elizabeth Bishop
- George Mackay Brown
- Charles Causley
- Robert Conquest
- Donald Davie
- Douglas Dunn
- D. J. Enright
- Gavin Ewart
- Roy Fuller
- Thom Gunn
- Seamus Heaney
- John Heath-Stubbs
- Anthony Hecht
- Geoffrey Hill
- A. D. Hope
- Ted Hughes
- Randall Jarrell
- Philip Larkin
- Robert Lowell
- Norman MacCaig
- Derek Mahon
- Howard Nemerov
- Peter Porter
- A. K. Ramanujan
- Peter Redgrove
- Vernon Scannell
- Louis Simpson
- C. H. Sisson
- Stevie Smith
- Jon Stallworthy
- R. S. Thomas
- Charles Tomlinson
- Derek Walcott
- Richard Wilbur
