= Richard Kell =

Richard Kell may refer to:

- Richard Kell (footballer) (born 1979), English footballer
- Richard Kell (poet) (1927–2023), Irish poet
