= Chris Harvey =

Chris Harvey may refer to:

- Chris Harvey (ice hockey) (born 1967), American ice hockey goaltender
- Christopher Harvey (footballer) (born 1982), Jamaican footballer
- Christopher Harvey (poet) (1597–1663), English clergyman and poet
- Chris Harvey (businessman) (born 1964), English businessman and joint estate owner.
