= James Merrick =

English poet and scholar (1720–1769)

James Merrick (1720–1769) was an English poet and scholar; M.A. Trinity College, Oxford, 1742: fellow, 1745: ordained, but lived in college. It is said that "[h]e entered into holy orders, but never could engage in parochial duty, from being subject to excessive pains in his head". He published poems, including The Chameleon; translated from the Greek and advocated the compilation and amalgamation of indexes to the principal Greek authors; versified the Psalms, several editions of which were set to music. His work was featured in Oxford religious poetry anthologies.

== Works ==
Merrick wrote:

- The Messiah, a Divine Essay, Reading, 1734; juvenilia.
- The Destruction of Troy, being the sequel of the Iliad, translated from the Greek of Tryphiodorus, with Notes, Oxford, 1739. Gilbert Wakefield praised this translation.
- Tryphiodori Ilii excidium. Lacunas aliquot e codice manuscripto explevit et suas annotationes adjecit J. Merrick, 1741. When this work was edited by Friedrich August Wernicke at Leipzig in 1819, annotations of Merrick were reproduced.
- Dissertation on Proverbs, chap. ix. vv. 1–6, 1744.
- Prayers for a time of Earthquakes and Violent Floods, 1756.
- An Encouragement to a Good Life, addressed to some soldiers at Reading, 1759. James Granger in his Biographical History, writing about John Rawlet, says that nearly ten thousand copies of his tract Christian Monitor were distributed by Merrick, mainly among the soldiers at Reading.
- Poems on Sacred Subjects, 1763.
- Annotations, Critical and Grammatical, on chap. i. vv. 1–14 of St. John's Gospel, with a Discourse on Studying the Greek Language, 1764. This was followed by Second Part of Annotations on St. John's Gospel, to end of third chapter, 1767. Merrick's notes on the gospel passed on his death to John Loveday.
- A Letter to Mr. Joseph Warton, chiefly on the Composition of Greek Indexes, dated Reading, 11 October 1764. It advocated the compilation and amalgamation of indexes to the main ancient Greek authors. Twenty-three were finished, others were in progress. Further letters by Merrick to Warton are in John Wooll's ‘Life of Warton,’ pp. 310–12, 326–8. Three indexes by Robert Robinson of Reading published at Oxford in 1772, and the five indexes in William Etwall's edition of Three Dialogues of Plato, 1771, were compiled according to Merrick's rules.
- The Psalms Translated or Paraphrased in English Verse, Reading, 1765. Robert Lowth praised this version’ but it was condemned as slack by William Mason in Essays on English Church Music (1795). It was often reprinted in London, and selections were published at Halifax (1798) and Ipswich (1815). Several editions were published by William De Chair Tattersall, who also issued in a very expensive form, in 1794, the first volume of an edition "with new music". Sixteen psalms from Merrick's version were set to music in 1775 by William Hayes, for use in Magdalen College Chapel, Oxford, a new edition of which, arranged by W. Cross, came out in 1810; and a second set of 16 was arranged by Philip Hayes for the chapel. Eighteen of his psalms and three pieces from his volume of Poems on Sacred Subjects were given by John D. Julian's Hymnology as still included in hymn-books.
- Annotations on the Psalms, 1768. It embodied the comments of Robert Lowth and of an anonymous writer, who has been presumed to be Thomas Secker. The latter's remarks on Gregory Sharpe's arguments on Psalm 100 produced A Letter to the Bishop of Oxford from the Master of the Temple (1769).
- Manual of Prayers for Common Occasions, 1768, the ninth edition of which appeared in 1805; and it was reprinted in 1836. Translated into Welsh.

Now best known for his short poem The Chameleon, Merrick contributed to the verses which were issued by the university of Oxford on the accession of George III (1761), his marriage (1761), and the birth of his heir (1762), and many poems by him are in the collections of Dodsley, ed. 1766, George Pearch, Bell's Fugitive Poetry, and in Dodsley's Museum. Four English lines of his composition were placed over the debtors' gate of the old county gaol in Castle Street, Reading.

== Associations ==
Observations by Merrick on a fragment ascribed to Longinus are published by Nathaniel Lardner in the ‘Collection of Testimonies of Ancient Heathens on the Truth of the Christian Religion’ (Works, ed. 1838, vi. 380–1), and John Taylor, in the preface to ‘Marmor Sandvicense,’ 1743, wrote of obligations to him. Many letters to him from John Ward, and one from Bernard de Montfaucon, are in the British Library. By April 1739 he was corresponding on classical subjects with Hermann Samuel Reimar, the Dutch philologist, and there are references to his ‘Notes on Tryphiodorus’ in Johannes Alberti's final volume of "Hesychius".

== Legacy ==
Merrick bequeathed scarce and valuable books to John Loveday of Williamscote, near Banbury, and £400 to Trinity College.
