= James Rhoades =

British poet

James Rhoades (1841 – 15 March 1923) was an Anglo–Irish poet, translator and author. He worked as a schoolmaster.

== Life ==
Rhoades was born in Clonmel, County Tipperary and was educated at Rugby School and Trinity College, Cambridge, graduating B.A. in 1864 and M.A. in 1867. He taught at Haileybury College and Sherborne School. Between those posts, while his wife was ill, he was a tutor in Bournemouth.

Rhoades married Charlotte Elizabeth Lester, daughter of Lieutenant General Sir Frederick Parkinson Lester, they had two sons and two daughters together. He married secondly Alice Hunt, daughter of John Hunt.

Rhoades died in Kelvedon on 15 March 1923.

== Works ==
Rhoades has been described as "a conventional poet who wrote of imperial war in a conservative idiom and a grandiloquent style".

He was author of The City of the five gates (Chapman & Hall, 1913) which gives as a preface note:

The following poem is intended to convey the doctrine of what is often mistermed "The New Thought"; namely, that by conscious union with the indwelling Principle of Life, man may attain completeness here and now. "Out of the Silence," while structurally conforming to the Rubaiyat of Omar Khayyam, is directly opposite in its teaching.

A quote from this pamphlet (from Out of the Silence) was included in The Oxford Book of English Mystical Verse (1917, Nicholson & Lee, eds) as is O Soul of Mine.

Rhoades is quoted with approval by Sir Arthur Quiller-Couch in On the Art of Reading (1920).
