= Helen Gardner (critic) =

English literary critic and academic

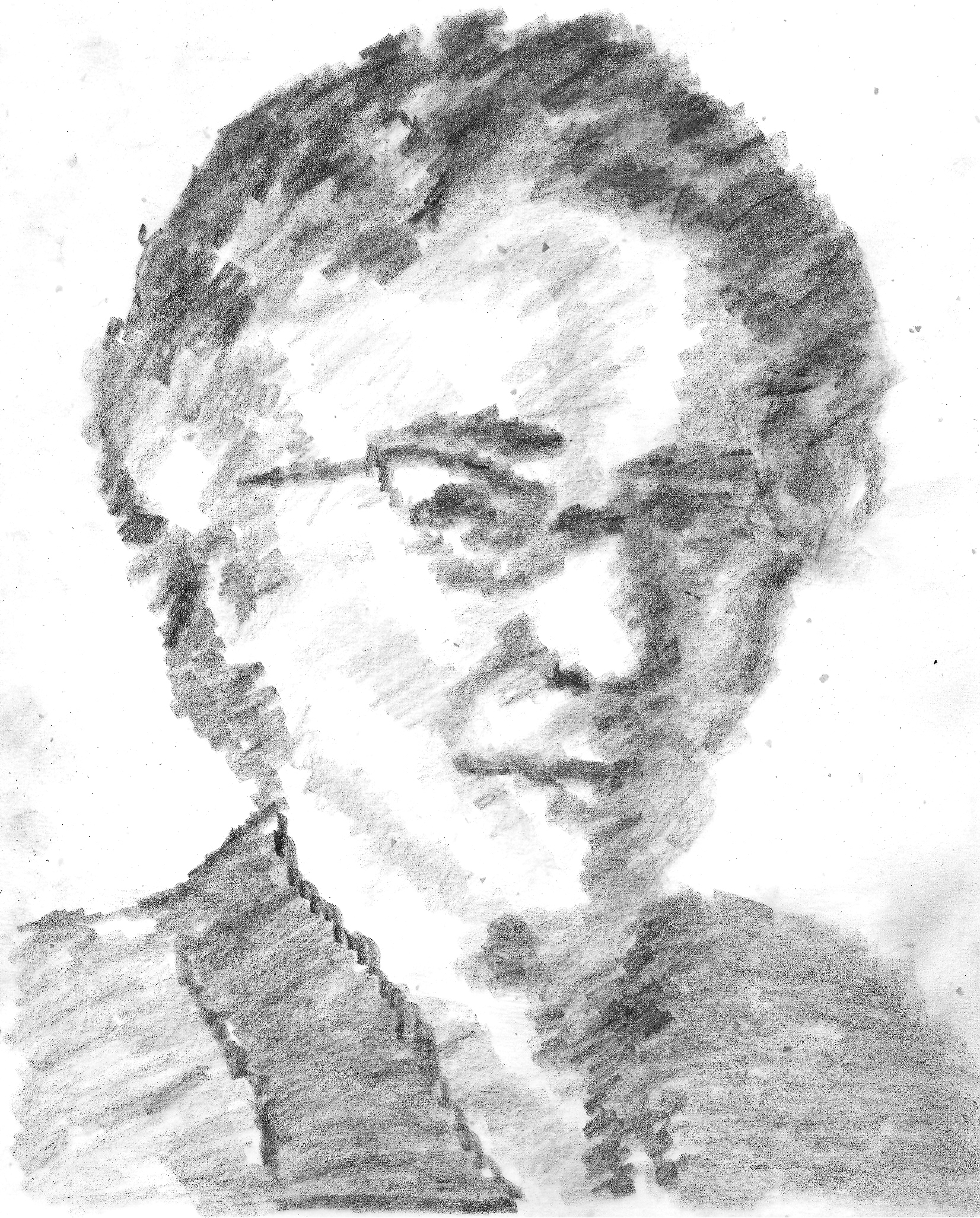
- Born: Helen Louise Gardner; 13 February 1908
- Died: 4 June 1986 (aged 78); Bicester, Oxfordshire, England
- Education: North London Collegiate School; St Hilda's College, Oxford
- Occupation: Professor
- Writing career
- Language: English
- Genre: Literary criticism
- Notable work: The New Oxford Book of English Verse 1250–1950
- Notable awards: Order of the British Empire

Dame Helen Louise Gardner, DBE, FBA (13 February 1908 – 4 June 1986) was an English literary critic and academic. Gardner began her teaching career at the University of Birmingham, and from 1966 to 1975 was a Merton Professor of English Literature at the University of Oxford, the first woman to have that position. She was best known for her work on the poets John Donne and T. S. Eliot, but also published on John Milton and William Shakespeare. She published over a dozen books, and received multiple honours.

Her critical stance was traditional and focused on history and biography; it involved the work's historical context, the personal habits of the author, and the relationship of the text to the time period. One of her beliefs was that a literary critic's job is to assist other people in reading for themselves.

== Personal life ==
Gardner was the daughter of Charles Henry and Helen Mary Roadnight Cockman Gardner. She went to North London Collegiate School. She did her B.A. at St Hilda's College, Oxford, in 1929, later receiving a M.A. at the same college in 1935.

== Academic career ==
Gardner's teaching career began at the University of Birmingham, where she held a temporary post as an assistant lecturer from 1930 to 1931. After three years as an assistant lecturer at Royal Holloway College in London, she returned to Birmingham, as a member of the English department (1934–41). She became a tutor at Oxford in 1941 and was a fellow of St Hilda's College, Oxford, from 1942 to 1966, where she was also a university reader in Renaissance English literature. From 1966 to 1975, Gardner was the Merton Professor of English Literature, the first woman to have that position, and a fellow of Lady Margaret Hall, Oxford.

The University of Cambridge offered Gardner the new chair in Medieval and Renaissance Literature, but she declined, in part because she had heard that the university's first choice, C. S. Lewis, had changed his mind about refusing the position.

== Critical approach and subject matter ==
Gardner published on T. S. Eliot from early on in her career; F. O. Matthiessen cited her 1942 essay "The Recent Poetry of T. S. Eliot" with approbation.

Her critical methodology included the work's historical context, the personal habits of the author, and the relationship of the text to the time period. She prepared several editions of poetry by John Donne, including The Divine Poems (1952), Selected Prose (1967) and The Elegies and the Songs of Sonnets (1965), all of which attracted commendation for her careful work. As a scholar of poetry by Eliot, she wrote three studies on him and said he was a major influence on her own criticism. She also wrote criticism on John Milton and William Shakespeare. Gardner influenced the perceptions of British poetry of many readers, especially poetry from the late sixteenth to the early seventeenth centuries. Gardner was an Anglican Christian and her faith was a subtle part of her writing.

Gardner, it is said, "belonged to no 'school'" of literary criticism. She was critical of the New Criticism and its insistence on multiple interpretations; she disavowed "the rejection of determinate meanings in texts", insisting that despite texts being open to multiple interpretations, there is still "intentional communication" for readers to try to understand. In 1979, when she delivered the Charles Eliot Norton Lectures (published as In Defence of the Imagination) Gardner said that she opposed the then-current trend of literary criticism to over-interpreting texts and using technical jargon. Of the function of a critic, she stated that it is to "shine a torch" and not "wield a sceptre", meaning that the function of a critic is "to illuminate rather than attack".

== Honours ==
Gardner she was appointed as a CBE in 1962 and as a Dame Commander of the Order of the British Empire in 1967. In 1971, she was elected as a Foreign Honorary Member of the American Academy of Arts and Sciences and an international member of the American Philosophical Society in 1982. She received honorary degrees from Cambridge, London, Harvard and Yale universities. She died in Bicester in 1986.

== Legacy ==
Gardner's will bequeathed the royalties from the New Oxford Book of English Verse to the National Portrait Gallery, for the purchase of portraits relating to English literature and portraits from the late 16th and early 17th centuries. The character E. M. Ashford in Margaret Edson's Wit is based on Gardner. Wit was later adapted into a 2001 film. She was listed in International Who's Who in Poetry 2004 under the subheading "Literary Figures of the Past".

== Works by Helen Gardner ==
Gardner wrote more than a dozen books: monographs, critical editions, and anthologies. She edited The New Oxford Book of English Verse 1250–1950 (published 1972), which replaced Arthur Quiller-Couch's The Oxford Book of English Verse. The New Oxford Book of English Verse 1250–1950 was also published in braille.

Gardner's 1971 book Religion and Literature collects two lecture series, the 1966 Ewing Lectures on religious poetry and the 1968 T. S. Eliot Memorial Lectures on tragedy. Diana Fortuna, reviewing the book for the Modern Language Review, praised the lectures on tragedy as "an essential introduction to the subject", but was less impressed with the lectures on religious poetry, judging that it covered too much material and consequently did not treat some selections "fully enough".

She also published an anthology of religious poetry, A Book of Religious Verse, which according to her 1972 reviewer in The New York Times "should be read in conjunction with her provocative lectures on religious poetry printed in her Religion and Literature". The reviewer noted Gardner's attempt to find "viable" religious poetry from the 20th century, but found that religious poems by Edwin Muir and W. H. Auden could not compare "with Herbert, Donne or Milton", and thought the volume "end[ed] with a whimper". Other criticism of her work includes her focus on judgments in analyzing literary works.

=== Bibliography ===
- The Art of T. S. Eliot (1949)
- The Divine Poems of John Donne (1952)
- The Metaphysical Poets (1957)
- The Business of Criticism (1959)
- Edwin Muir: the W. D. Thomas Memorial Lecture (1961)
- The Elegies and the Songs and Sonnets of John Donne (1965)
- A Reading of Paradise Lost: the Alexander Lectures in the University of Toronto (1962)
- The Waste Land 1972: The Adamson lecture, 3rd May 1972 (See List of Adamson Lectures.)
