= John Holloway (poet) =

English poet, critic and academic

John Holloway (1 August 1920 – 29 August 1999) was an English poet, critic and academic.

== Personal life ==
Born in Croydon, South London (but then part of Surrey) and educated at the County School at Beckenham in Kent and the University of Oxford (New College), he served in the Royal Artillery and Intelligence during the Second World War and then pursued an academic career.

He was married twice, in 1946 to Audrey Gooding with whom he had a son and daughter, and in 1978 to Joan Black. He died in Cambridge.

== Academic career ==
He was a fellow of All Souls College, Oxford, from 1946 to 1960 and of Queens' College, Cambridge, from 1955 to 1982, becoming a Life Fellow on his retirement. He held a post as lecturer in English at Aberdeen University (1949–54), and then moved to the University of Cambridge, where he was successively Lecturer in English (1954–66), Reader (1966-72), and Professor of Modern English (1972–82). He was elected a Fellow of the Royal Society of Literature in 1956. Holloway gave the 1958 Chatterton Lecture on Poetry. From 1961 to 1963 he served as Byron Professor at the University of Athens. As Chairman of the Department of English at Cambridge (1970–71), he initiated an important broadening of the undergraduate literature curriculum, in particular to include American literature.

== Literary career ==
Holloway was among the contributors to New Lines (1956), a group anthology by Movement poets edited by Robert Conquest. However, Iain Wright counsels that Holloway "was not … of any movement" and that "his poetic voice, with its odd blend of cerebration and sensuality, the donnish and the Dionysiac, was entirely his own, sui generis."

James Diggle has called Holloway's long poem Civitatula (1993) "the culmination of his poetic achievement." Howard Erskine-Hill reports that "Some claim that Civitatula is the best long poem written out of England since Four Quartets."

== Bibliography (incomplete) ==
=== Philosophy ===
- Language and Intelligence (Macmillan, 1951)
- The Victorian Sage: Studies in Argument (Macmillan, 1953)

=== Criticism ===
- The Charted Mirror (Routledge and Kegan Paul, 1960)
- The Story of the Night (Routledge and Kegan Paul, 1961)
- The Colours of Clarity (Routledge and Kegan Paul, 1963)
- Widening Horizons in English Verse (Routledge and Kegan Paul, 1966)
- Blake: The Lyric Poetry (Hodder and Stoughton, 1975)
- The Proud Knowledge (Routledge and Kegan Paul, 1977)
- Narrative and Structure (Cambridge University Press, 1979)
- The Slumber of Apollo (Cambridge University Press, 1983)

=== Poetry ===
- John Holloway: The Fantasy Poets Number Twenty-Six (Fantasy Press, 1954)
- The Minute and Longer Poems (Marvell Press, 1956)
- The Fugue and Shorter Pieces (Routledge and Kegan Paul, 1960)
- The Landfallers: A Poem in Twelve Parts (Routledge and Kegan Paul, 1962)
- The Lion Hunt (Routledge and Kegan Paul, 1964)
- Wood and Windfall (Routledge and Kegan Paul, 1967)
- Planet of Winds (Routledge and Kegan Paul, 1977)
- Civitatula (Cambridgeshire Libraries, 1993)

=== Memoir ===
- A London Childhood (Routledge and Kegan Paul, 1966)

=== Edited volumes ===
- Poems of the Mid-Century (Harrap, 1957)
- Later English Broadside Ballads, 2 vols. (with Joan Black) (Routledge and Kegan Paul, 1975, 1979)
- Oxford Book of Local Verses (Oxford University Press, 1987)
