= Frances Bannerman =

Canadian painter and poet (1855–1944)

- Born: Frances Jones; 1855; Halifax, Nova Scotia
- Died: October 6, 1944 (aged 88–89); Torquay, England
- Known for: painter, poet
- Spouse: Hamlet Bannerman (m. 1886)

Frances Bannerman (née Jones) (1855–1944) was a Canadian painter and poet. She painted in oil and watercolour and made black and white illustrations.

== Biography ==
She was born in Halifax, Nova Scotia, in 1855. She was the youngest daughter of Lt. Governor Alfred G. Jones and Margaret Wiseman Stairs. She grew up in what is now the Waegwoltic Club. Bannerman received her early art education from her mother and from Forshaw Day, one of the founding members of the Royal Canadian Academy of Arts, in Halifax.

In Paris, she studied at the ateliers of Edouard Krug and François-Nicolas-Augustin Feyen-Perrin, where she developed her skill as a figure painter. While living in Paris, Bannerman was one of the first North American artists to be influenced by Impressionism and began to use a brighter colour palette and depict light while working en plein air, although she preferred a more academic approach in her brushwork. Her early adoption to Impressionist painting principles had a large effect across Halifax in the early 1900s.

She began exhibiting her work in London, England in 1882 and was a regular contributor to shows, including those of the Royal Academy of Arts and Royal Society of British Artists, until 1892. In 1882, she was the first woman to be elected an Associate of the Royal Canadian Academy of Arts, and only the second woman to be a member of that academy (the first being Academician Charlotte Schreiber). That year, she exhibited three works at the Royal Canadian Academy, one of which was purchased by the Marquis of Lorne, the governor general of Canada.

In 1883, she exhibited at the Paris Salon. One of the works she submitted, Le Jardin d'hiver (The Conservatory), depicts a view of her cousin reading in the Joneses' family home in Halifax. It is said to be the "first Canadian subject ever to be shown in that venue".

In 1886, at age 31, she married Hamlet Bannerman, a London painter, in Halifax and that year they moved to Great Marlowe, England. Due to her health, she was forced to give up painting and in 1899 published a volume of her verse, entitled Milestones. Her best-known poem is "An Upper Chamber", which is included in the Oxford Book of English Verse. She moved to Italy in 1901, and stayed there until the Second World War forced her to leave. She returned to Torquay, England, where she died in 1944.

== Works ==
- "Le Jardin d'hiver" ("The Conservatory) (submission to the 1883 Salon)
- "An Upper Chamber"
- Art Gallery of Nova Scotia Collection
- Her art is exhibited at the art gallery of The Rooms in Newfoundland.
