= Some Notes on Rhythm in Verse =

Some Notes on Rhythm in Verse by Donald Davie first appeared in the Agenda poetry journal, in the Autumn / Winter issue 1972–73, and was later collected in his book of essays and interviews, Trying To Explain.

It is a short piece comprising seven numbered paragraphs. He makes a case for scansion being 'a sort of crutch or scaffolding in the act of composition'.

The first paragraph states that the boundary between free verse and metred verse is 'smudged'. He writes: "If you shorten an iambic measure to the trimeter, and then allow yourself all the liberties that traditional prosody allows you, you have a measure which few readers will scan, even subconsciously."

== Sources ==
- Donald Davie, Trying To Explain, University of Michigan, 1979; Carcanet, 1980. ISBN 0-85635-642-5
