= Norman Gale =

English poet (1862–1942)

Norman Rowland Gale (4 March 1862 – 7 October 1942) was a poet, novelist and reviewer, who published many books over a period of nearly fifty years.

Gale was born in Kew, Surrey. He entered Exeter College, Oxford in 1880 and graduated in 1884. He was a teacher for some years, but in 1892 he began writing full-time. His poems "Betrothed" and "The Call" appeared in The Yellow Book. His best-known poem is probably "The Country Faith", which is in The Oxford Book of English Verse. In the United States, Louis Untermeyer included it in his anthology Modern British Poetry, and, with a change of title to "Life in the Country", it opened the second reader in Cora Wilson Stewart's series, Country Life Readers.

For the last two years of his life Gale lived in Headley Down, Hampshire, where he died at the age of eighty.

== Publications ==
- A Country Muse, 1892; reprinted with additions as A Country Muse: First Series, 1894
- A Country Muse: New Series, 1893; reprinted with additions as A Country Muse: Second Series, 1895
- Orchard Songs, [1893]
- A June Romance [novel], 1894
- Cricket Songs, 1894
- All Expenses Paid, 1895
- Songs for Little People, 1896
- (ed.) Poems by John Clare, 1901
- Barty's Star [novel], 1903
- More Cricket Songs, 1905
- A Book of Quatrains, 1909
- Song in September, 1912
- Solitude, 1913
- Collected Poems, 1914
- The Candid Cuckoo, 1918
- A Merry-go-Round of Song, 1919
- Verse in Bloom, 1925
- A Flight of Fancies, 1926
- Messrs Bat and Ball, 1930
- Close of Play, 1936
- Remembrances, 1937
- Love-in-a-Mist, 1939
