= The New Oxford Book of English Verse 1250–1950 =

1972 poetry anthology edited by Helen Gardner

- First edition cover
- Author: Helen Gardner (ed)
- Language: English
- Genre: poetry
- Publisher: Clarendon Press
- Publication date: 1972
- Media type: Print
- Pages: 974
- ISBN: 0-19-812136-9

The New Oxford Book of English Verse 1250–1950 is a poetry anthology edited by Helen Gardner, and published in New York and London in 1972 by Clarendon Press. It was intended as a replacement for the older Quiller-Couch Oxford Book of English Verse. Selections were largely restricted to British and Irish poets (with Ezra Pound being allowed a special status).

== Poets in The New Oxford Book of English Verse 1250–1950 ==
William Allingham - Matthew Arnold - W. H. Auden - William Barnes - Richard Barnfield - John Beaumont - Thomas Lovell Beddoes - Aphra Behn - Hilaire Belloc - John Betjeman - Laurence Binyon - William Blake - Edmund Blunden - Mark Alexander Boyd - Nicholas Breton - Robert Bridges - Emily Brontë - Rupert Brooke - William Browne of Tavistock - Elizabeth Barrett Browning - Robert Browning - John Bunyan - Robert Burns - Samuel Butler - John Byrom - George Gordon Noel Byron - Thomas Campbell - Thomas Campion - Thomas Carew - Lewis Carroll - George Chapman - Thomas Chatterton - Geoffrey Chaucer - G. K. Chesterton - Henry Chettle - John Clare - John Cleveland - Arthur Hugh Clough - Samuel Taylor Coleridge - William Collins - William Congreve - Richard Corbet - William Cornish - William Cory - Abraham Cowley - George Crabbe - Richard Crashaw - Samuel Daniel - George Darley - William Davenant - John Davidson - John Davies - W. H. Davies - Cecil Day-Lewis - Walter de la Mare - Richard Watson Dixon - John Donne - Keith Douglas - Ernest Dowson - Michael Drayton - William Drummond of Hawthornden - John Dryden - William Dunbar - Edward Dyer - T. S. Eliot - William Empson - Richard Fanshawe - Edward Fitzgerald - James Elroy Flecker - Giles Fletcher - Phineas Fletcher - John Ford - Roy Fuller - George Gascoigne - John Gay - Sidney Godolphin - Oliver Goldsmith - James Graham - Robert Graves - Thomas Gray - Robert Greene - Fulke Greville - William Habington - Thomas Hardy - William Ernest Henley - George Herbert - Lord Herbert of Cherbury - Robert Herrick - Ralph Hodgson - Thomas Hood - Gerard Manley Hopkins - A. E. Housman - Henry Howard, Earl of Surrey - James Leigh Hunt - Lionel Johnson - Samuel Johnson - Ben Jonson - Thomas Jordan - James Joyce - John Keats - Henry King - Rudyard Kipling - Francis Kynaston - Charles Lamb - Walter Savage Landor - William Langland - D. H. Lawrence - Edward Lear - Alun Lewis - Thomas Lodge - Richard Lovelace - John Lyly - Thomas Babington Macaulay - Louis MacNeice - Christopher Marlowe - Andrew Marvell - John Masefield - George Meredith - Alice Meynell - John Milton - Thomas Moore - Thomas Osbert Mordaunt - William Morris - Edwin Muir - Anthony Munday - Thomas Nashe - Charles of Orleans - Wilfred Owen - Coventry Patmore - Thomas Love Peacock - George Peele - Alexander Pope - Ezra Pound - Winthrop Mackworth Praed - Matthew Prior - Francis Quarles - Kathleen Raine - Walter Raleigh - Thomas Randolph - Henry Reed - Anne Ridler - Samuel Rogers - Isaac Rosenberg - Christina Rossetti - Dante Gabriel Rossetti - Charles Sackville - Thomas Sackville - Siegfried Sassoon - John Scott of Amwell - Walter Scott - Charles Sedley - William Shakespeare - Percy Bysshe Shelley - William Shenstone - James Shirley - Philip Sidney - Edith Sitwell - John Skelton - Christopher Smart - Stevie Smith - Robert Southwell - Stephen Spender - Thomas Stanley - Robert Louis Stevenson - William Strode - John Suckling - Jonathan Swift - Algernon Charles Swinburne - Alfred Tennyson - Chidiock Tichborne - Dylan Thomas - Francis Thompson - James Thomson (The Seasons) - James Thomson ('B.V.') - Aurelian Townsend - Thomas Traherne - Walter James Turner - Henry Vaughan - Edmund Waller - Isaac Watts - John Webster - Charles Wesley - Robert Wever - Oscar Wilde - John Wilmot - George Wither - Charles Wolfe - William Wordsworth - Henry Wotton - Thomas Wyatt - W. B. Yeats

== See also ==
- 1972 in poetry
- 20th century in poetry
- English poetry
- Irish poetry
- Oxford poetry anthologies
- List of poetry anthologies
