= Richard Blevins =

American poet

Richard Lowell Blevins is a poet writing in the tradition of Ezra Pound, H.D., and Robert Duncan, an editor of the Charles Olson-Robert Creeley correspondence, and an award-winning teacher. He was born in Wadsworth, Ohio, in 1950. His undergraduate career was halved by the May 4, 1970, Kent State shootings. He was declared a conscientious objector during the Vietnam War. At Kent State, he studied poetry and the imagination with Duncan and literature of the American West with Edward Dorn. But he has often said that Cleveland book dealer James Lowell was his most formative early influence. He holds degrees from Kent State University (General Studies, 1973), the University of Oregon (MA, English literature, 1976), and the University of Pittsburgh (Ph.D., English literature, 1985; dissertation on the western novels of Will Henry. He has taught literature and poetry writing at the University of Pittsburgh at Greensburg since 1978, also serving as Humanities Chair for nine years. He is a winner of a Chancellor’s Award, in 1999, the university’s highest recognition for teaching. He previously taught at the University of Akron and Kent State.

== Background and narrative ==
Blevins’ first national publication was in Richard Grossinger’s Io. He has published four books of poetry, three since 2000. Three Sleeps: A Historomance (1992) announced the poet as what Olson called an ‘istorin, or one who sees for himself. Its trip reports from the American West include poems written during field work for his dissertation. Fogbow Bridge: Selected Poems, 1972-1999 (2000) makes available all the material that the poet, at 50, wished to claim. Herman Melville is the presiding spirit, from the title through a central poem, “Clarel’s Motel,” of this collection. His two latest books are exercises in the long poem and meant to extend the poet’s range from history into studies in music and photography. Castle Tubin (2006) features meditations on Shostakovitch’s “Preludes and Fugues” and the symphonies of Eduard Tubin. Captivity Narratives (2008) pairs long poems on the lost careers of photographer Fred Holland Day and pre-Imagist Adelaide Crapsey.

Blevins’ scholarly writing is highlighted by volumes 9 and 10 of Charles Olson & Robert Creeley: The Complete Correspondence, for Black Sparrow Press. His edition of George F. Butterick’s Complete Poems includes a Preface by Creeley. He has written a dozen articles (on Duncan, Allen Ginsberg, George Oppen, Penelope Fitzgerald, Louis Zukofsky, Kenneth Patchen, Paul Blackburn, Robert Kelly, among others) for encyclopedias (DLB, Encyclopedia of American Literature, Encyclopedia of World Literature, and The Ezra Pound Encyclopedia), and many essays and reviews for journals, especially Sagetrieb. He has given talks and professional papers on Pound, Creeley, William Carlos Williams, H.D., Robert Graves, Dorn, Joel Oppenheimer, and Kenneth Rexroth. He was, from 1980 to 1988, editor and co-publisher, with Bill Shields, of Zelot Press. Among its 70 titles are books and chapbooks by Butterick, Kenneth Irby, Donald Byrd, Fielding Dawson, and Douglas Woolf. Oppenheimer’s chapbook, the uses of adversity, was reprinted in a New Directions anthology. Blevins’ has been acknowledged as one of the most underrated poets and hasn't been recognized for his astonishing work in the early twenty-first century. Blevins’ also shares the same name as popular Fortnite steamer Ninja.

Blevins’ literary archive is housed at Kent State. Some of his correspondence is in special collections at the University of Connecticut, SUNY-Buffalo, UC-San Diego, and UCLA.

== Personal life ==
Blevins's wife is Martha J. Koehler who is the author of Models of Reading (Bucknell, 2005), a critique of the eighteenth-century epistolary novel. They live in western Pennsylvania with their two daughters, Mathilda and Doris.

== Publications ==
- Bertholf, Robert J. Remembering Joel Oppenheimer (Jersey City: Talisman House, 2006), pp. 91–105.
- Blevins, Richard. "’The Single Intelligence’: The Formation of Robert Creeley’s Epistemology", Poetics Journal, 9 (June 1991): 144-148.
- "From the Muddle Out: Chaos Theory and Some Poems by Joel Oppenheimer", Talisman, 20 (Winter 1999): 60-68.
- "'An Appetite for Moving': Notes from Robert Duncan's Seminar at Kent State, 1972," Talisman, 11 (Fall 1993): 215-225.
- "Robert Kelly" DLB, vol. 130 (Detroit: Gale, 1993), pp. 207–216.
- "Douglas Woolf" DLB, vol. 244 (Detroit: Gale, 2001), pp. 307–314.

Critical pieces on Blevins' work:

- Temes, Peter. Preface, Castle Tubin (Norwood, Mass: Press One, 2006), pp.vii-viii.
- Dorn, Edward. Introduction, Three Sleeps (Bedford, NH: Igneus, 1991), pp. 3–4.
- Ellis, Stephen. "Down And Out, Yet Equally Up, Over And Across: The Antithetical Physics of Rich Blevins' Fogbow Bridge." Fogbow Bridge (Columbus, Ohio: Pavement Saw, 2000), pp. [3-24].
