= The Oxford Book of English Verse =

1900 poetry anthology

The Oxford Book of English Verse, 1250–1900 is an anthology of English poetry, edited by Arthur Quiller-Couch, that had a very substantial influence on popular taste and perception of poetry for at least a generation. It was published by Oxford University Press in 1900; in its India-paper form it was carried widely around the British Empire and in war as a 'knapsack book'.

The 1900 edition, originally conceived under the title Lyra Britannica, was designed to supersede Palgrave's The Golden Treasury (1861) by focusing on lyric poetry, which allowed for the inclusion of twice as many works. In print for almost 40 years, the first edition sold over 500,000 copies with 21 impressions.

In 1939, Quiller-Couch revised the volume, deleting several poems (especially from the late 19th century) that he regretted including and adding instead many poems published before 1901 as well as poems published up to 1918. The second edition continued to sell even after the appearance of the 1972 New Oxford Book of English Verse and is now available online.

The success of The Oxford Book of English Verse led to further poetry anthologies under the title of "Oxford Books," which were edited by Quiller-Couch and others. Early volumes included The Oxford Book of Ballads (1910), The Oxford Book of Victorian Verse (1912), as well as collections of French, Italian, German, Latin, Spanish, and Canadian verse, and the series continues.

Oxonian Dedication

"To the President and Fellows and Scholars of Trinity College Oxford / a house of learning; ancient, liberal, humane, and my most kindly nurse"

== The Oxford Book of English Verse 1250–1918 (1939 edition) ==
Revision also by Quiller-Couch. Poets included were:

- Abraham Cowley
- Agnes Mary Frances Duclaux
- Alexander Brome
- Alexander Montgomerie
- Alexander Pope
- Alexander Scott
- Alfred Edward Housman
- Alfred Noyes
- Algernon Charles Swinburne
- Alice Meynell
- Allan Cunningham
- Allan Ramsay
- Andrew Lang
- Andrew Marvell
- Anna Laetitia Barbauld
- Anthony Munday
- Aphra Behn
- Arthur Christopher Benson
- Arthur Hugh Clough
- Aubrey De Vere
- Ben Jonson
- Bliss Carman
- Bret Harte
- Bryan Waller Procter
- Carolina, Lady Nairne
- Caroline Elizabeth Sarah Norton
- Charles Cotton
- Charles Hamilton Sorley
- Charles Kingsley
- Charles Lamb
- Charles Sackville, Earl of Dorset
- Charles Tennyson Turner
- Charles Wesley
- Charles Whitehead
- Charles Williams
- Charles Wolfe
- Christina Georgina Rossetti
- Christopher Marlowe
- Christopher Smart
- Coventry Patmore
- Dante Gabriel Rossetti
- Dora Sigerson
- Douglas Hyde
- Earl of Dorset
- Ebenezer Elliott
- Ebenezer Jones
- Eden Phillpotts
- Edgar Allan Poe
- Edmund Blunden
- Edmund Spenser
- Edmund Waller
- Edward FitzGerald
- Edward Thomas
- Edward Thurlow, Lord Thurlow
- Elizabeth Barrett Browning
- Emily Brontë
- Emily Dickinson
- Emily Lawless
- Ernest Dowson - Sir Francis Hastings Doyle
- Ernest Rhys
- Fanny Greville
- Felicia Dorothea Hemans
- F. or W. Davison
- Frances Bannerman
- Francis Beaumont
- Francis Mahony
- Francis Quarles
- Francis Thompson
- Francis William Bourdillon
- Frederick Tennyson
- Fulke Greville, Lord Brooke
- Geoffrey Chaucer
- George Chapman
- George Crabbe
- George Darley
- George du Maurier
- George Fox
- George Gascoigne
- George Gordon, Lord Byron
- George Herbert
- George MacDonald
- George Meredith
- George Peele
- AE
- George Wither
- Gerald Griffin
- Gerard Manley Hopkins
- Giles Fletcher
- G. K. Chesterton
- Gordon Bottomley
- Hartley Coleridge
- Henry Austin Dobson
- Henry Carey
- Henry Charles Beeching
- Henry Clarence Kendall
- Henry Constable
- Henry Cust
- Henry Howard, Earl of Surrey
- Earl of Surrey
- Henry King
- Henry Rowe
- Sir Henry Taylor
- Henry Vaughan
- Henry Wadsworth Longfellow
- Herbert Edward Palmer - Sir Gilbert Parker
- Herbert Trench
- Hilaire Belloc
- Isaac Watts
- Isabel Pagan
- James Beattie
- James Clarence Mangan
- James Elroy Flecker
- James Graham, Marquis of Montrose
- Leigh Hunt
- James Hogg
- James I of Scotland
- James Joyce
- James Shirley
- James Stephens
- James Thomson ('B.V.')
- James Thomson (The Seasons)
- Jane Elliot
- Jasper Mayne
- Jean Ingelow
- Jeremiah Joseph Callanan
- Joanna Baillie
- John Barbour
- John Boyle O'Reilly
- John Bunyan
- John Clare
- John Davidson
- John Donne
- John Dryden
- John Fletcher
- John Ford
- John Gay
- John Gibson Lockhart
- John Greenleaf Whittier
- John Reynolds
- John Heywood
- John Keats
- John Keble
- John Kenyon
- John Leicester Warren, Lord De Tabley
- John Lydgate
- John Lyly
- John Masefield
- John Milton
- John Oldham
- John Ruskin
- John Scott of Amwell
- John Sheffield, Duke of Buckinghamshire
- John Skelton
- Sir John Suckling
- John Webster
- John Wilmot, Earl of Rochester
- Joseph Addison
- Joseph Blanco White
- Joshua Sylvester
- Julian Grenfell
- Katharine Tynan Hinkson
- Katherine Philips
- Lady Anne Lindsay
- Lascelles Abercrombie
- Laurence Binyon
- Lionel Johnson
- Lord Alfred Douglas
- Lord Herbert of Cherbury
- Lord Tennyson
- Margaret Louisa Woods
- Mark Akenside
- Mark Alexander Boyd
- Mary Elizabeth Coleridge
- Mary Lamb
- Matthew Arnold
- Matthew Prior
- May Probyn
- Michael Bruce
- Michael Drayton
- Nicholas Breton
- Nicholas Grimald
- Norman Gale
- Oliver Goldsmith
- Oliver St. John Gogarty
- Orinda
- Padraic Colum
- Percy Bysshe Shelley
- Phineas Fletcher
- Ralph Hodgson
- Ralph Waldo Emerson
- Richard Barnefield
- Richard Crashaw
- Richard Doddridge Blackmore
- Richard Edwardes
- Richard Henry Horne
- Richard Jago
- Richard Le Gallienne
- Richard Lovelace
- Lord Houghton
- Richard Rowlands
- Richard Watson Dixon
- Robert Bridges
- Robert Browning
- Robert Burns
- Robert Cunninghame-Grahame of Gartmore
- Robert Greene
- Robert Henryson
- Robert Herrick
- Robert Louis Stevenson
- Robert Mannyng of Brunne
- Robert Southey
- Robert Stephen Hawker
- Robert Wever
- Rudyard Kipling
- Rupert Brooke
- Samuel Daniel
- Sir Samuel Ferguson
- Samuel Johnson
- Samuel Rogers
- Samuel Taylor Coleridge
- Selwyn Image
- Siegfried Sassoon
- Sir Aubrey de Vere
- Sir Charles Sedley
- Sir Edmund Gosse
- Sir George Etherege
- Sir Henry Newbolt
- Sir Henry Wotton
- Sir John Beaumont
- Sir John Davies
- Sir Philip Sidney
- Sir Richard Fanshawe
- Sir Robert Ayton - Lady Grizel Baillie
- Sir Walter Raleigh
- Sir Walter Scott
- Sir William Davenant
- Stephen Hawes
- Sydney Dobell
- Thomas Babington Macaulay, Lord Macaulay
- Thomas Campbell
- Thomas Campion
- Thomas Carew
- Thomas Chatterton
- Thomas Dekker
- Thomas d'Urfey
- Thomas Edward Brown
- Thomas Flatman
- Thomas Gray
- Thomas Hardy
- Thomas Heywood
- Thomas Hoccleve
- Thomas Hood
- Thomas Jordan
- Thomas Lodge
- Thomas Lovell Beddoes
- Thomas Love Peacock
- Thomas Moore
- Thomas Nashe
- Thomas Osbert Mordaunt
- Thomas Otway
- Thomas Parnell
- Thomas Randolph
- Thomas Stanley
- Thomas Traherne
- Charles Webbe
- Thomas William Rolleston
- Sir Thomas Wyatt
- Tobias George Smollett
- T. Sturge Moore
- Walter Chalmers Smith
- Walter de la Mare
- Walter Savage Landor
- Walt Whitman
- William Henry Davies
- Wilfred Owen
- Wilfrid Scawen Blunt
- Wilfrid Thorley
- William Alexander, Earl of Stirling
- William Allingham
- William Barnes
- William Bell Scott
- William Blake
- William Brighty Rands
- William Broome
- William Browne of Tavistock
- William Butler Yeats
- William Cartwright
- William Collins
- William Congreve
- William Cornish
- William Cowper
- William Cullen Bryant
- William Dean Howells
- William Drummond of Hawthornden
- William Dunbar
- William Ernest Henley
- William Habington
- William Cory
- Sir William Jones
- William Langland
- William Lisle Bowles
- William Makepeace Thackeray
- William Morris
- William Oldys
- William Philpot
- William Shakespeare
- William Shenstone
- William Sidney Walker
- William Stevenson
- William Strode
- William Thom
- William Walsh
- Sir William Watson
- William Wordsworth
- Winthrop Mackworth Praed
