= Richard Kell (poet) =

Irish poet (1927–2023)

- Born: 1 November 1927; Youghal, County Cork, Ireland
- Died: 14 November 2022 (aged 95)
- Writing career
- Genre: Poet

Richard Alexander Kell (1 November 1927 – 14 November 2022) was an Irish poet, composer and teacher.

== Biography ==
Kell was born in Youghal, County Cork, Ireland, on 1 November 1927, as the second of a Methodist missionary's four children. After early years in India he was educated mainly in Belfast and Dublin, where he graduated from Trinity College. He taught in England, finally as a senior lecturer in English and American literature. He contributed critical essays and poetry reviews to various periodicals (including The Guardian), and after retirement co-edited Other Poetry.

Kell began writing poetry at the age of ten, and at eighteen achieved newspaper publication with his now widely known poem 'Pigeons'. Since then his work has appeared in magazines, anthologies, and sixteen solo collections large and small (see bibliography).

Until 1995 Kell also wrote a small amount of music. He had public performances by vocal and instrumental soloists and ensembles, and (including a few broadcasts) by six orchestras, among them the BBC Concert Orchestra, Northern Sinfonia, and – while he was temporarily using the pseudonym Alec Richard – the Liverpool Philharmonic. His 17-minute Symphonic Elegy was composed in 1976 to commemorate the death of his wife Muriel the year before. His Variations on a notorious theme was broadcast in 1979.

Kell died on 14 November 2022, at the age of 95.

== Bibliography ==
- Fantasy Poets 35 (Eynsham, Oxfordshire: Fantasy Press, 1957; OCLC 11120806)
- Control Tower (London: Chatto & Windus, 1962; OCLC 9253366)
- Differences (London: Chatto & Windus, 1969; ISBN 978-0-701115-24-1)
- Humours (Sutherland: Ceolfrith Press, 1978; ISBN 978-0-904461-52-7, 978-0-904461-51-0)
- Heartwood (Newcastle upon Tyne: Northern House, 1978; ISBN 978-0-900570-22-3, 978-0-900570-21-6)
- The Broken Circle (Sunderland: Ceolfrith Press, 1981; ISBN 978-0-904461-69-5)
- In Praise of Warmth, new and selected poems (Dublin: Dedalus Press, 1987; ISBN 978-0-948268-21-2)
- Rock and Water (Dublin: Dedalus Press, 1993; ISBN 978-1-873790-34-2)
- Collected Poems (Belfast: Lagan Press, 2001; ISBN 978-1-873687-12-3)
- Under the Rainbow (Belfast: Lagan Press, 2003; ISBN 978-1-873687-88-8)
- Letters to Enid (Beeston: Shoestring Press, 2004; ISBN 978-1-904886-04-4)
- Taking a Break (Shoestring Press, 2008; ISBN 978-1-904886-80-8)
- Hilarity and Wonder (Shoestring Press, 2011; ISBN 978-1-907356-15-5)
- Old Man Answering (Shoestring Press, 2014; ISBN 978-1-910323-04-5)
- Making Word Gifts (Shoestring Press, 2016; ISBN 978-1-910323-67-0)
- The Whispering Sky (Shoestring Press, 2020; ISBN 978-1-912524-50-1)
