= Astrid Cabral =

Brazilian novelist, critic, environmentalist, and diplomat

- Born: 25 September 1936 (age 90); Manaus, Amazonas, Brazil
- Occupation: Author
- Writing career
- Notable work: Jaula

Astrid Cabral Félix de Sousa (born 1936) is a novelist, critic, environmentalist, and diplomat, and one of the most eminent contemporary poets in Brazil. She is the author of numerous books of poetry, including Through Water (2003) and Anteroom (2007), along with many collections of essays and short fiction. Born in Manaus, Amazonas, she has lived and worked as a diplomat in Beirut and Chicago and has taught in both the United States and Brazil. A mother of five, she currently resides in Rio de Janeiro, where she continues her work as a figure in the Amazonian cultural identity and recovery movement.

== Life and work ==
At a young age Cabral's family moved across the country to Rio de Janeiro, where she eventually pursued a teaching degree and taught at a local high school. During the 1950s, Cabral was a leading member of the innovative literary movement known as the Clube da Madrugada (Club of the Dawn). The goal of the movement was to bring the "aesthetic innovations of Brazilian modernism to the Amazonian region." As a direct result of the Clube da Madrugada, literature from the Amazonian region of Brazil was brought to the forefront of the national dialogue. In an interview conducted by poet Gerry LaFemina Cabral explained that "in the north the traditional deep roots of Portuguese heritage are stronger than in the south, where a rich industrial life and an intense flow of immigrants have played an important role in modifying and enlarging horizons." Cabral reasons that this is why avant-garde movements such as Brazilian modernism emerged primarily in the south, and why she took it upon herself to bring such movements to the Amazon.

Cabral holds a degree in English from Institute Brazil-United States. In 1962 she joined the faculty of the University of Brasília, but resigned for political reasons following the military coup of 1964. She said that while teaching in Brasília she was hesitant to assign readings that might be too political for the Brazilian dictatorship: "During my classes I was always fearful of spies disguised among the students. The texts we studied had to be chosen with prudence so as not to arouse political suspicions." She decided to depart from the world of academia and for several years she served as a member of her Brazil's diplomatic corps at the Brazilian Embassy in Beirut, Lebanon, and at the Brazilian Consulate in Chicago. With the re-establishment of democracy in 1988, she was able to resume her academic career. In 1996, the author retired from academia to devote herself to her literature. She is currently a professor emeritus of Portuguese Language and Brazilian Literature at the University of Brasília.

== Writing style ==
Cabral's writing is characterized by an emphasis on the flora and fauna of her native region: chiefly, the Amazon river and its surrounding basin. Her hometown has been described as a city "in which nature in an exuberant manner coexisted with urban sophistication." In her 2008 collection Cage (her first book published in English, known as Jaula in Portuguese), she explores the oftentimes overlapping relationship between humans and animals: "The core of the book is the closeness I maintain with the animal world. I put myself on their level, seeing them within me, and when I do view them from the outside, I still am aware that there is something wild or savage in us humans, that we too are predators, and thus I restore our fellowship." Critic Cristina Ferreira Pinto-Bailey writes that by documenting the animals of the Amazon, Cabral "weaves with careful and concise language some insightful observations about the beasts that lie within us." Because of her frequent emphasis on nature, Cabral's writing often showcases her interest in environmental protection and activism.

== Works ==
- Alameda (1963)
- Ponto de cruz (1979)
- Torna-viagem (1981)
- Zé Pirulito (1982)
- Lição de Alice: poemas 1980-1983 (1986)
- Visgo da terra (1986)
- Rês desgarrada: Poemas, 1986-1990 (1994)
- De déu em déu: Poemas reunidos, 1979-1994 (1998)
- Intramuros: Poesia, Governo do Estado do Paraná (1998)
- Rasos d’água (2003)
- Jaula (2008)
- Ante-sala, Bem-Te-Vi (2007).
- Gazing through Water (2021)
