= Valentine Cunningham =

British academic and literary critic

Professor Valentine Cunningham OBE

Professor of English Language and Literature, University of Oxford
- In office 1996–2015

Personal details
- Born: Valentine David Cunningham; 28 October 1944 (age 81)
- Occupation: English language and literature scholar

Valentine David Cunningham (born 28 October 1944) is a retired professor of English language and literature at the University of Oxford, and emeritus fellow in English literature at Corpus Christi College, Oxford.

== Career ==
He graduated in English at Keble College, Oxford (1966), where he was a graduate student (1966–1969). He was a junior research fellow, St John's College, Oxford (1969–1972). He taught English literature from the Elizabethans to the present day as fellow and tutor of Corpus (1972–2012), serving the college variously as dean, senior tutor, tutor for admissions, vice-president, and finally senior research fellow in English literature (2012–2015). He gave university lectures on English literature, literary history and literary theory (1972–2012). He held a personal professorship in English language and literature (2000–2015). He was variously a visiting professor at the University of Massachusetts, Amherst, US; at Konstanz, Germany (where he was Staendiger Gastprofessor, 1994–2002); at Freiburg and Goettingen, Germany. He was scholar in residence, University of Perth, Western Australia (1985). He is a fellow of the Grossbritannien Zentrum, Humboldt University, Berlin, and honorary professor of the University of Bucharest. He has lectured at many universities in the UK and around the world – Ireland, Germany, France, Spain, Portugal, Belgium, Switzerland, Norway, Cyprus, Romania, Croatia, India, Brazil, Chile, Australia, Ghana, the US, and Canada.

He was appointed Officer of the Order of the British Empire (OBE) in the 2017 New Year Honours for services to scholarship and the understanding of the humanities.

He has broadcast frequently for BBC radio, contributing to arts programmes, scripting and presenting features, on literary, musical and cultural-historical topics. He has reviewed widely in newspapers, journals and magazines. He has been a judge for many literary prizes: The Booker, 1992 and 1998; The Commonwealth Writers' Prize, 2001–2002; The International IMPAC Dublin Literary Award, 2015; The DSC Asian Fiction Prize 2017.

== Publications ==
=== Monographs ===
- Everywhere Spoken Against: Dissent in the Victorian Novel (Clarendon Press, Oxford, 1975).
- British Writers of the Thirties (Oxford University Press, 1988).
- In the Reading Gaol: Postmodernity, Texts and History (Blackwell, Oxford, 1994).
- Reading After Theory (Blackwell, Oxford, 2002).
- Victorian Poetry Now: Poets, Poems, Poetics (Wiley-Blackwell, Oxford, 2011).
- King Lear, The Connell Guide (Connell Guides, Chippenham, 2012).

=== Editions ===
- The Penguin Book of Spanish Civil War Verse (Penguin, 1980).
- Spanish Front: Writers on the Civil War (Oxford University Press, 1986).
- Cinco Escritores Britanicos/Five British Writers (Ediciones Turner, Madrid, 1990).
- George Eliot, Adam Bede (Oxford World's Classics, 1996).
- The Victorians: An Anthology of Poetry and Poetics (Blackwell, Oxford, 2000).
- Victorian Poets: A Critical Reader (Wiley-Blackwell, Oxford, 2014).

=== Introductions ===
- Ralph Bates, The Olive Field (Hogarth/Chatto & Windus reprint, 1986), i–viii.
- Virginia Woolf, Mrs Dalloway, ed Jeanette Winterson & Margaret Reynolds (Vintage Classics, Vintage, 2000), xv–xxiii.
- Iris Murdoch, An Accidental Man (Vintage, 2003), vii–xiv.
- Postface, Charles Morgan, Le Passage (Editions Autrement Litteratures, 1996), 273–282.
- The Book of Psalms (The Folio Society, London, 2017), ix–xvii.

=== Articles ===
- "Readers Beside themselves: Particular Pleasures and Generic Controls", Representations of Emotions, ed. J Schlaeger & G Stedman (Narr Tuebingen, 1999), 43–56.
- "Anthony Trollope and Law, Laws, legalisms and Assorted Legislations", REAL, 18, Law and Literature, ed. Brook Thomas (Narr, Tuebingen, 2002), 89–107.
- "Having a Clue ... about Ovid', Symbolism: An International Annual of Critical Aesthetics", Vol 5, ed Ruediger Ahrens (AMS Press, NY, 2005). 102–124.
- "Why Ekphrasis?'. Classical Philology", special issue, ed Shadi Bartsch & Jas Elsner, 102, 1 (Jan 2007), 57–71.
- "Poubellication: in the lexical dunny with the furphy king from down under", Rude Britannia, ed. Mina Gorji (Routledge, London & NY, 2007), 35–55.
- "Bible Reading and/after theory', The Oxford Handbook of the Reception History of the Bible", ed Michael Lieb, Emma Mason & Jonathan Roberts (Oxford University Press, Oxford, 2011), 649–673.
- "Marxist Cricket? Some Versions of Pastoral in the Poetry of the Thirties', Ecology and the Literature of the British Left, The Red and the Green", ed John Rignall & Gustav Klaus, with Valentine Cunningham (Ashgate, Farnham, 2012), 177–191.
- "The Terrors of Madness and Victorian Literary Nosology", Hermeneutics of Textual Madness: Re-Readings of Textual Madness/ Hermeneutiques de la Folie Textuelle: Re-Lectures, ed. MJ Muratore (Schena Editore, Fasan/Alain Baudry et cie, Paris, 2016), I, 389–419.
- "Bunyan's Way of Reading", Essays in Criticism, 64 (4), 2017, 323–354.
