= Philip Ayres (poet) =

British writer (1638–1712)

Philip Ayres (1638–1712), the author of numerous books and pamphlets, flourished in the latter part of the seventeenth century; was born at Cottingham, and educated at Westminster, and St John's College, Oxford. He became tutor in the family of Montague Garrard Drake, of Agmondesham, Bucks, and lived in the family till his death on 1 December 1712. His chief work is his Lyric poems made in imitation of the Italians (1687), a collection of 32 sonnets, original pieces and translations. One copy of verses is addressed to "his honoured friend" John Dryden.

Ayres was one of the only sonneteers active between the ages of Milton and Gray.

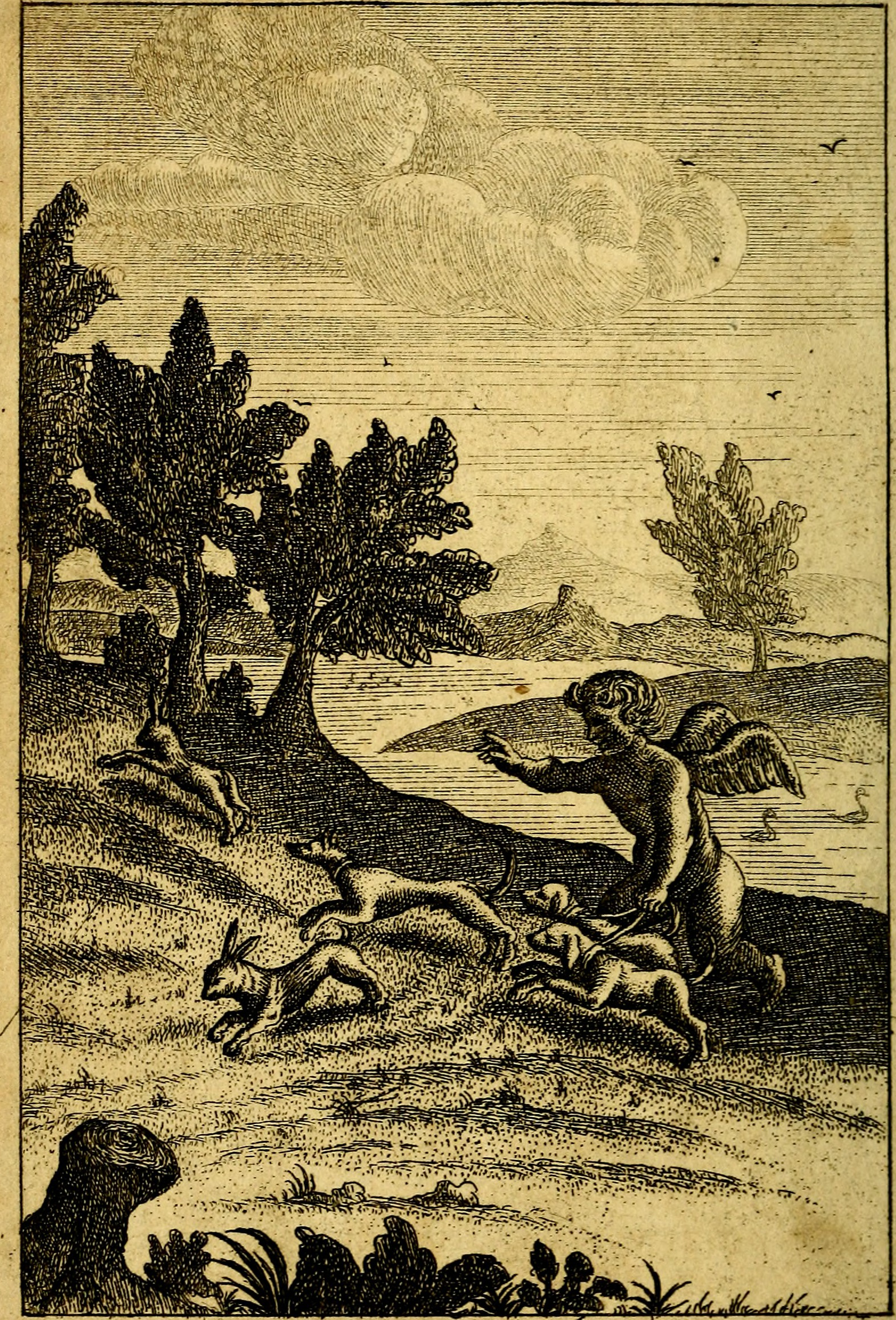
Emblems of love

== Works ==
The following is a list of Ayres's works in chronological order:

- A short Account of the Life and Death of Pope Alexander VII, by P. A. Gent., 1667.
- Pax Redux, or the Christian Reconciler. Done out of the French by P. A., 1670.
- The Fortunate Fool, written in Spanish by A. G. de Salas Barbadillo. Translated by Philip Ayres, Gent., 1670.
- Count Nadasdy's Hungarian Rebellion, translated by P. A. Gent., 1672.
- The Count of Gabalis, 1680, from the French of the Abbe de Montfaucon de Villars.
- Emblemata Amatoria. Emblems of Love. In four languages, Latin, English, Italian, French, 1683.
- The Voyages and Adventures of Captain Barth. Sharp and others in the South Sea, &c., 1684.
- Vox Clamantis, or an Essay for the Honour, Happiness and Prosperity of the English Gentry, 1684.
- Lyric-Poems, made in imitation of the Italians, 1687
- Mythologia Ethica, or Three Centuries of Æsopian Fables in English, 1689.
- The Revengeful Mistress, being an Amorous Adventure of an English Gentleman in Spain, 1696. This prose work is either a short novel or a novella.

== Sources ==
- Letellier, Robert Ignatius (1997), The English Novel, 1660-1700: An Annotated Bibliography, Greenwood Publishing Group, ISBN 978-0313303685

Attribution

This article incorporates text from a publication now in the public domain: "Ayres, Philip". Dictionary of National Biography. London: Smith, Elder & Co. 1885–1900.
