= D. J. Enright =

British novelist, poet, academic, and critic (1920–2002)

- Born: Denis Joseph Enright; 11 March 1920; Royal Leamington Spa, Warwickshire, England, United Kingdom
- Died: 31 December 2002 (aged 82); England, United Kingdom
- Occupations: Academic, poet, novelist, critic
- Writing career
- Language: English
- Genres: Poetry, fiction, essays

Dennis Joseph Enright OBE FRSL (11 March 1920 – 31 December 2002) was a British academic, poet, novelist and critic. He authored the novel Academic Year (1955), an autobiography, Memoirs of a Mendicant Professor (1969), and a wide range of essays, reviews, anthologies, children's books and poems.

== Life ==
Enright was born in Royal Leamington Spa, Warwickshire, to Irish postman father George Enright - a former soldier, "obliged in early life to enlist... as the result of the premature death of his father, a Fenian" - and Welsh chapel-goer mother Grace (née Cleaver). He wrote about his "working-class, Black Country upbringing". Enright stated in his poem "Anglo-Irish" that his "father claimed to be descended from a king called Brian Boru, an ancient hero of Ireland..." but his "mother said that all Irishmen claimed descent from kings but the truth was they were Catholics."

Enright's early life was characterised by poverty, the loss of his father, and relationship with his "overworked mother". He was educated at Clapham Terrace Primary School, Leamington College and Downing College, Cambridge. After graduating he held a number of academic posts outside the United Kingdom: in Egypt, Japan, Thailand and notably in Singapore (from 1960). He at times attributed his lack of success in finding a post closer to home to writing for Scrutiny and his short association with F. R. Leavis; whose influence he mainly and early, but not entirely, rejected.

As a poet he was identified with the Movement. His 1955 anthology, Poets of the 1950s, served to delineate the group of British poets in question – albeit somewhat remotely and retrospectively, since he was abroad and it was not as prominent as the Robert Conquest collection New Lines of the following year. Returning to London in 1970, he edited Encounter magazine, with Melvin J. Lasky, for two years. He subsequently worked in publishing.

== The "Enright Affair" ==
Enright gained some notoriety in Singapore after his inaugural lecture at the University of Singapore on 17 November 1960, titled "Robert Graves and the Decline of Modernism". His introductory remarks on the state of culture in Singapore were the subject of a Straits Times article. "'Hands Off' Challenge to 'Culture Vultures'", the next day. Among other things, he stated that it was important for Singapore and Malaya to remain "culturally open", that culture was something to be left for the people to build up, and that for the government to institute "a sarong culture, complete with pantun competitions and so forth" was futile.

Some quotes include:

Art does not begin in a test-tube, it does not take its origin in good sentiments and clean-shaven, upstanding young thoughts.

Leave the people free to make their own mistakes, to suffer and to discover. Authority must leave us to fight even that deadly battle over whether or not to enter a place of entertainment wherein lurks a juke-box, and whether or not to slip a coin into the machine.

The following day, Enright was summoned by the Ministry for Labour and Law regarding his foreigner work permit, and was handed a letter by the Minister for Culture, S. Rajaratnam, which had also been released to the press. The letter admonished Enright for "involv[ing] [himself] in political affairs which are the concern of local people", not "visitors, including mendicant professors", and said that the government "[has] no time for asinine sneers by passing aliens about the futility of 'sarong culture complete with pantun competitions' particularly when it comes from beatnik professors". There was also some criticism that Enright had been insensitive towards Malays and their so-called "sarong culture".

With some mediation from the Academic Staff Association of the university, it was agreed that to put the matter to rest, Enright would write a letter of apology and clarification, the government would reply, and both were to be printed in the newspapers. Although the affair was "essentially dead" after that, according to Enright, it would still be brought up periodically in discussions of local culture and academic freedom. Enright gave his account of the incident in Memoirs of a Mendicant Professor (pp. 124–151).

== Timeline ==
- 11 March 1920: Born in Warwickshire
- 1947–50: Lecturer in English, University of Alexandria
- 1950–53: Organising Tutor, Extra-Mural Department, Birmingham University
- 1953–56: Visiting Professor, Konan University, Japan
- 1956–67: Visiting Lecturer, Free University of Berlin
- 1967–69: British Council Professor, Chulalongkorn University
- 1960–70: Professor of English, University of Singapore
- 1970–72: Co-Editor, Encounter
- 1974–82: Director, Chatto & Windus
- 1975–80: Honorary Professor of English, University of Warwick
- 1981: Queen's Gold Medal for Poetry
- 1991: OBE
- 31 December 2002: Died in London

== Bibliography ==
=== Poetry ===
Collections

- The Laughing Hyena and other poems (1953)
- Bread Rather than Blossoms (1956), poems
- The Year of the Monkey (1956), poems
- Some Men Are Brothers (1960), poems
- Addictions (1962), poems
- The Old Adam (1965)
- Selected Poems (1968)
- Unlawful Assembly (1968)
- Daughters of Earth (1972), poems
- Foreign Devils (1972), poems
- The Terrible Shears – Scenes from a Twenties Childhood (1973)
- Sad Ires (1975), poems
- Paradise Illustrated (1978), poems (translated into Dutch by C. Buddingh' in 1982 as Het paradijs in beeld in a bilingual edition)
- A Faust Book (1979), poems
- Collected Poems (1981)
- Collected Poems 1987
- Selected Poems 1990, Oxford
- Under the Circumstances: Poems and Prose (1991)
- Old Men and Comets (1993) poems
- Collected Poems: 1948–1998 (1998)

Anthologies (edited)

- Poets of the 1950s (1955)
- The Poetry of Living Japan (1958), editor with Takamichi Ninomiya
- A Choice of Milton's Verse (1975) editor
- Penguin Modern Poets 26 (1975) with Dannie Abse and Michael Longley
- The Oxford Book of Contemporary Verse 1945–1980 (1980), editor

List of poems

Title	Year	First published	Reprinted/collected
A liberal lost	1965	Enright, D. J. (March 1965). "A liberal lost". Meanjin Quarterly. 24 (1): 102.	The Old Adam

- In the Basilica of the Annunciation (1971), broadsheet poem
- The Rebel (1974), poem
- Walking in the Harz Mountains, Faust Senses the Presence of God (1979), poem

=== Novels ===
- Academic Year (1955)
- Heaven Knows Where (1957)
- Insufficient Poppy (1960)
- Figures of Speech (1965 )
- The Joke Shop (1976), novel
- Wild Ghost Chase (1978), novel
- Beyond Land's End (1979), novel

=== Literary criticism, memoirs and general anthologies ===
- A Commentary on Goethe's Faust (1949), translated into Polish by Bohdan Zadura:Ksiega Fausta, Wydawnictwo Lubelskie, Lublin 1984.
- The World of Dew: Aspects of Living Japan (1955)
- The Apothecary's Shop (1957)
- Robert Graves and the Decline of Modernism (1960)
- English Critical Texts 16th Century to 20th Century (1963), editor with Ernst de Chickera
- Conspirators and Poets (1966)
- Memoirs of a Mendicant Professor (1969)
- Shakespeare and the Students (1970)
- Man is an Onion: Reviews and Essays (1972)
- Rhyme times rhyme (1974)
- A Mania for Sentences: Essays on G. Grass, H. Boll, Frisch, Flaubert & Others (1983)
- Fair of Speech: The Uses of Euphemism (1985), editor
- Instant Chronicles: A Life (1985)
- The Oxford Book of Death (1985), editor
- The Alluring Problem – An Essay on Irony (1986)
- Fields of Vision: Essays on Literature, Language, and Television (1988)
- Ill at Ease: Writers on Ailments Real and Imagined (1989), editor
- The Faber Book of Fevers and Frets (1989), editor
- Oxford Book of Friendship (1991), editor with David Rawlinson
- The Way of The Cat (1992)
- The Oxford Book of the Supernatural (1994), editor
- Interplay: A Kind of Commonplace Book (1995)
- Telling Tales (1999)
- Play Resumed: A Journal
- Signs and Wonders: Selected Essays (2001)
- Injury Time (2003)
