= Elizabeth Jennings (poet) =

British poet (1926–2001)

Elizabeth Jennings CBE
- Born: Elizabeth Joan Jennings; 18 July 1926; Skirbeck, Boston, Lincolnshire, England
- Died: 26 October 2001 (aged 75); Bampton, Oxfordshire, England
- Education: St Anne's College, Oxford
- Occupation: Poet
- Awards: Somerset Maugham Award

Elizabeth Joan Jennings (18 July 1926 – 26 October 2001) was a British poet. She won the Somerset Maugham Award in 1955 for her second poetry collection, A Way of Looking.

== Life and career ==
Elizabeth Jennings was born at The Bungalow, Tower Road, Skirbeck, Boston, Lincolnshire, younger daughter of physician Henry Cecil Jennings (1893–1967), MA, BSc (Oxon.), MB BS (Lond.), DPH, medical officer of health for Oxfordshire, and (Helen) Mary, née Turner. When Elizabeth was seven years old, her family moved to Oxford, where she remained for the rest of her life. There, she later attended St Anne's College. After graduation, she became a writer.

It was a yellow voice, a high, shrill treble in the nursery
White always and high, I remember it so,
White cupboard, off-white table, mugs, dolls' faces
And I was four or five. The garden could have been
Miles away. We were taken down to the green
Asparagus beds, the cut lawn, and the smell of it
Comes each summer after rain when white returns. Our bird,
A canary called Peter, sang behind bars. The black and white cat
Curled and snoozed by the fire and danger was far away.

— From "A Bird in the House"
in Collected Poems (Carcanet, 1987)

Jennings's early poetry was published in journals such as Oxford Poetry, New English Weekly, The Spectator, Outposts and Poetry Review, but her first book of poems was not published until she was 27. The lyrical poets she cited as having influenced her were Gerard Manley Hopkins, W. H. Auden, Robert Graves and Edwin Muir. Her second book, A Way of Looking (1955), won the Somerset Maugham Award and marked a turning point, as the prize money allowed her to spend nearly three months in Rome, which was a revelation. It brought a new dimension to her religious belief and inspired her imagination.

Regarded as traditionalist rather than an innovator, Jennings is known for her lyric poetry and mastery of form. Her work displays a simplicity of metre and rhyme shared with Philip Larkin, Kingsley Amis and Thom Gunn, all members of the 1950s group of English poets known as The Movement. She always made it clear that, while her life, which included a spell of severe mental illness, contributed to the themes contained within her work, she did not write explicitly autobiographical poetry. Her deeply held Roman Catholicism coloured much of her work.

She had difficulty managing the practical aspects of her career and life. She became impoverished and struggled with mental health, and her personal difficulties tarnished her critical reputation. When she was honoured by the queen in 1992, Jennings wore a "knitted hat, duffle coat, and canvas shoes". The tabloid newspapers mocked her as "the bag-lady of the sonnets", and the unfortunate description stayed with her.

Jennings spent the later years of her life in various short-term lodgings and in Unity House (8 St Andrew's Lane) in Old Headington. She died in a care home in Bampton, Oxfordshire, at the age of 75. She is buried in Wolvercote Cemetery, Oxford.

Her life and career were reviewed in 2018 by Dana Gioia, who said: "Despite her worldly failures, her artistic career was a steady course of achievement. Jennings ranks among the finest British poets of the second half of the twentieth century. She is also England's best Catholic poet since Gerard Manley Hopkins."

The first biography of Jennings was published by Oxford University Press in 2018, entitled Elizabeth Jennings: The Inward War, written by Dana Greene.

== Selected honours and awards ==
- 1953: Arts Council of Great Britain Prize for the best first book of poems for Poems
- 1955: Somerset Maugham Award for A Way of Looking.
- 1966: Richard Hillary Memorial Prize for The Mind has Mountains
- 1987: W.H. Smith Literary Award for Collected Poems 1953–1985
- 1992: Commander of the Order of the British Empire (CBE)
- 2001: Honorary Doctorate of Divinity from Durham University

== Publications ==
=== Poetry collections ===
- Poems. Oxford: Fantasy Press, 1953
- A Way of Looking. London: André Deutsch, 1955
- A Sense of the World. London: André Deutsch, 1958
- Song For a Birth or a Death. London: André Deutsch, 1961
- The Sonnets of Michelangelo (translated by Jennings). London: Folio Society, 1961; revised edition, Allison & Busby, 1969. Edited by Michael Ayrton, Carcanet Press, 2003.
- Recoveries. London: André Deutsch, 1964
- The Mind has Mountains. London: Macmillan, 1966
- The Secret Brother and Other Poems for Children. London: Macmillan, 1966
- Collected Poems 1967. London: Macmillan, 1967
- The Animals' Arrival. London: Macmillan, 1969
- Lucidities. London: Macmillan, 1970
- Relationships. London: Macmillan, 1972
- Growing Points. Cheadle: Carcanet, 1975
- Consequently I Rejoice. Cheadle: Carcanet, 1977
- After the Ark. Oxford University Press, 1978
- Selected Poems. Cheadle: Carcanet, 1979
- Winter Wind. Sidcot: Gruffyground Press, 1979
- Moments of Grace. Manchester: Carcanet, 1980
- Celebrations and Elegies. Manchester: Carcanet, 1982
- Extending the Territory. Manchester: Carcanet, 1985
- In Shakespeare's Company. The Celandine Press, 1985 [limited edition 250 copies]
- Collected Poems 1953-1985. Manchester: Carcanet, 1986
- An Oxford Cycle: Poems. Oxford:Thornton's, 1987
- Tributes. Manchester: Carcanet, 1989
- Times and Seasons. Manchester: Carcanet, 1992
- Familiar Spirits. Manchester: Carcanet, 1994
- In the Meantime. Manchester: Carcanet, 1996
- A Spell of Words: Selected Poems for Children. London: Macmillan, 1997
- Praises. Manchester: Carcanet, 1998
- Timely Issues. Manchester: Carcanet, 2001
- New Collected Poems. Manchester: Carcanet, 2001
- Elizabeth Jennings: The Collected Poems. Manchester: Carcanet, 2012
- Father to Son: Poem

=== Selections and anthologies edited by Jennings ===
- The Batsford Book of Children's Verse (illustrated). London: Batsford, 1958
- An Anthology of Modern Verse: 1940-1960. London: Methuen, 1961
- Wuthering Heights and Selected Poems by Emily Brontë. London: Pan Books, 1967
- A Choice of Christina Rossetti's Verse. London: Faber and Faber, 1970
- The Batsford Book of Religious Verse. London: Batsford, 1981
- A Poet's Choice. Manchester: Carcanet, 1996

=== Criticism ===
- "The Difficult Balance". London Magazine 6.9 (1959): 27–30
- "The Restoration of Symbols: The Poetry of David Gascoyne". Twentieth Century 165 (June 1959): 567–577
- Let's Have Some Poetry! (for children). London: Museum Press, 1960
- "Poetry and Mysticism: on re-reading Bremond". Dublin Review 234 (1960): 84–91
- "The Unity of Incarnation: a study of Gerard Manley Hopkins". Dublin Review 234 (1960): 170–184
- Every Changing Shape: Mystical Experience and the Making of Poems. London: André Deutsch, 1961; Manchester: Carcanet, 1996, ISBN 978-1-85754-247-9
- Poetry Today (British Council and National British League). London: Longmans, Green and Co., 1961
- "Emily Dickinson and the Poetry of the Inner Life". Review of English Literature 3.2 (April 1962): 78–87
- Frost (Robert Frost). Edinburgh: Oliver and Boyd, 1964
- Christianity and Poetry. London: Burns & Oates, 1965
- Reaching into Silence: a study of eight twentieth-century visionaries. New York: Barnes & Noble, 1974
- Seven Men of Vision: an appreciation. London: Visa Press, 1976
- "The State of Poetry". Agenda 27.3 (Autumn 1989): 40–41
