= Christopher Harvey (poet) =

English clergyman and poet

Christopher Harvey (1597–1663) was an English clergyman and poet.

== Life ==
The son of the Rev. Christopher Harvey of Bunbury, Cheshire and his wife Ellen (Helen), he came from a Puritan background, his father's associates including William Hinde, Samuel Torshell and John Bruen. He was a batler of Brasenose College, Oxford, in 1613, and graduated B.A. 19 May 1617, becoming M.A. 1 February 1620. In 1630 he was rector of Whitney, Herefordshire; at Michaelmas 1632 he became head-master of Kington grammar school, but he seems to have returned to Whitney on or before the following 25 March, when a new head-master was appointed.

On 14 November 1639 Harvey was instituted to the vicarage of Clifton on Dunsmore, Warwickshire. He owed this preferment to his patron Sir Robert Whitney, according to a dedicatory epistle to Whitney in his edition of Thomas Pierson's Excellent Encouragements against Afflictions, 1647. His widowed mother had married Pierson.

Harvey was buried at Clifton on 4 April 1663.

== Works ==
Harvey was the author of The Synagogue, a series of devotional poems appended anonymously to the 1640 edition of George Herbert's The Temple, and reprinted with most of its later editions. The Synagogue is a derivative imitation of Herbert.

In 1647 Harvey issued anonymously Schola Cordis, or the Heart of it Selfe gone away from God; brought back againe to him; and instructed by him. In 47 Emblems; 2nd edition 1664; 3rd edition 1675. The volume has on the title-page "By the Author of the Synagogue". The emblems were adapted from Benedictus van Haeften's Schola Cordis. This work was a free adaptation, with the engravings made freshly and reversed. It was later reissued as The School of the Heart, and wrongly attributed to Francis Quarles.

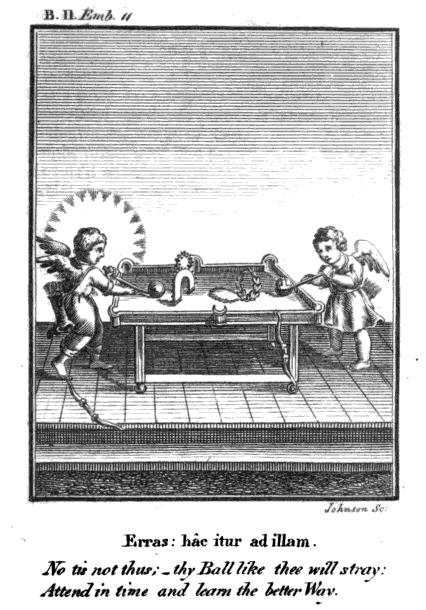
Emblem from an 1808 edition of The School of the Heart

Harvey also published Ἀφηνιαστής. The Right Rebel. A Treatise discovering the true Use of the Name by the Nature of Rebellion, 1661 (reissue Faction Supplanted: or a Caveat against the ecclesiastical and secular Rebels 1663); it was mostly written in 1642 and finished on 3 April 1645. A related polemical work was Self-Contradiction Censured, or, A Caveat Against Inconstancy (1662). Anthony Wood attributed to Harvey a book called Conditions of Christianity.

Harvey was a friend of Izaak Walton, and prefixed commendatory verses to the Compleat Angler, ed. 1655. The fourth edition of The Synagogue has commendatory verses by Walton, who also quoted one of its poems in the 1655 edition of the Angler.

== Family ==
By his wife Margaret Harvey had nine children. Between 1630 and 1639 five of them were baptised at Whitney; the others at Clifton.

== Notes ==
Attribution

This article incorporates text from a publication now in the public domain: "Harvey, Christopher". Dictionary of National Biography. London: Smith, Elder & Co. 1885–1900.
