= The Movement (literature) =

1950s English literary movement

The Movement was a term coined in 1954 by J. D. Scott, literary editor of The Spectator, to describe a group of writers including Philip Larkin, Kingsley Amis, Donald Davie, D. J. Enright, John Wain, Elizabeth Jennings, Thom Gunn and Robert Conquest. The Movement was quintessentially English in character; poets from other parts of the United Kingdom were not involved.

== Description ==
Although considered a literary group, members of the Movement saw themselves more as an actual literary movement, with each writer sharing a common purpose. To these poets, good poetry meant simple, sensuous content and traditional, conventional and dignified form.

The Movement's importance includes its worldview, which took into account the collapse of the British Empire and the United Kingdom's drastically reduced power and influence over world geo-politics. The group's objective was to prove the importance of traditional English poetry, over the American-led innovations of modernist poetry. The members of the Movement were not anti-modernity but they were opposed to modernist literature, which was reflected in the Englishness of their poetry.

The Movement sparked the divisions among different types of British poetry. Their poems were nostalgic for an older England and filled with rural images of the decaying way of life in the villages as the English people moved away from the countryside and into urban ghettoization.

== Representative collections ==
The Movement produced two anthologies, Poets of the 1950s (edited by D. J. Enright, published in Japan, 1955) and New Lines (edited by Robert Conquest, 1956). Conquest, who edited the New Lines anthology, described the connection between the poets as "little more than a negative determination to avoid bad principles". These 'bad principles' are usually described as "excess", both in terms of theme and stylistic devices. Poets in New Lines included Enright, Conquest, Kingsley Amis, Donald Davie, Thom Gunn, John Holloway, Elizabeth Jennings, Philip Larkin and John Wain.

The polemical introduction to New Lines particularly targeted the 1940s poets and especially denounced the literary legacy of Dylan Thomas, whom the Movement poets believed embodied, "everything they detested: verbal obscurity, metaphysical pretentiousness, and romantic rhapsodizing."

In 1963, a sequel to the original New Lines anthology, titled New Lines 2, was published. It included many of the authors from the original anthology, as well as younger English poets like Thomas Blackburn, Edwin Brock, Hilary Corke, John Fuller, Ted Hughes, Edward Lucie-Smith, Anthony Thwaite and Hugo Williams.

== Decline ==
The "Angry Young Men" movement occurred in 1956 during the turning point of the Movement. David Lodge attributed the Movement's decline to the publication of the New Lines anthology. After these events, the Movement became less exclusive. Members were no longer required to fight and defend one another's work, for they had become accepted members of the literary world.

The Movement was succeeded in the 1960s by "The Group", whose members included Philip Hobsbaum, Alan Brownjohn, Adrian Mitchell, Peter Porter, Edward Lucie-Smith, George MacBeth, Ian Hamilton's Review school and Michael Horovitz's "Children of Albion". The Group was similar to the Movement; they shared similar ideas about the form and seriousness of modernist poetry.
