= Donald Davie =

English poet and critic (1922–1995)

Donald Davie FBA
- Born: 17 July 1922; Barnsley, Yorkshire, England
- Died: 18 September 1995 (aged 73); Exeter, England
- Education: St Catharine's College, Cambridge (B.A., M.A. and Ph.D.)
- Occupations: Poet and literary critic
- Movement: Movement

Donald Alfred Davie, FBA (17 July 1922 – 18 September 1995) was an English Movement poet, and literary critic. His poems in general are philosophical and abstract, but often evoke various landscapes.

== Biography ==
Davie was born in Barnsley, Yorkshire, England, a son of Baptist parents. He began his education at Barnsley Holgate Grammar School, and then attended St Catharine's College, Cambridge, to study English on a scholarship, beating his future Movement associate Kingsley Amis in the process. His studies there were interrupted by service during the war in the Royal Navy in Arctic Russia, where he taught himself the language. In the last year of the war, in Devon, he married Doreen John.

Davie returned to Cambridge in 1946 and received his B.A., M.A. and Ph.D. He was a fellow of Trinity College Dublin from 1954 to 1957, and then a fellow of Gonville and Caius College, Cambridge from 1959 until 1964.

In 1964, Davie was made the first Professor of English at the new University of Essex. He taught English there until 1968, when he moved to Stanford University, succeeding Yvor Winters. In 1978, Davie relocated to Vanderbilt University, where he taught until his retirement in 1988.

He often wrote on the technique of poetry, both in books such as Purity of Diction in English Verse, and in smaller articles such as "Some Notes on Rhythm in Verse". Davie's criticism and poetry are both characterized by his interest in modernist and pre-modernist techniques. Davie argued that "there is no necessary connection between the poetic vocation on the one hand, and on the other exhibitionism, egoism, and licence". He writes eloquently and sympathetically about British modernist poetry in Under Briggflatts, while in Thomas Hardy and British Poetry he defends a pre-modernist verse tradition. Much of Davie's poetry has been compared to that of the traditionalist Philip Larkin, but other works are more influenced by Ezra Pound. Davie is featured in the Oxford Book of Contemporary Verse (1980).

In the 1960s, Davie was a conduit between the Cambridge poets and the Black Mountain poets. Irish literary critic Denis Donoghue described Davie's poetry as "an enforced choice between masturbation and happily wedded love" bereft of drama.

Davie delivered the 1990 Warton Lecture on English Poetry. He died of cancer at the Royal Devon and Exeter Hospital in Exeter in September 1995.

Writer Calvin Bedient discusses Davie's style in his book Eight Contemporary Poets. Bedient informs readers of Davie's specific thoughts by including quotes. According to Bedient, Davie said: "To make poetry out of moral commonplace, a poet has to make it clear that he speaks not in his own voice (that would be impertinent) but as the spokesman of a social tradition." It follows that Davie's voice is unique compared to the modern movement that was happening during his life. His work does not epitomize contemporary poetry like that of many of his counterparts, but rather it calls upon a certain nostalgia for the past. Davie's work is distinctly "English" sounding, as he uses English phrases and traditional language. In particular, his work often reminds readers of the late Augustan poets, whose work is sophisticated and polished. He writes in a similar style to Philip Larkin and Ted Hughes, who were both alive during Davie's lifetime. In addition, Davie writes without fear of criticism. He uses a strong and confident voice to assert his thoughts and musings.

== Works ==
- Brides of Reason: A Selection of Poems (Fantasy Press, 1955)
- Articulate Energy: An Inquiry into the syntax of English Poetry (Routledge and Kegan Paul, 1955)
- A Winter Talent and Other Poems (Routledge and Kegan Paul, 1957)
- The Forests of Lithuania (The Marvell Press, 1959), adapted from Adam Mickiewicz's Pan Tadeusz
- New and Selected Poems (Wesleyan University Press, 1961)
- Events & Wisdoms (Routledge and Kegan Paul, 1964)
- Ezra Pound: Poet As Sculptor (Routledge and Kegan Paul, 1964)
- Essex Poems (Routledge & Kegan Paul, 1969)
- Thomas Hardy and British Poetry (Oxford University Press, 1972)
- The Shires (Oxford University Press, 1974)
- Ezra Pound (Penguin Books, 1976)
- The Poet In The Imaginary Museum, Essays of Two Decades (Carcanet Press, 1977)
- In the Stopping Train and other poems (Carcanet Press, 1977)
- Selected Poems (Carcanet Press, 1985)
- Across the Bay (Carcanet Press, 1986)
- Trying To Explain (Carcanet Press, 1986)
- To Scorch Or Freeze (Carcanet Press, 1988)
- Under Briggflatts (Carcanet Press, 1989)
- Slavic Excursions (Carcanet Press, 1990)
- These the Companions (Carcanet Press, 1990)
- Studies in Ezra Pound (Carcanet Press, 1991)
- Older Masters (Carcanet Press, 1992)
- Purity of Diction in English Verse and Articulate Energy (Carcanet Press, 1994)
- Church Chapel and the Unitarian Conspiracy (Carcanet Press, 1995)
- Poems & Melodramas (Carcanet Press, 1996)
- With The Grain: Essays on Thomas Hardy and British Poetry (Carcanet Press, 1998)
- Two Ways Out of Whitman:American Essays (Carcanet Press, 2000)
- Collected Poems (Carcanet Press, 2002)
- A Travelling Man: Eighteenth Century Bearings(Carcanet Press, 2003)
- Modernist Essays(Carcanet Press, 2004)
- Purity of Diction in English Verse and Articulate Energy (Carcanet Press, 2006)
