= Agenda (poetry journal) =

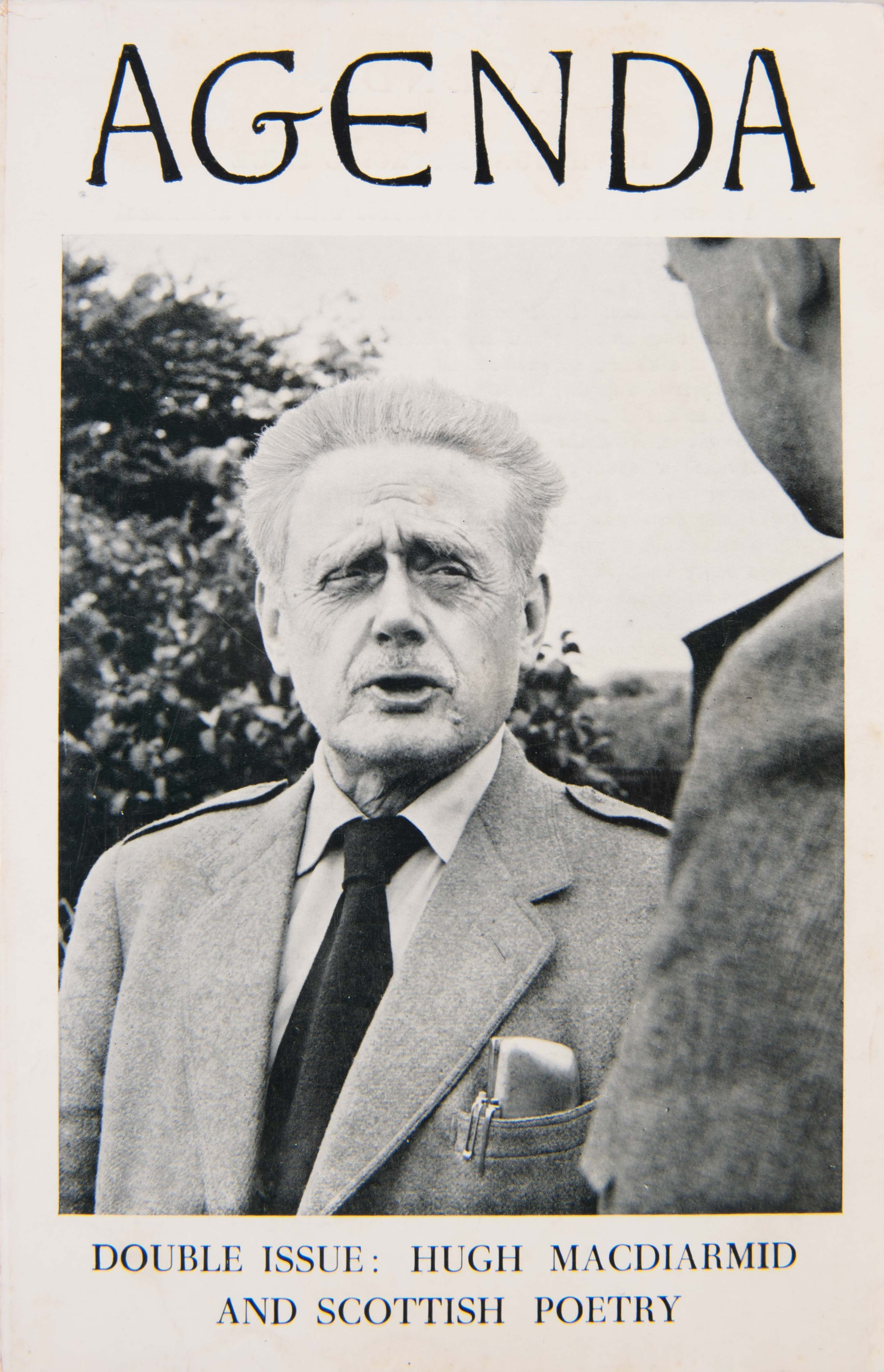
- Vol 5 special issue on Hugh MacDiarmid (published 1966)
- Discipline: Poetry, literary journal
- Language: English
- Edited by: Patricia McCarthy

Publication details
- History: 1959 to present
- Publisher: Agenda and Editions Charitable Trust (United Kingdom)
- Frequency: Quarterly

Standard abbreviations
- ISO 4: Agenda

Indexing
- ISSN: 0002-0796

Links
- Journal homepage

Agenda is a literary journal published in London and founded by William Cookson. Agenda Editions is an imprint of the journal operating as a small press.

== History and editorial orientation ==
Agenda was started in 1959, after Cookson had met Ezra Pound in Italy the previous year. Pound had originally suggested that Cookson edit pages in an existing publication, but when these plans did not come to fruition, the bookseller and poet Peter Russell suggested that Cookson found his own magazine. Agenda was edited with Peter Dale and then Patricia McCarthy, who continues to edit the journal following Cookson's death in 2003.

The editorial preoccupations of Agenda reflected Cookson's own passions. The journal continued to champion Pound long after the poet's death. A "Special Issue in Honour of Ezra Pound's Eighty-Fifth Birthday" (Vol. 8, Nos. 3–4) was a significant early issue of the journal in 1970, and a special issue on "Dante, Ezra Pound and Contemporary Poetry" (Vol. 34, Nos. 3–4) was published as late as 1996.

Cookson also used Agenda to promote the reputation of David Jones, devoting two major special issues to him (in 1967 and 1974) in addition to articles in several other issues. Agenda Editions published several major Jones volumes. These included The Kensington Mass (1975, published with a photographic reproduction of the manuscript) and The Roman Quarry (1981), a full-length volume of until then unpublished material. Agenda Editions published volumes of Jones's letters in 1979 and 1996.

Agenda is also notable for its focus upon the art of translation. Recent issues include "Translation as Metamorphosis" in 2005 (Vol. 4, No. 4).

In March 2023 McCarthy announced in the double issue 'Stepping Stones' (vol. 55 no. 3-4), that she would be stepping down from the editorship of the journal following its takeover by the University of St. Andrews, and the baton of editorship was passed to John Burnside. Burnside's illness and death a year later meant the 2024 edition never emerged, after which the University announced it would close the magazine rather than recruit a new editor, or cede the magazine to a new home.

== Agenda: An Anthology 1959-1993 (1994) ==
Poets, translators and reviewers included were:

- Michael Alexander
- W. H. Auden
- Jonathan Barker
- John Bayley
- William Bedford
- Anne Beresford
- Heather Buck
- Basil Bunting
- Stanley Burnshaw
- John Cayley
- Humphrey Clucas
- William Cookson
- Arthur Cooper
- Peter Dale
- Donald Davie
- Peter Dent
- Ronald Duncan
- T. S. Eliot
- Thom Gunn
- Donald Hall
- Michael Hamburger
- Ian Hamilton
- Seamus Heaney
- David Heidenstam
- A. L. Hendriks
- Geoffrey Hill
- Peter Jay
- Roland John
- David Jones
- Peter Levi
- Saunders Lewis
- Eddie Linden
- Edward Lowbury
- Robert Lowell
- Patricia McCarthy
- Hugh MacDiarmid
- Seán Mac Falls
- Jean MacVean
- Eve Machin
- Sylvia Mann
- Virginia Maskell
- Alan Massey
- Ruth Mead
- Matthew Mead
- Moelwyn Merchant
- W. S. Milne
- Marianne Moore
- George Oppen
- Alan Neame
- Pénélope Palmer
- Rachel Pelham Burn
- Stuart Piggott
- Ezra Pound
- Kathleen Raine
- Norman Rea

Theodore Roethke

- David Rokeah
- Peter Russell
- N. K. Sandars
- Tom Scott
- C. H. Sisson
- W. D. Snodgrass
- Henry Swabey
- R. S. Thomas
- Charles Tomlinson
- Peter Whigham
- Julie Whitby
- William Carlos Williams
- Caroline Wright
- Louis Zukofsky
