= Peter Russell (poet) =

British poet, translator, & critic (1921–2003)

- Irwin Peter Russell
- Born: 16 September 1921; Bristol, England
- Died: 22 January 2003 (aged 81); San Giovanni Valdarno, Italy
- Occupation: Poet
- Spouse(s): Marjorie Keeling-Bloxam (1951–1963); Lana Sue Long

Irwin Peter Russell (16 September 1921 – 22 January 2003) was a British poet, translator and critic. He spent the first half of his life—apart from war service—based in Kent and London, being the proprietor of a series of bookshops, editing the influential literary magazine Nine and being part of the literary scene. Bankruptcy and divorce led to several years of travel which took him to Berlin, Venice, British Columbia and Iran, amongst other places. After the Iranian Revolution he settled permanently in Italy, where he spent the rest of his life. He lived in considerable financial hardship and throughout all he lived a life dedicated to poetry. His work never became mainstream, but it is highly regarded in some circles.

== Biography ==
Russell was born in Bristol and educated at Malvern College. During World War II he served in the Royal Artillery as an intelligence officer in India and Burma, he left the army with the rank of major. After the war, he studied English at Queen Mary College, London. He left without taking a degree.

In 1948 Russell set up an "Ezra Pound Circle" which met once a fortnight in a London pub. Arthur V. Moore encouraged him, passing on advice from Pound: "E.P. thinks you might do as he used to half a century ago ... arrange to be at a given eating place at a given hour each week ... It must be cheap enough so anyone can afford it, and at a place where such a gathering would be made comfortable." That summer Russell went to Italy and met Olga Rudge at Siena, met Pound's friend John Drummond in Rome, and visited Rapallo where he met D. D. Paige who was staying in Pound's old flat engaged in the arduous task of compiling the first selection of Pound's letters.

In 1951 Russell married Marjorie Keeling-Bloxam. Her brother-in-law was Albion Harman, son of the self-proclaimed King of Lundy, the largest island in the Bristol Channel. In the 1950s Russell often visited Lundy, and enjoyed bird-watching there.

In 1949 Russell founded the literary magazine Nine (named after the Nine Muses) which in its eleven issues published many notable poets including George Barker, Basil Bunting, Roy Campbell, Ronald Duncan, Paul Eluard, William Empson, David Gascoyne, Robert Graves, Michael Hamburger. The following year he started The Pound Press. Russell published work by Pound's friends, An Examination of Ezra Pound (1950), but also the first English translations of Mandelstam, Pasternak and Borges. Russell ran the Grosvenor Bookshop in Tunbridge Wells from 1951 to 1959. Both Nine and the Pound Press ceased operation in 1956, and later that year Russell met the young William Cookson and in 1958 introduced him to Krystyna and Czesław Bednarczyk of The Poets' and Painters' Press and suggested that Cookson found his own journal, which was to be the long-running Agenda. Russell introduced him to the works of Hugh MacDiarmid and Tom Scott. Cookson saw Agenda as in part a continuation of what Russell had done with Nine. In 1995 Agenda brought out one of its dedicated issues: 'A Tribute to Peter Russell'.

In 1959 the Grosvenor Bookshop went out of business, and he opened the Gallery Bookshop in Soho, London. He finally went bankrupt in 1963 and with the collapse of his marriage, he moved to Berlin. In 1965 he relocated to Venice. He had rooms in the Campo de la Bragola.

In the mid-1970s he held a writing fellowship as poet in residence at the University of Victoria in British Columbia, where he met his second wife, Lana Sue Long, who was around 30 years his junior. Two daughters, Kathleen and Sara, were born to the couple in 1975 and 1976. After leaving Canada, the family moved to Tehran, where Russell taught and studied at the Imperial Academy of Philosophy. Their third child, a son, Peter George, was born there in 1977. They remained in Iran until the 1979 revolution, when they returned to Italy, where they lived together under considerable financial hardship. In 1989 Lana returned with the three children to North America, settling in Jackpot, Nevada, and the couple divorced in the 1990s. Tuscany was Russell's home for the last forty years of his life. In 1983 he moved into an old mill – "La Turbina" – in Pian di Scò, in the Valdarno near Arezzo. Life at the mill was rudimentary, and there was hardly any furniture, although there were thousands of books in a variety of languages, and a supply of whisky and cigarettes. Russell essentially lived in the kitchen, the most habitable and only warm room of the house.

From 1990 he began editing the Marginalia Newsletter, which appeared alternately in English (odd numbered issues) and Italian (even numbered issues). In the early 1990s he began working with his son, now a teenager, on the translations in his bilingual collections of his poems.

In April 2001 serious health problems associated with a gastric ulcer led to three months in hospital, followed by a further three months in a sanatorium for the elderly. Around this time he became effectively completely blind.

Russell translated varied works from several European languages, he also worked in Persian and Arabic; he was the first English translator of Osip Mandelstam. His close friends included Kathleen Raine and Leonello Rabatti. He was a cousin of Bertrand Russell

He died in the hospital at San Giovanni Valdarno, only 15 minutes or so by car from Pian di Scò.

== Work ==
Dana Gioia has described Russell as "a poet of striking contradictions. He is an immensely learned writer with an anti-academic temperament, a Modernist bewitched by classicism, a polyglot rooted in demotic English, an experimentalist in love with strict traditional forms, a natural democrat suspicious of the Left, and a mystic committed to clarity."

== Works ==
=== Poetry ===
- Picnic to the Moon, The Fortune Press, London, 1944
- Omens and Elegies, Hand and Flower Press, Aldington, 1951
- Descent, (private edition), Tunbridge Wells, 1952
- Three Elegies of Quintilius, The Pound Press, Tunbridge Wells, 1954
- Images of desire, Gallery Bookshop, London, 1962
- Dreamland and Drunkenness, Gallery Bookshop, London, 1963
- Complaints to Circe, London, 1963
- The Spirit and the Body. An Orphic Poem, Keepsake Press, London, 1963
- Visions and Ruins, St. Albert's Press, Aylesford, Kent, 1964
- Agamemnon in Hades, St. Albert's Press, Aylesford, Kent, 1965
- The Golden Chain: Lyrical Poems 1964–1969, (private edition) Venice, 1970
- Paysages Légendaires, Enitharmon Press, London, 1971
- The Elegies of Quintilius, Anvil Press, London, 1975 & 1996
- Ephemeron. A Commonplace Book. An Epic Poem, Lafayette, Indiana (USA), 1977
- Theories, Crescent Moon Press, Teheran (Iran), 1977
- Act of Recognition: Four Visionary Poems, Golgonooza Press, Ipswich, 1978
- Malice Aforethought or the Tumor in the Brain. Epigrammata, University of Salzburg, 1981
- Elemental Discourses, University of Salzburg, 1981
- Africa: A Dream, private edition, Venice, 1981
- All for the Wolves: Selected Poems 1947–1975, Anvil Press Poetry, London, 1984 and Black Swan, Redding Ridge, Connecticut, 1984
- Quintilii Apocalypseos Fragmenta, Agenda Editions, London, 1986
- Teorie e Altre Liriche, Carlo Mancosu Editore, Rome, 1990
- Metameipseis Noerai, or Intellectual Transformations, Agenda Editions, London, 1991
- Pratomagno. Nine Poems, private bilingual edition, translated by Pier Franco Donovan and the author, Pian di Scò, 1992, reprinted 1994
- The Pound Connection in some poems, mainly uncollected or unpublished, private edition, Pian di Scò, 1992
- A Progress of the Soul – Un progresso dell'anima – Five Poems, Pian di Scò, 1992 (private edition) reprinted in 1993 as a bilingual edition translated by Pier Franco Donovan and the author
- Le Poesie di Manuela, private bilingual edition, Pian di Scò, 1992
- Fiddlesticks – Legnetti per il fuoco – Quintilii Apocalypseos Fragmenta, private bilingual edition, translated by Pier Franco Donovan and the author, Pian di Scò, 1992
- The Duller Olive: Early poems uncollected or previously unpublished 1942–1959, University of Salzburg, 1993
- Nove Poemi/Nine longer poems, private bilingual edition, translated by Pier Franco Donovan and the author, Pian di Scò, 1993
- A False Start: London Poems 1959–1963, University of Salzburg, 1993
- Due Poesie del ritorno – Two Poems of Return, private bilingual edition, translated by Pier Franco Donovan and the author, Pian di Scò, 1993
- Ten Days at Neumarkt, private edition, Pian di Scò, 1993
- Some Poems, private edition, Pian di Scò, 1993
- Sonnet, private edition, Pian di Scò, 1993
- Africa. Un sogno – A dream, private bilingual edition, translated by Peter George Russell and the author, Pian di Scò, 1993
- 50 Gedichte von Peter Russell: zweisprachige Ausgabe. Deutsche Ueberstzungen von Charles Stunzi, private bilingual edition, Pian di Scò, 1994
- Berlin-Tegel 1964: Poems and Translations, University of Salzburg, 1994
- My wild heart – Il mio cuore selvaggio, private bilingual edition, preface by Leonello Rabatti, translated by Pier Franco Donovan and the author, Pian di Scò, 1994–1996
- Venice poems 1965, University of Salzburg, 1995
- Three quests – Tre cerche, private bilingual edition, translated by Peter George Russell & Leonello Rabatti, Pian di Scò, 1995
- More for the wolves, University of Salzburg, 1997
- Omens and elegies – Descent – Visions and ruins – Agamemnon in Hades, University of Salzburg, 1997
- From the apocalypse of Quintilius – Selected and introduced by Glyn Pursglove, University of Salzburg, 1997
- Paysages legéndaires and acts of recognition, University of Salzburg, 1997
- Towards an unknown life – LI Sonnets, Bellowing Ark Press, Seattle, Washington (USA), 1997
- Language & the spirit in age of Antichrist, Temenos Academy, London, 1997
- My wild heart, University of Salzburg, 1998
- La Catena d'oro – The Golden Chain, bilingual edition, preface by Giuseppe Conte, translated by Peter George Russell, Pier Franco Donovan & the author, Paideia, Firenze, 1998
- Sei poesie recenti – Six recent poems, Edizioni De Filippis, translated by Peter George Russell, Arezzo, 1998
- Considerazioni sul Fragmentum Filippinum 2993 (Quintilii Elegidion e Villa in Tuscis) – Vitam Reddere ad Asses, Edizioni De Filippis, Arezzo, 1998
- Poesie dal Valdarno – Poems, bilingual edition, translated by Peter George Russell, Pier Franco Donovan, Roberto Marchi & the author, preface by Franco Loi, Pietro Chegai Editore, Florence, 1999
- Effetti di luce ed altre poesie – Effects of light, bilingual edition, translated by Peter George Russell & the author, Edizioni Dialogolibri, Como 1999
- Sonnets – A provisional text January–August 1999, private edition, Pian di Scò, 1999
- La sorgente prosciugata – The dried-up spring, bilingual edition translated by Peter Gorge Russell & the author, Edizioni Eva, Venafro (IS), 2000
- Sonetti – Settembre-Ottobre 1998 – Al fumo delle candele, translated by Peter George Russell & the author, Salvatore Sciascia Editore, Caltanissetta-Rome, 2000
- Albae meditatio, poemetto, translated by the author & Pier Franco Donovan, edizioni Noialtri, Messina, 2000
- Sonetti – Autunno 1998, private bilingual edition, translated by Peter George Russell & the author, Pian di Scò, 2000
- Metameipseis Noerai, o delle trasformazioni intellettuali – Metameipseis Noerai, or intellectual transformations, translated by Roberto Marchi, La bottega di poesia Fernando Pessoa, Anno IX, n. 42, Novembre 2001, Sesto San Giovanni (MI),
- Scalare l'Olimpo – Scaling Olympus, bilingual edition, preface by Brandisio Andolfi, translated by Peter George Russell, Pier Franco Donovan & the author Pietro Chegai Editore, Florence, 2001
- A Savannah da nonno Peter, translated by Peter George Russell, Joseph Canzio & the author, Edizioni De Filippis, Arezzo, 2001
- Autumn to autumn (Sonetti 1997–1998), bilingual edition, preface by Enrica Salvaneschi, translated by Peter George Russell & the author, Edizioni Il Foglio, Piombino, 2002
- Long evening shadows – Le lunghe ombre della sera, 16 poesie tradotte da Franca Alaimo, Edizioni Il Foglio, Piombino, 2002
- Living death – Vivere la morte, bilingual edition, preface and translation by Franca Alaimo, Paideia, Florence, 2002
- This is not my hour. Studio e traduzione dai "Sonnets" bilingual edition, translation by Raffaello Bisso, edizioni del Foglio Clandestino, Sesto San Giovanni (MI), 2010.

=== Prose ===
- Preliminary notes on the political and economic ideas of Ezra Pound, private edition, London, 1948
- "Elements or ingredients of poetry" and "Imagination": two addresses on poetry, private edition, Pian di Scò, 1991
- 'Ezra Pound and the cantos' – lecture given at the British Council, Naples, edition private Pian di Scò, 1991
- Vision in the poetry of Ezra Pound or, Ezra Pound and the invisible, private edition, Pian di Scò, 1991
- Ezra Pound, great poet, great friend, conference held at the Petrarch Academy of Arezzo 20 March 1991, private edition, Pian di Scò 1991
- Dante and Islam, private edition, Terranuova Bracciolini, 1991
- Five addresses on poetry, private edition, Pian di Scò, 1991
- Tolkien and the Imagination, private edition, Pian di Scò, 1991
- Kossovo like cosmic symbol – a speech given in occasion of the encounter of October of the union of the writers of the Republic of Serbia, Belgrade 1989, private edition, Pian di Scò, 1991
- The image of woman as a figure of the Spirit, Four lectures given at the Carl Gustav Jung Institute, Zurigo, 1991, private edition, Pian di Scò, 1991, then published in editions of the University of Salzburg, 1992
- Celestial assumption: four conferences on Dante and Islam, private edition, Pian di Scò, 1992
- Dante and Islam – a general introduction, four conferences held in 1991, private edition, Pian di Scò, 1992
- Poetic asides I, University of Salzburg, 1992
- Quiintilii Apocalypseos Fragmenta – Introduction, private edition, Pian di Scò, 1992
- Poetry and meaning – Preamble to a selection of lyrical poems for the Freies Gymnasium, Basel (October 1990), private edition, Pian di Scò, 1992
- Vitalism or abdication, private edition, Pian di Scò, 1992
- The exile – from the United Kingdom – 1st Dantesque International Conference (9–10 October 1992, Poppi, Arezzo), from the title it "In the track of Dante; the exile and the writers of the 1900s", private edition, Pian di Scò, 1992
- Campagna, verde campagna, private edition, Pian di Scò, 1992
- Avant-propos ad una lettura delle proprie poesie, private edition, Pian di Scò, 1992
- In the tradition – a British writer living in Italy – An address given to Sarah Lawrence University and Richmond College, Florence, March 1991, private edition, Pian di Scò, 1992
- 'New poetry from Italy' – a review of the anthology "New Italian poets" edited by Dana Gioia & Michael Palm (Story Linens Press, Brownsville, USA, 1991), private edition, Pian di Scò, 1992
- Poetic asides II, University of Salzburg, 1993
- Two notes on Caio Gracco, private edition, Pian di Scò, 1993
- Shelley, Plato and Thomas Taylor – a lecture given at the International Bicentenary Conference on Percy Bysshe Shelley at the University of Salzburg (September–October 1992), private edition, Pian di Scò, 1993
- La visione pavesiane del 'Moby Dick' di Melville – conference held in 1993 near the Municipality of Terranuova Bracciolini, private edition, Pian di Scò, 1994
- Something about poetry – Selected lectures and essays by Peter Russell edited by Glyn Pursglove, University of Salzburg, 1997

== Bibliography ==
- Burns, Richard, 'The Poet Odyssified' – a biographical essay
- Burns, Richard, Obituary, The Independent, 28 January 2003.
- Carpenter, Humphrey, A Serious Character': The Life of Ezra Pound, Faber and Faber, 1988. ISBN 0-571-14786-0.
- Cookson, William, 'E.P. and Agenda: Autobiographical Fragments' in Sons of Ezra: British Poets and Ezra Pound, edited by Michael Alexander & James McGonigal, Rodopi, 1995, ISBN 90-5183-855-7, ISBN 978-90-5183-855-8
- McIntyre, Dennis (editor) International Who's Who in Poetry and Poets' Encyclopedia International Biographical Centre, Routledge, 2001 ISBN 0-948875-59-3, ISBN 978-0-948875-59-5
- Pursglove, Glyn, Obituary, The Guardian, 15 April 2003
- Pursglove, Glyn, Obituary in Acumen 46, May 2003.
- Defelice, Domenico, "La vita come poesia, Peter Russell e il Pratomagno", Pomezia-Notizie, Roma, agosto 2017, pp. 1–7.
