= Anvil Press Poetry =

British poetry publisher

Anvil Press Poetry was an independent poetry publisher based in Greenwich, south-east London. It was founded in 1968 by the poet and translator Peter Jay. It specialised in contemporary British poets, with a leavening of Irish and American, and in a range of translated poetry, from ancient classics to modern and contemporary work. It stopped publishing in 2015, but its books list is held by Carcanet Press of Manchester.

== History ==
Founded in 1968, Anvil Press grew from New Measure, a student magazine edited by Peter Jay at Oxford. Supported by a Rockefeller Foundation grant, Jay published six pamphlets and two books before moving the press to Greenwich in 1969, where it remained until 2015. Jay directed Anvil throughout, with help from a small staff.

Anvil issued six to ten titles annually, often by poets personally connected with Jay. It focused on modern and contemporary poetry in English, publishing Carol Ann Duffy’s first two collections (and two anthologies she edited), seven volumes by Dennis O’Driscoll, and work by F. T. Prince, Stanley Moss, Dick Davis, Ruth Silcock, Heather Buck, Peter Levi, E. A. Markham, Anthony Howell and Martina Evans.

Anvil also built up a distinguished list of translated poetry. It published leading poets from Europe, Latin America and China, including five collections by Chinese poet Bei Dao, Michael Hamburger’s award-winning translations of Paul Celan, and Ted Hughes’s versions of János Pilinszky. It also published pre-1900 and classical works in modern translations.

International in scope, the press’s range was reflected in Jay’s anthology The Spaces of Hope (1998). After cuts in funding by Arts Council England led to Anvil losing much of its subsidy, Peter Jay retired from publishing in 2015, and Anvil Press closed. Its publications list, however, was taken over by Carcanet Press, the Manchester-based poetry publisher.

== Archives ==
The John Rylands Research Institute and Library at Manchester University holds an archive of Anvil Press material. This dates mainly from 1988 onwards, though some author files and business papers predate this. It includes manuscripts, proofs, cover designs, correspondence, reviews, obituaries, financial papers, unsolicited submissions, and some digital records. The archive features correspondence and production files for numerous poets and translators, among them Carol Ann Duffy, Bei Dao, Dennis O’Driscoll, Michael Hamburger, Francis R. Jones, F. T. Prince, Stanley Moss, Peter Levi, and E. A. Markham. Particularly extensive exchanges survive inolving Hamburger, O’Driscoll, Daniel Weissbort, and Anthony Howell.

A similar archive of material from 1965 to 1987 is held by the Harry Ransom Center at the University of Texas at Austin.
