= Peter Dale (poet) =

British writer (1938–2024)

- Born: Peter John Dale; 21 August 1938; Addlestone, Surrey, England
- Died: 25 June 2024 (aged 85); Cardiff, Wales
- Occupations: Poet, translator
- Writing career
- Genre: Poetry

Peter John Dale (21 August 1938 – 25 June 2024) was a British poet and translator particularly noted for his skilful but unobtrusive use of poetic form.

== Life and career ==
Dale was born in Addlestone, Surrey, on 21 August 1938. He took his BA in English at St Peter's College, Oxford, where he studied between 1960–3. He became Chair of the University Poetry Society succeeding his friend, the American Marshall Scholar, Wallace Kaufman, and made friends during this period with fellow poets Ian Hamilton and William Cookson. He soon joined the latter as associate editor and later co-editor of Agenda until 1996. Other friends from that time whose careers intersected with his own were Kevin Crossley-Holland, Yann Lovelock and Grey Gowrie.

A teacher until his retirement in 1993, Dale eventually became Head of English at Hinchley Wood School. Besides his many collections of verse, other books include translations of François Villon, Jules Laforgue, Tristan Corbière and Dante, as well as several interviews with other poets and translators. A few of his own poems refer to his classroom experience, but in general he has remarked that "I like to work in absolute silence, which is hardly what a classroom has to offer. During invigilations the odd epigram could be managed." A selection of such epigrams was eventually published in 2007.

Another side of Dale's work was his skill in drawing out a poet in conversation, based not only on a knowledge of his work but the insight available to a fellow practitioner. In 1993, he had interviewed Ian Hamilton for Agenda. Then in 1997 Hamilton proposed the Between the Lines series of in-depth interviews over dinner with Dale and Philip Hoy. These were to be more wide-ranging than the usual interview and of book length. Over the next three years Dale was to interview Michael Hamburger, Anthony Thwaite and Richard Wilbur for this series.

In 1963, Dale married Pauline Strouvelle, with whom he had a son and a daughter. After 2008, he moved to live in Cardiff. He died there on 25 June 2024, aged 85.

== Poetic style ==
Dale is particularly noted for his skilful use of poetic form, as for example in the sustained use of terza rima in his translation of Dante. His own poems, though usually formal on the surface, employ numerous variations in rhyme, metre and line length, though some of his own poems are short and free, and he took some liberties even in his most traditional work. He himself has said that "a poet shouldn't draw attention to his stylistic self; the poem should be a lens through which something crucial is seen."

Dale's lyric style is intimate whilst avoiding the histrionic pitfalls of the confessional mode. The poems themselves often address another person, but in the main avoid biographical reference. The tension in the poetry is generated by attempts to communicate and frustration that such efforts are never wholly successful, as implied by the title of his sonnet sequence One Another. He takes this demonstration of the clash between dialogue and duologue further in his later sequence Local Habitation in which three points of view are counterpointed through a narrative of changing relationships and moods.

Although his poetry has sometimes been described as quiet, Dale has answered that "Sentences in their rhythms and juxtapositions may be more passionate than words as words. To give one example, the emotion in "A Time to Speak" isn't to be found in individual words but in the sentence rhythms, the tension between speech-rhythm and metric, the pauses, the timing and, on this occasion, the images. But the poem won't seem much to anyone with little experience of life."

== Works ==
Poetry

- Nerve (limited edition of 200, 'hand-set and printed in a hurry') 1959.
- Walk from the House, Fantasy Press, Oxford, 1962.
- The Storms, Macmillan, London, 1968
- Mortal Fire, Macmillan, London, 1970.
- Mortal Fire: Selected Poems, Agenda Editions, London; Ohio University Press, USA, 1976. ISBN 0-8214-0185-8
- Cross Channel, Hippopotamus Press, Sutton, 1977 (a collection of thirteen original poems, with a further eight poems after Corbière and Mallarmé). ISBN 0-904179-13-3
- One Another: a sonnet sequence, Agenda Editions/Carcanet New Press, London & Manchester, 1978. ISBN 0-902400-21-5 (h/b); 0-902400-22-3 (p/b). Revised ed., The Waywiser Press, Chipping Norton UK and Dufour Editions, Baltimore MD, 2002. ISBN 1-904130-05-4
- Too Much of Water: Poems 1976–82, Agenda Editions, London, 1983. ISBN 0-902400-31-2 (h/b); 0-902400-304 (p/b)
- A Set of Darts: epigrams for the 90s (with W.S.Milne and Robert Richardson), Big Little Poem Books, Grimsby, 1990.
- Earth Light, Hippopotamus Press, Frome, 1991. ISBN 0-904179-55-9 (h/b); ISBN 0-904179-56-7 (p/b)
- Edge to Edge: New and Selected Poems, Anvil Press, London, 1996. ISBN 978-0-85646-272-6
- Da Capo, Agenda Editions, London, 1999. ISBN 978-0-902400-60-3
- Under the Breath, Anvil Press, London, 2002, ISBN 978-0-85646-347-1
- Eight by Five (epigrams), Rack Press, Presteigne, Wales, 2007. ISBN 0-9527217-5-9
- Local Habitation: a sequence of poems, Anvil Press, London, 2009. ISBN 978-0-85646-418-8
- Diffractions: new and collected poems, Anvil Press, London, 2012. ISBN 0856464392
- Fathoming Earth: Two Poems, Minilith Press, Cardiff, 2014. ISBN 978-0992987510
- Aquatints: New Poems, Minilith Press, Cardiff, 2015. ISBN 978-0992987541
- Penumbral: Poems 2016 - 2018, Minilith Press, Cardiff, 2018. ISBN 978-0992987534
- Earthly Use: Poems 2018-2020, Minilith Press, Cardiff, 2020. ISBN 978-0992987565

Translations

- The Legacy, The Testament and Other Poems of François Villon, Macmillan, London, 1973; St Martin's Press, New York, 1973; Anvil Press revised edition, London, 2001. ISBN 978-0-85646-323-5
- The Seasons of Cankam: Love Poems Translated from the Tamil (with Kokilam Subbiah), Agenda Editions, London, 1975. ISBN 0-902400-11-8
- Selected Poems of François Villon, Penguin, Harmondsworth, 1978, 1988, 1994
- Narrow Straits: Poems from the French, Hippopotamus Press, Frome, 1985. ISBN 0-904179-34-6
- Poems of Jules Laforgue, Anvil Press Poetry, London, 1986 (new ed. 2001), ISBN 0-85646-145-8
- Dante: The Divine Comedy, Anvil Press, London, 1996, 1998, 2001, 2003, 2004, 2007. ISBN 978-0-85646-287-0, 978-0-85646-280-1,
- Wry-Blue Loves (Les amours jaunes) and Other Poems by Tristan Corbière, Anvil Press, London, 2005. ISBN 978-0-85646-377-8
- Paul Valéry, Charms and Other Writings, Anvil Press, London, 2007. ISBN 978-0-85646-398-3
- At an Odd Angle. Poems. Erminia Passannanti & Peter Dale, Kindle Direct Amazon, Oxford, 2025. ISBN 979-8311593052

Other

- An Introduction to Rhyme, Agenda/Bellew, 1998. ISBN 1-85725-124-5
- Michael Hamburger in Conversation with Peter Dale, Between the Lines, Chipping Norton; Dufour Editions, Baltimore MD, 1998. ISBN 978-0-9532841-1-5
- Anthony Thwaite in Conversation with Peter Dale and Ian Hamilton, Between The Lines, Chipping Norton; Dufour Editions, Baltimore MD, 1999. ISBN 978-0-9532841-2-2
- Richard Wilbur in Conversation with Peter Dale, Between The Lines, Chipping Norton; Dufour Editions Baltimore MD, 2000. ISBN 978-0-9532841-5-3
- Peter Dale in Conversation with Cynthia Haven, Between The Lines, Chipping Norton, 2005. ISBN 978-1-903291-13-9
- "I have always tried to avoid literary and journalistic pigeon-holing of my work", Lidia Vianu's 2001 interview with Peter Dale in Desperado Essay-Interviews, Editura Universitatii din Bucuresti, 2006; revised edition 2009, pp. 71–84. ISBN 978-606-92167-0-5
