= Leonello =

Leonello is a given name. Notable people with the name include:

- Leonello Casucci (1885–1975), Italian composer
- Leonello d'Este (1407–1450), Marquess of Ferrara, Modena, and Reggio Emilia
- Leonello Picco (1876–1921), Italian entomologist
- Leonello Rabatti (born 1960), Italian poet and critic
- Leonello Spada (also called Lionello Spada) (1576–1622), Italian painter
- Leonello Tarabella (born 1948), Italian researcher, musician and composer
