= False start (disambiguation) =

A false start is a prohibited movement before play begins in sports.

False start may also refer to:

== Music ==
- False Start (album), a 1970 album by Love
- False Start (band), a band from Auckland, New Zealand
- "False Start", a song by Bikini Kill from Reject All American

== Other uses ==
- False Start (film), (Falscher Start), a 1919 German silent film directed by Georg Alexander
- TLS False Start, a security feature developed by Google
- False start, a speech disfluency
- False Start, a painting by Jasper Johns
- A False Start: London Poems 1959–1963, a collection of poems by Peter Russell published in 1993

== See also ==
- Early Start
