= George Pavlopoulos =

Greek poet

George Pavlopoulos (Greek: Γιώργης Παυλόπουλος; 22 June 1924 – 26 November 2008) was a Greek poet, relatively unknown outside Greece, but admired within his own country by fellow poets such as George Seferis.

George or Giorgos or Giorgis or Georgios Pavlopoulos as known in the literature field, was born in Pyrgos, on the west coast of the Peloponnese in Greece. Before World War II Pyrgos was a rich provincial centre and Pavlopoulos's father ran a local restaurant and cake shop. He was educated at primary and secondary levels in Pyrgos, a childhood illness left him permanently lame. He attended the School of Law at the University of Athens He did not complete his degree and returned to Pyrgos where he worked as book-keeper and secretary for the local bus company. Upon his return from Athens he married a local girl and theyhad a son named Haralabos.

Childhood friends of his in Pyrgos included the musician Mikis Theodorakis and Takis Sinopoulos the poet.

In 1943, during the German occupation, the local bishop allowed Pavlopoulos access to the cathedral printing press. With some of his school friends he printed and published a magazine called Odyssey containing his first published poem. This group included Takis Sinopoulos with whom he later wrote experimental cooperative poetry. The group performed a play, advertised with posters proclaiming Freedom or Death. The text was controversial and landed Pavlopoulos in trouble with the local Gestapo, who asked who had written it. Pavlopoulos had eventually to pretend that it was by Victor Hugo, although it had been written by themselves.

The Nazi withdrawal at close of war lead to bitter fighting between factions in the resistance. The unhappiness of war and civil war is reflected in much of Pavlopoulos's poetry.

His poetry has been translated into other languages, including: English, French, German, Italian, Polish, Russian and Spanish. He has taken part in cultural festivals in Greece and elsewhere and is a founder member of the Greek Society of Authors.

He died on 26 November 2008.

== Sources ==
- CENSUS of Modern Greek Literature
- Levi, Peter in Pavlopoulos, George (1971). Trans. Peter Levi. The Cellar. London: Anvil Press Poetry.
