= Jennie Feldman =

English poet and translator

Jennie Feldman née Goldman (born 1952) is a South African-born English poet and translator.

== Life ==
Born in Cape Town, South Africa, in 1952, she grew up in London and studied French at St Hilda's College, Oxford.
She worked as a producer and presenter of radio documentaries, one of which, The House on the Hill on the Spafford Children's Centre in Jerusalem, was awarded a Gold Medal in the 1990 International Radio Festival of New York.

Feldman has published three poetry collections: The Lost Notebook (2005), which was shortlisted for the Glen Dimplex Poetry Award in 2006, Swift (2012), and No Cherry Time (2022) and four works of translated French poetry and prose. These include the anthology Into the Deep Street: Seven Modern French Poets, 1938-2008 (2009), co-edited with Stephen Romer, which has been described as «the best parallel-text introduction to modern and contemporary French poetry available». It was awarded a special commendation by the judges of the 2011 Popescu European Poetry Translation Prize.

Her poems, translations, reviews and essays have appeared in several journals, including The Times Literary Supplement, Poetry Review, PN Review and Stand.

== Selected bibliography ==
Collections of Poems:

- Jennie Feldman, The Lost Notebook, Anvil Press Poetry/Carcanet, London 2005. ISBN 9780856463815
- Jennie Feldman, Swift, Anvil Press Poetry/Carcanet, London 2012. ISBN 9780856464430
- Jennie Feldman, No Cherry Time, Arc Publications, 2022. ISBN 9781910345818

Translations:

- Jacques Réda, Treading Lightly: Selected Poems 1961–1975, Translated by Jennie Feldman, Anvil Press Poetry/Carcanet, London 2005. ISBN 9780856463808
- Into the Deep Street. Seven Modern French Poets. 1938–2008, Edited and translated by Jennie Feldman and Stephen Romer, Anvil Press Poetry/Carcanet, London 2009. ISBN 9780856464164
- Jacques Réda, Cette folle. Birds, Blues and What Music Means, The Times Literary Supplement no. 5667, November 11, 2011, pp. 14–15. https://link.gale.com/apps/doc/EX1200562852/TLSH?u=tlsacc&sid=TLSH&xid=
- Jacques Réda, The Mirabelle Pickers, Translated by Jennie Feldman, Anvil Press Poetry/Carcanet, London 2012. ISBN 9780856464492
- Marcel Proust, Chardin and Rembrandt, Translated by Jennie Feldman, Afterword by Alain Madeleine-Perdrillat, David Zwirner Books, New York 2016. https://davidzwirnerbooks.com/product/chardin-and-rembrandt

Collections:

- Ardyn Halter, ed.,The Water's Edge. Meetings of Image and Word, poems by Jennie Feldman, Seamus Heaney, Geoffrey Hill, Gabriel Levin, Michael Longley, Jamie McKendrick, Paul Muldoon, Don Paterson, Robin Robertson, and Stephen Romer, Lund Humphries, Burlington 2006, pp. 96–97.
