= Seán Mac Falls =

Irish poet (born 1957)

- Born: November 18, 1957 (age 68)
- Writing career
- Genre: Poetry

Seán Mac Falls (born 18 November 1957– 15 June 2023) was an Irish poet. Belonging to no group or movement and operating outside of literary fashions, his brand of symbolist poetry can, at first reading, appear difficult. His use of allusion, startling diction and subtle punning display submerged metaphor in his work. The overall effect is a fresh implementation of Imagism.

He has written seven books of poetry and several chapbooks. His first collection of poems, 20 Poems (2001, ISBN 1-929812-05-1), won praise from Oxford University don John Carey, who compared the poet to W. B. Yeats and from Yale critic Harold Bloom. Several of the poems were Pushcart Prize nominations and were reprinted in eminent American and UK magazines, including Poet Lore, The Lyric (magazine), Agenda, The London Magazine and Stand Magazine

He published a second book, entitled The Blue Falcon, in 2005 (ISBN 192981206X). His latest book of verse, is called Garden Theology.

== Books ==
- 20 Poems, Peregrine Press, 2001
- The Blue Falcon, Peregrine Press, 2005
- iKu (Kanshi & Haiku) with paintings by David Coleridge Ryan, Peregrine Press, 2014
- Moon Harvest Under Wood, Peregrine Press, 2016
- Fables and Whim, Peregrine Press, 2018
- Love Songs of Skye, Peregrine Press, 2021
- Garden Theology, Tupelo Press, 2022
