= Jacques Réda =

French poet, jazz critic and flâneur (1929–2024)

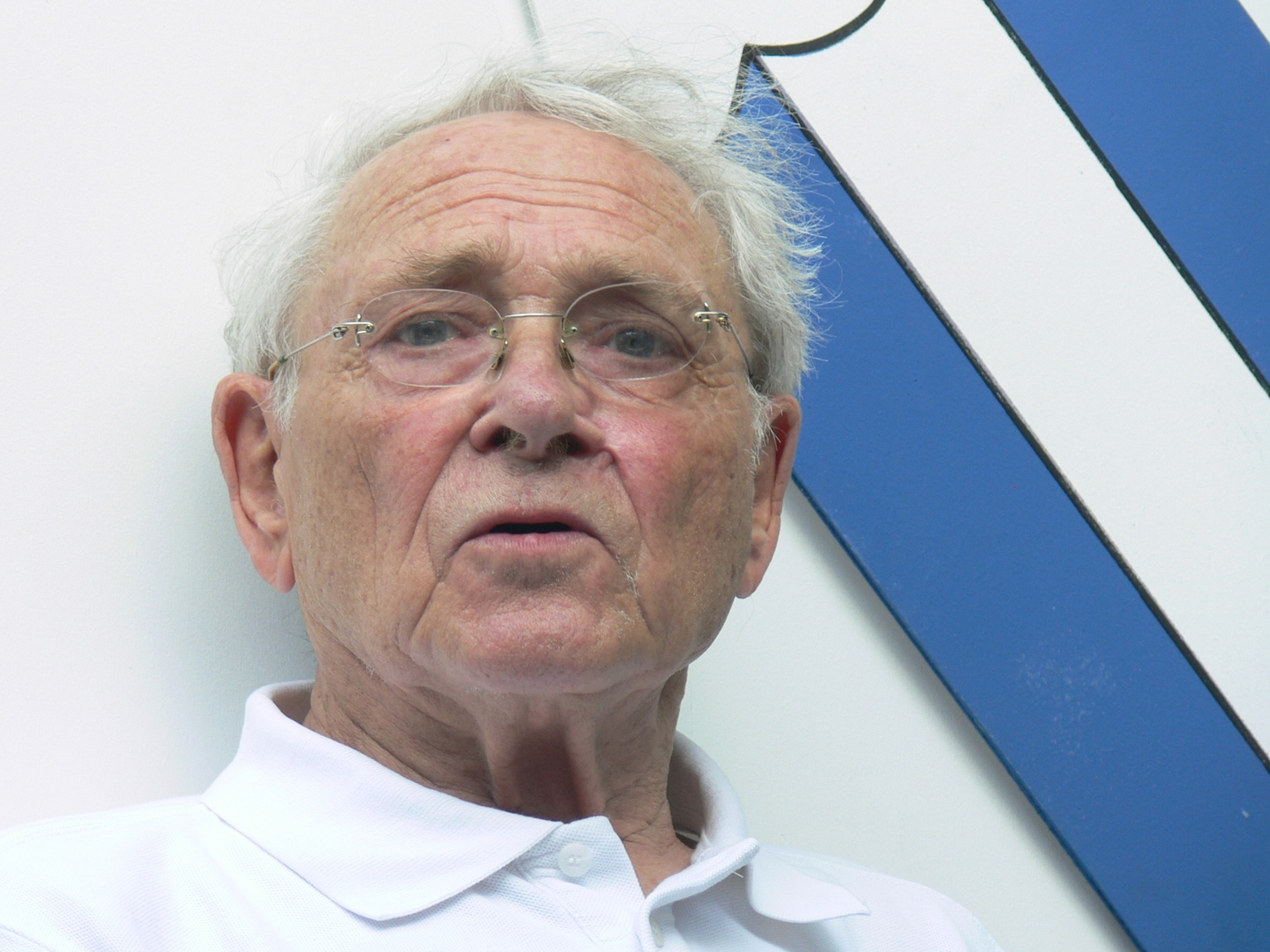
Jacques Réda

Jacques Réda (24 January 1929 – 30 September 2024) was a French poet, jazz critic, and flâneur. He was awarded the Prix Valery Larbaud in 1983, and was chief editor of the Nouvelle Revue Française from 1987 to 1996. Réda died on 30 September 2024, at the age of 95.

== Works ==
- Amen (1968)
- Récitatif (1971)
- Les Ruines de Paris (1977) (The Ruins of Paris, trans. Mark Treharne, Reaktion Books, London, 1996)
- L’Improviste, une lecture du jazz (1980)
- L’Herbe des talus (1984)
- Celle qui vient à pas légers (1985)
- Jouer le jeu (L’Improviste II) (1985)
- Retour au calme (1989) (Return to Calm, trans. by Aaron Prevots, 2007, Host Publications, Inc.)
- Le Sens de la marche (1990)
- Aller aux mirabelles, Gallimard (1991) (English translation: The Mirabelle Pickers, trans. by Jennie Feldman, Anvil Press Poetry, London 2012)
