= Anthony Hecht =

American poet (1923–2004)

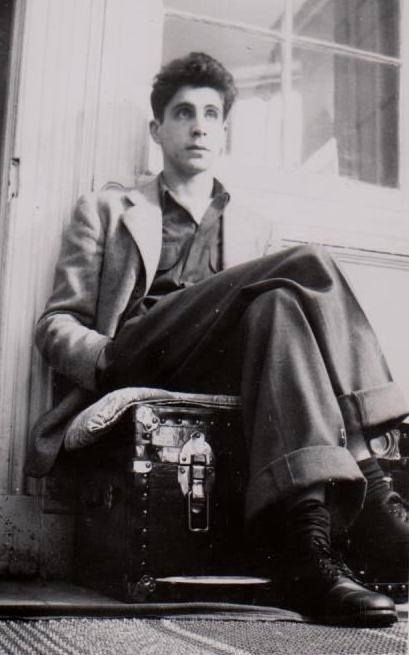
- Born: Anthony Evan Hecht; January 16, 1923; New York City, New York, U.S.
- Died: October 20, 2004 (aged 81); Washington, D.C., U.S.
- Education: Bard College; Kenyon College (BA); Columbia University (MA); University of Iowa
- Occupation: Poet

Anthony Evan Hecht (January 16, 1923 – October 20, 2004) was an American poet. His work combined a deep interest in form with a passionate desire to confront the horrors of 20th-century history, with the Second World War, in which he fought, and the Holocaust being recurrent themes in his work.

== Biography ==
=== Early years ===
Hecht was born in New York City to German-Jewish parents. He was educated at various schools in the city – he was a classmate of Jack Kerouac at Horace Mann School – but showed no great academic ability, something he would later refer to as "conspicuous". However, as a freshman English student at Bard College in New York he discovered the works of Wallace Stevens, W. H. Auden, T. S. Eliot, and Dylan Thomas. It was at this point that he decided he would become a poet. Hecht's parents were not happy at his plans and tried to discourage them, even getting family friend Ted Geisel, better known as Dr. Seuss, to attempt to dissuade him.

In 1944, upon completing his final year at Bard, Hecht was drafted into the 97th Infantry Division and was sent to the battlefields in Europe. He saw combat in Germany in the "Ruhr Pocket" and in Cheb in Czechoslovakia. However, his most significant experience occurred on April 23, 1945, when Hecht's division helped liberate Flossenbürg concentration camp. Hecht was ordered to interview French prisoners in the hope of gathering evidence on the camp's commanders. Years later, Hecht said of this experience, "The place, the suffering, the prisoners' accounts were beyond comprehension. For years after I would wake shrieking."

=== Career ===
After the war ended, Hecht was sent to occupied Japan, where he became a staff writer with Stars and Stripes. He returned to the US in March 1946 and immediately took advantage of the G.I. Bill to study under the poet–critic John Crowe Ransom at Kenyon College, Ohio. Here he came into contact with fellow poets such as Randall Jarrell, Elizabeth Bishop, and Allen Tate. He later received his master's degree from Columbia University. In 1947 Hecht attended the University of Iowa and taught in the Iowa Writers' Workshop, together with writer Robie Macauley, with whom Hecht had served during World War II, but, suffering from post-traumatic stress disorder after his war service, gave it up swiftly to enter psychoanalysis.

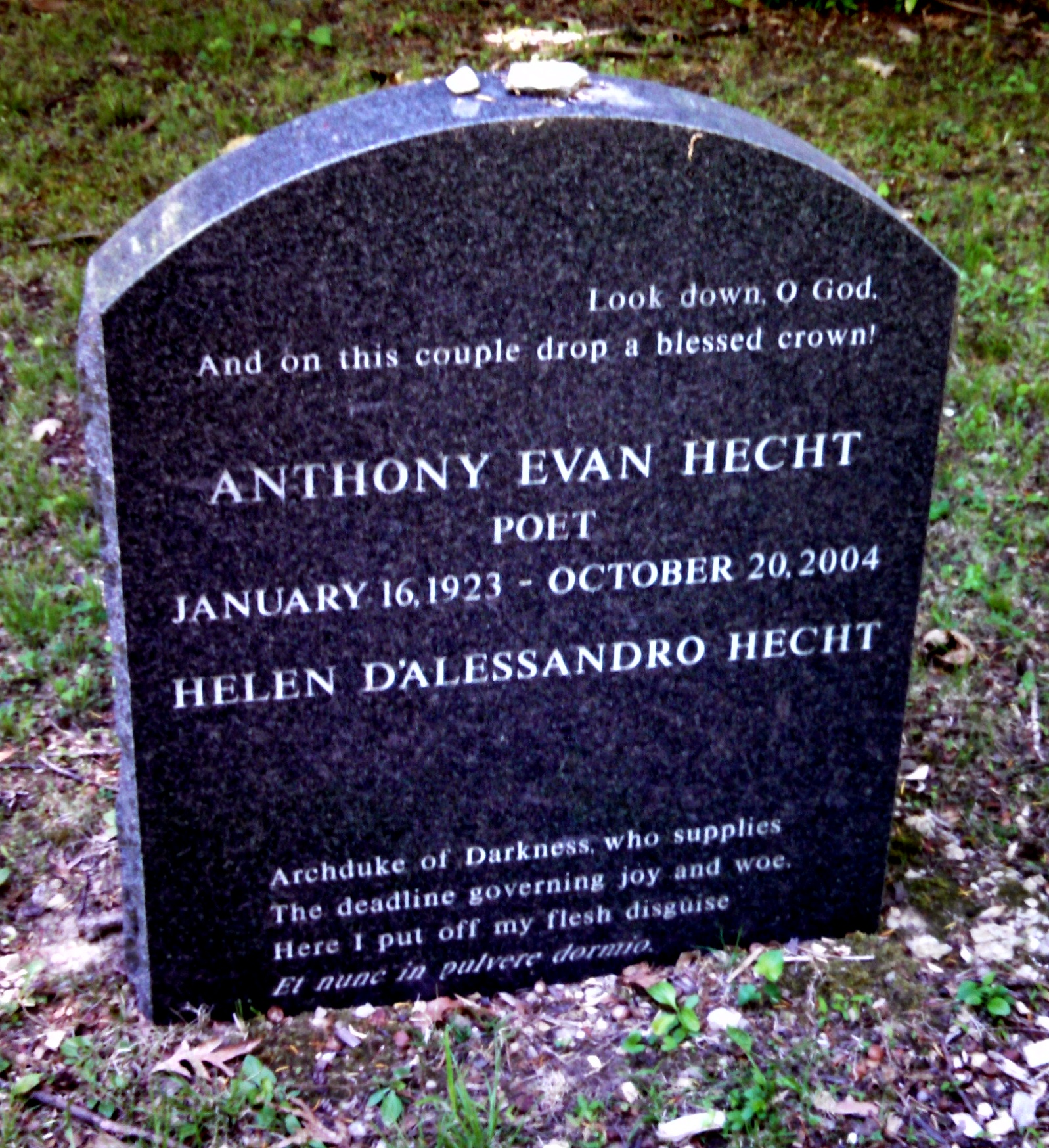
Hecht's grave at Bard College Cemetery in Annandale-on-Hudson, New York

In spring, 1947, he taught at Kenyon. His first poems, "Once Removed" and "To a Soldier Killed in Germany", were published in The Kenyon Review. Later that year, he suffered a nervous breakdown and returned to his parents' home in New York City and entered psychoanalysis. In 1948, his poems began to appear in The Hudson Review, Poetry, and Furioso. He later won the Furioso Poetry Award and enrolled at Columbia University as a candidate for a master's degree in English literature.

Hecht released his first collection, A Summoning of Stones, in 1954. Even at this stage Hecht's poetry was often compared with that of W. H. Auden, with whom Hecht had become friends in 1951 during a holiday on the Italian island of Ischia, where Auden spent each summer. In 1993 Hecht published The Hidden Law, a critical reading of Auden's body of work. In his second book, The Hard Hours, Hecht first addressed his own experiences of World War II – memories that had caused him to have a nervous breakdown in 1959. Hecht spent three months in hospital following his breakdown, although he was spared electric shock therapy, unlike Sylvia Plath, whom he had encountered while teaching at Smith College.

Hecht's main source of income was as a teacher of poetry, most notably at the University of Rochester, where he taught from 1967 to 1985. He also spent varying lengths of time teaching at other notable institutions such as Smith, Bard, Harvard, Georgetown, and Yale. Between 1982 and 1984, he held the esteemed position of Poet Laureate Consultant in Poetry to the Library of Congress. Hecht won a number of literary awards including: the 1968 Pulitzer Prize for Poetry (for The Hard Hours), the 1983 Bollingen Prize, the 1988 Ruth Lilly Poetry Prize, the 1989 Aiken Taylor Award for Modern American Poetry, the 1997 Wallace Stevens Award, the 1999/2000 Frost Medal, and the Tanning Prize.

Hecht died on October 20, 2004, at his home in Washington, D.C.; he is buried at the cemetery at Bard College. One month later, on November 17, Hecht was awarded the National Medal of Arts, accepted on his behalf by his wife, Helen Hecht.

The Anthony Hecht Poetry Prize is awarded annually by the Waywiser Press.

== Literary style, inspirations, and themes ==
Hecht was known for his masterful use of traditional forms and linguistic control. Extraordinarily erudite, his verse often features allusions to French literature, Greek myth, and tragedy, and English poets and poetry stretching from Wallace Stevens to John Donne. He was often described as a "traditionalist". In The Hard Hours (1967), Hecht drew upon his experiences as a soldier in Europe during World War II.

== Bibliography ==
Poetry

- A Summoning of Stones (1954)
- The Hard Hours (1967)
- Millions of Strange Shadows (1977)
- The Venetian Vespers (1979)
- The Transparent Man (1990)
- Collected Earlier Poems (Alfred A. Knopf, Inc., 1990). Selected for inclusion in Harold Bloom's Western Canon.
- Flight Among the Tombs (1998)
- The Darkness and the Light (2001)
- Collected Later Poems (Alfred A. Knopf, 2003)
- Collected Poems of Anthony Hecht (edited by Philip Hoy, Alfred A. Knopf, 2023)

Translations

- Aeschylus's Seven Against Thebes (1973) (with Helen H. Bacon)

Other Works

- Obbligati: Essays in Criticism (1986)
- The Hidden Law: The Poetry of W. H. Auden (1993)
- On the Laws of the Poetic Art (1995)
- Melodies Unheard: Essays on the Mysteries of Poetry (Johns Hopkins University Press) (2003)
- Anthony Hecht in Conversation with Philip Hoy (Between the Lines) (2005)
- Literary Genius: 25 Classic Writers Who Define English & American Literature (2007) (Illustrated by Barry Moser)
