= Helen Firth =

British geneticist

Academic background
- Education: BA, University of Oxford; DM, Brasenose College, Oxford
- Thesis: A study of limb-reduction and other birth defects in babies exposed to first trimester chorionic villus sampling (1998)

Helen V. Firth is a British geneticist who specialises in the application of new genomic technologies to improve the diagnosis of severe developmental disorders. She is clinical lead for the UK-wide Deciphering Developmental Disorders project and global DECIPHER platform for data-sharing in rare disease. In 2020, she was elected a Fellow of the Academy of Medical Sciences.

== Career ==
In 2004, Firth, who was working as a consultant clinical geneticist at Addenbrooke’s Hospital in Cambridge, established the global DECIPHER platform for data-sharing in rare disease following the publication of Human Genome Project. Since 2006, Firth has been an Honorary Visiting Senior Research Fellow in the University of Cambridge’s School of Clinical Medicine. Later, in 2011, Firth and colleague Caroline F. Wright published their findings as the clinical leads for the UK-wide Deciphering Developmental Disorders (DDD) project. The aim of the project was to "undertake systematic phenotyping and detailed genomic analysis for 12,000 children with severe undiagnosed developmental disorders."

In 2020, she was elected a Fellow of the Academy of Medical Sciences for her "exceptional contributions to advancing biomedical science via world-leading research discoveries, running national science communication and engagement programmes and translating scientific advances into benefits for patients and the public."

Firth is the co-author of two books, Clinical Genetics (1st ed 2005, 2nd ed 2017 as Clinical Genetics and Genomics) and the Oxford Handbook of Genetics.
