= Stephen Romer =

British poet

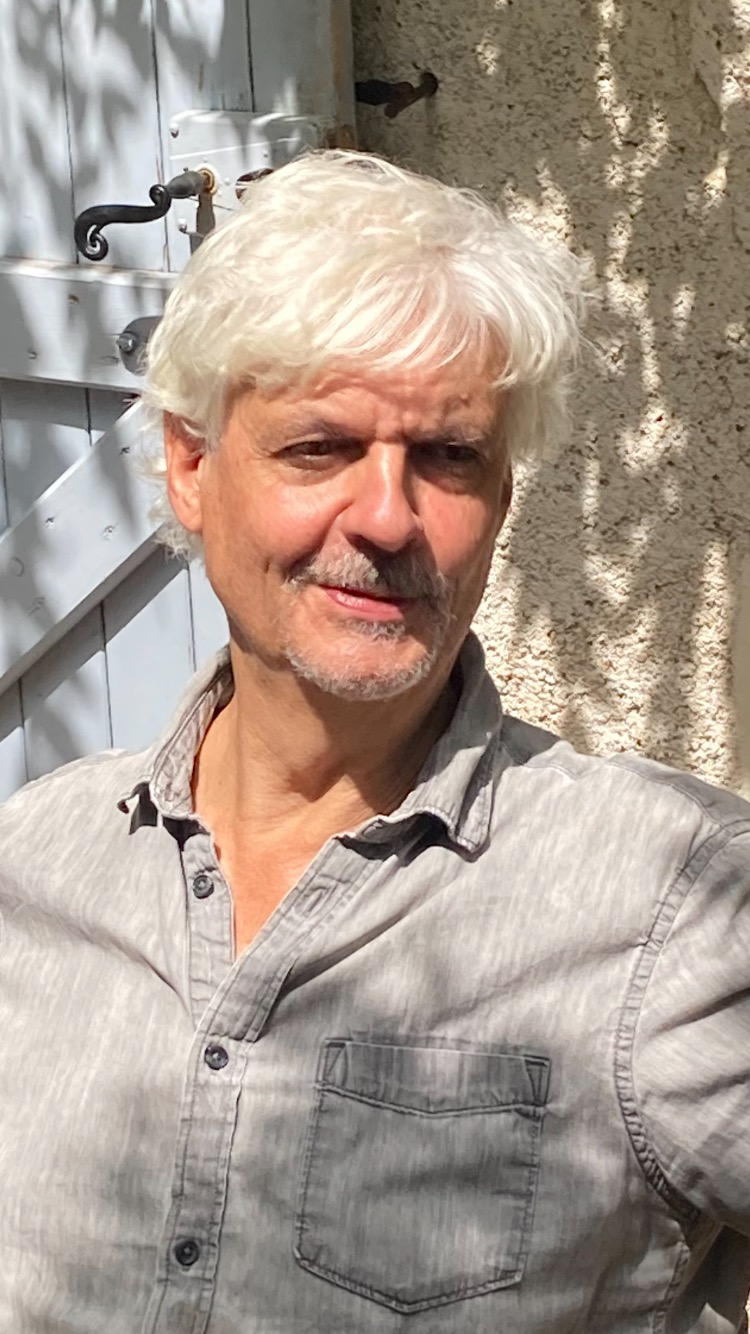
- Born: 1957 (age 68–69); England
- Education: Trinity Hall, Cambridge
- Occupations: Poet, lecturer, literary critic

Stephen Romer, FRSL (born 1957) is an English poet, academic and literary critic.

== Biography ==
Stephen Romer was born in Hertfordshire, England in 1957 and educated at Radley College and Trinity Hall, Cambridge. After a year spent in the US, on a Henry Fellowship at Harvard (1978–79), he began work on his PhD, and was awarded a bursary to study at the British Institute in Paris. In 1981 he moved to France, where he taught English at the British Institute, the American University in Paris and at Paris X-Nanterre, before becoming Maître de Conférences (senior lecturer) in the English department at Tours where he still teaches. He has been three times O'Connor Visiting Professor in Romance Languages at Colgate University (New York). Romer now divides him time between Tours and Oxford, where he is currently Stipendiary Lecturer in French at Brasenose College. He has been Visiting Fellow at Sidney Sussex, Cambridge (2003), and in Oxford at All Souls (2010), Saint Anne's (2015), Christ Church (Fowler-Hamilton VF, 2016). In 2017 he was appointed Royal Literary Fund Fellow for two years at Worcester College, and then served as RLF Fellow for a further two years at the Faculty of Medieval and Modern Languages. He was made Fellow of the Royal Society of Literature in 2011 and Chevalier de l'Ordre des Arts et des Lettres in 2021.

== Poetry ==
Romer's first full collection was Idols published by Oxford University Press in 1986, a Poetry Book Society Recommendation. Subsequent collections include Plato's Ladder (OUP, 1992), a Poetry Book Society Choice ; Tribute (OUP, 1998) ; Yellow Studio (Carcanet/Oxford Poets 2008), PBS recommendation. Set Thy Love in Order, his New & Selected poems, was published by Carcanet in 2017. Two collections of his poetry have appeared in French : Tribut (Le Temps qu'il fait, 2007) and Le Fauteuil jaune (Le Bruit du temps, 2021), translated by Antoine Jaccottet, Gilles Ortlieb, Paul de Roux and Valérie Rouzeau. His poems have also appeared in Italian, Polish and Spanish translation.

== Criticism, editions and translations ==
Stephen Romer has been active as critic, editor and translator. His 20th Century French Poems was published by Faber and Faber in 2002. Into the Deep Street : 7 Modern French Poets (1938-2008), co-translated with Jennie Feldman, (Anvil, 2009) won Special Commendation for the Popescu Prize 2009. He has contributed translations to many anthologies including The Yale Book of Twentieth-Century French Poetry, ed. M-A Caws, (2002) and French Poetry : from Medieval to Modern Times, ed. Patrick McGuinness (Dent Everyman, 2017). He has translated widely from French poetry, mostly modern and contemporary (Jean Follain, Philippe Jaccottet, Paul de Roux, Gilles Ortlieb and Valérie Rouzeau), but also from the Iambes of André Chénier, and from the war poetry of Apollinaire.

Over the years, Romer has produced editions and translations of Yves Bonnefoy, widely considered the major French post-war poet and thinker. These include The Arrière-pays, Bonnefoy's celebrated spiritual and aesthetic autobiography, (Seagull, 2012), and The Red Scarf, the poet's final prose memoir, (Seagull, 2020). With John Naughton and Anthony Rudolf, Romer co-edited the major collection of Bonnefoy now available in English, the two-volume Carcanet Reader. He was lead editor and provided a substantial analytic introduction for the volume Prose (Carcanet, 2020).

As a product of his interest in the foundations of Franco-British Modernism, Romer edited and translated French Decadent Tales (Oxford World's Classics, 2013), an anthology of short stories from the era of so-called Décadence, including writers like Jules Barbey d'Aurevilly, Auguste Villiers de L'Isle-Adam, Guy de Maupassant, Octave Mirbeau, Léon Bloy, Marcel Schwob, Jean Lorrain, Catulle Mendès, Jean Richepin and Pierre Louÿs.

Pursuing an academic career, Romer has contributed numerous chapters to edited books, notably on Pierre Reverdy, Paul Valéry, T. S. Eliot and Ezra Pound, and articles to learned journals (Essays in Criticism, Etudes anglaises). He has written criticism for The Guardian, The Times Literary Supplement, Literary Review, The London Magazine, PN Review, The Poetry Review and others. He edited a selection from the poet Robert Herrick, for Faber's 'poet to poet' series (Faber, 2010).

A selection of his essays was published in 2024 under the title Chaos and the Clean Line.

== Reception ==
As early as in 1996 Romer's early writings were favourably cited in an entry of The Oxford Companion to Twentieth-Century Literature in English : "Derek Mahon's 'commendation of Romer's emotional candour and intellectual clarity' summarizes the essential qualities of his work. Plato's Ladder further demonstrates his ability to express intimate and intense personal experience while retaining the impress of a complex and erudite sensibility'. Four years later Romer was also among Routledge's Who's Who in Twentieth-Century World Poetry. Romer eventually became the youngest writer of a 2005 Anthologie Bilingue de la Poésie Anglaise by the prestigious French publishing house Bibliothèque de la Pléiade. In 2022 he was also included in L'Île Rebelle, another Gallimard poetry anthology.

== Awards ==
- 1983 : Eric Gregory Award
- 1986 : Poetry Book Society Recommendation for Idols
- 1992 : Poetry Book Society Choice for Plato's Ladder
- 2008 : Yellow Studio, Poetry Book Society Recommendation, shortlisted for the T.S.Eliot Prize
- 2009 : Popescu European Translation Prize Special Commendation (with Jennie Feldman) for Into the Deep Street : 7 Modern French Poets (1938-2008)
- 2011 : Fellow of the Royal Society of Literature
- 2021 : Chevalier de l'Ordre des Arts et des Lettres

== Work ==
=== Poetry ===
- Idols. Manchester: Oxford University Press, 1986
- Plato's Ladder. Manchester: Oxford University Press, 1992
- Tribute. Manchester: Oxford University Press, 1998
- Yellow Studio. Manchester: Oxford Poets/Carcanet Press, 2008
- Five Poems. Clutag Press, Five Poems Series (2016)
- The Wounded Centaur (with Peter McDonald). Tower Editions, 2017
- Set Thy Love in Order: New & Selected Poems. Carcanet Press, 2017
- In French translation : Le fauteuil jaune, pref. Stephen Romer, tr. Antoine Jaccottet, Gilles Ortlieb (Le Bruit du temps, 2021);Tribut, pref. Valérie Rouzeau, tr. Gilles Ortlieb, Paul de Roux, Valérie Rouzeau (Le temps qu'il fait, 2007)
- Night Contradicts the Day. Brighton: Daregale Press, 2026

=== Essays ===
- Chaos and the Clean Line: Writings on Franco-British Modernism. Oxford: Legenda, Transcript. 2024

=== Translations ===
- Alain Dugrand, Stephen Romer (trs.) Trotsky in Mexico Manchester: Lives and Letters/Carcanet Press, 1992
- Roger Pol-Droit, 101 Everyday Philosophical Experiments, (Faber & Faber, 2002)
- Twentieth Century French Poems, Faber & Faber, 2002. SR editor and contributing translator, with an introduction, (Faber & Faber, 2002). Volume includes specially commissioned translations by, among others, Mark Ford, Alan Jenkins, Paul Muldoon and Anthony Rudolf.
- Into the Deep Street: 7 Modern French Poets, 1938-2008, translation (with Jennie Feldman) of contemporary French poets. Introduction by SR. (Anvil, 2009)
- Paul Valéry: contributing chapter 'Thêta' for the ongoing collective translation into English of the poet's Cahiers (General ed. Brian Stimpson, Peter Lang, vols. 3 & 4 2010). In 2002 SR's translation of two earlier chapters, 'Poiétique' and 'Petits poèmes en prose' was published in Volume 2 of the ongoing series.
- Yves Bonnefoy: The Arrière-pays, and three later texts. Introduction and notes by SR. (Seagull Books/Chicago, 2012).
- French Decadent Tales: Anthology of Decadent Stories in French. Introduction and notes by SR. (OUP, Oxford World's Classics, 2013
- Writing the Real: A Bilingual Anthology of Contemporary French Poetry (translated Gilles Ortlieb), Enitharmon Press, 2016
- Yves Bonnefoy: Selected Poems & Poetic Prose/ Selected Essays, 2 volumes, eds. John Naughton, Stephen Romer, Anthony Rudolf. SR contributed Introduction and notes for vol.2. (Carcanet, 2017 & 2020)
- Yves Bonnefoy: The Red Scarf and Other Texts, postface by SR. (Seagull Books/Chicago University Press, 2020)
- Gilles Ortlieb: The Day's Ration: Selected Poems, translation (with Patrick McGuinness). Todmorden: Arc Publications. 2023

=== Critical papers in edited volumes and journals ===
- 'Pierre Reverdy, “L'esprit du dehors”', in Twentieth-Century French Poetry: A Critical Anthology, ed. Peter Collier, Cambridge University Press (2010)
- 'T.S.Eliot and France', in Jason Harding ed., T.S.Eliot in Context, Cambridge University Press (2011)
- “Venus at Terracina” or the Mediterranean Sanity', in Roma/Amor: Ezra Pound, Rome and Love, eds. William Pratt and Caterina Ricciardi, (AMS Press, 2013)
- 'A Black Hat, Silence and Bomb-Shells', in The Palm-Beach Effect: Reflections on Michael Hofmann, eds. André Saffis-Nahely & Julian Stannard, CB Editions, 2013
- 'European Affinities', in Peter Robinson ed., The Oxford Handbook of Contemporary British and Irish Poetry, Oxford University Press (2013)
- “Buildings, Ornamentation!” -Ezra Pound and London Architecture', in Ezra Pound: The London Years, eds. Walter Baumann & William Pratt, AMS Press 2014)
- 'La guerre: une parenthèse dans l'oeuvre du poète?' Address given in French to open the conference 'Les armes et la lyre' held at Strasbourg in November 2014, to mark the centenary of the outbreak of hostilities in 1914. Discussion of the poets and artists Richard Aldington, Henri Gaudier-Brzeska and David Jones. Later collected in Les armes et la lyre: Charles Péguy, Ernst Stadler, Wilfred Owen, ed. Tatiana Victoroff, (Paris: Editions Garnier/Classique, 2019)
- 'The Fine Thing Held in the Mind: Painterliness Emanating in Pound's Early Poems & Cantos' in Ezra Pound's Green World: Nature, Landscape and Language. Essays from the EPIC Brunnenburg Conference 2015, (Brighton: Edward Everett Root, 2019)
- 'Laus et Vituperatio: The Triumph of Love; Speech! Speech!; The Orchards of Syon. Geoffrey Hill's Later Trilogy'. Essay on the key collections of Hill's later work. Etudes anglaises (special Geoffrey Hill edition, ed. Jennifer Kilgore), 2018
- 'Ezra Pound and Architecture', in The Edinburgh Companion to Ezra Pound and the Arts, ed. Roxana Preda. (Edinburgh: Edinburgh University Press, 2019)
- 'The Passionate Moment: Untranslated Quotation in Pound and Eliot. The example of High Modernism' in Modernism and the Untranslated Quotation, eds. Jason Harding and John Nash, (Oxford: Oxford University Press, 2019)
- 'A Foaming Toby-Jug', on Michael Shallcross: Re-thinking G.K.Chesterton and Literary Modernism, in Essays in Criticism, 2020

=== Edited books ===
- A Day of Unusual Measure: Poems, Diary and Letters of James Julian Malpas, ed. Stephen Romer (with John Alexander & Nick Friend), Little Creatures Press (2021)
