= Peter Dent =

English poet and editor

- Born: May 9, 1938 (age 88); Forest Gate, London, England
- Occupation: Poet

Peter Dent (born 9 May 1938) is an English editor, poet, and former school teacher whose poetry has moved from spare notations to linguistic experiments.

== Career ==
Dent was born in Forest Gate, London, on 9 May 1938 but spent most of his childhood in Surrey. After serving in the Signals section of the RAF between 1957 and 9, he worked in offices and a library before training as a primary school teacher at Reading University. Thereafter he taught between 1971 and 1991. He was the editor/publisher of Interim Press from 1975 to 1987, starting this while living in Egham. In 1978 he moved to Budleigh Salterton, where he has lived since. He taught at Drakes Primary School, East Budleigh.

Dent's poetry began as spare notations in which time, place and emotion form a unified whole, which identified him with the writers of Agenda magazine. He has moved on since into both verse and prose poetry of considerable stylistic experiment. His latest writing consists of linguistic constructs of both humour and ingenuity. Peter Hughes has described the way "Language of political disinformation or advertising morphs into that of intimate reflection. A vocabulary of emotional intensity suddenly appears in corporate training talk. Words wriggle free of context to resonate afresh in unexpected settings. The texts breach categories of inside and outside, public and private, control and freedom – thus questioning, reviewing and re-presenting the nature of the boundaries."

Dent's writing has earned him a place in anthologies of those standing outside the mainstream poetic tradition in both the UK and the USA. In 2009 he was guest poet at the Porlock Arts Festival.

== Bibliography ==
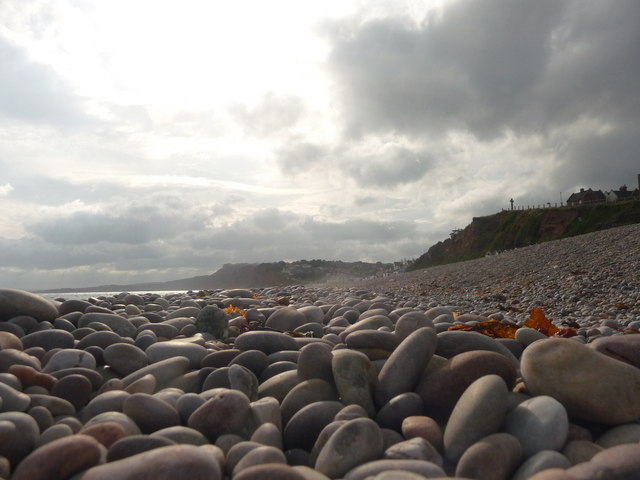
The pebble beach at Budleigh Salterton, a site for Dent's earlier meditative poetry

Poems 1972–1999

- Proxima Centauri (Agenda Editions 4) London, 1972. Edition of 450 numbered copies, ISBN 0-902400-03-7; 50 signed and numbered copies, ISBN 0-902400-04-5.
- The Time Between: poems from the Chinese and others (Hippopotamus Press) Sutton, Surrey, 1974. ISBN 0-904179-05-2; forty copies numbered and signed.
- Surfaces (Interim Press) Egham, Surrey, 1975. ISBN 0-904675-02-5; 150 copies, signed and numbered.
- "Trickle" (Kitzbühel 1972), Mandeville Press card, Hitchin, Herts, 1976.
- Focus Germanus: episodes (OASIS 23) London, 1978. ISBN 0-903375-35-4.
- Desert Psalter (Glasshouse Press) Liverpool, 1980. Illustrations by Ann Paterson; no ISBN.
- Distant Lamps (Hippopotamus Press) Sutton, Surrey, 1980. ISBN 978-0-904179-23-1; 25 copies signed and numbered, ISBN 0-904179-24-9.
- From the Flow (Taxus Press) Durham, 1983. Cover illustration by Alan Halsey. ISBN 1-85019-002-X.
- "Toys", Big Little Poems card, Melton Mowbray, Leics, 1984
- Hours (Blackthorn Press) Budleigh Salterton, Devon, 1985. Enveloped set of 12 cards with illustrations by Dent. Edition of 50; no ISBN.
- Uncloudy Wine: 12 Poems for the guises of the graal (Taxus) Durham, 1987. ISBN 1-85019-027-5
- Midwinter Nights: Four Poems (Oasis Press) London, 1988. Illustrations by Ray Seaford; ISBN 0-903375-79-6.
- Night Winds and Dice: versions and variations (Big Little Poem Books) Grimsby, S.Humberside, 1990. Cover drawing by Laurie Clark; ISBN 0-9514468-1-9.
- Vigil and Dream: A Dark Age Suite (Blackthorn Press) Budleigh Salterton, Devon, 1990. No ISBN.
- Travel Song (Morning Star Folio 2/1) Edinburgh, Scotland, 1991. Folded sheet with paper cuts by Susan Patterson, accompanied by Dent's essay "Handling The Flower: some working thoughts on poetry". 300 copies, including 26 signed and lettered by the artist and poet.
- Suggesting Blue (Single Room 1, Room Press) White Plains NY, USA, 1991. No ISBN.
- Undergrowth (Blackthorn Press) Budleigh Salterton, Devon, 1991. No ISBN.
- Contour and Grain (Blackthorn Press) Budleigh Salterton, Devon, 1991. No ISBN.
- Northwoods (Taxus Press) Exeter, Devon, 1992. ISBN 1-873012-26-8 (p/b); 1-873012-27-6 (h/b).
- Place to Place (Stingy Artist) Weymouth, Dorset, 1993. 140 copies, numbered and signed; no ISBN.
- Equinox (Oasis series 91) London, 1993. Illustrations by Ian Robinson; ISBN 0-903375-87-7.
- Line (Markings 3, Cloud) Newcastle upon Tyne, 1995. Cover illustration by Dent; ISBN 1-899799-03-6.
- Days Out (Trombone Press) Exeter, 1998. No ISBN.
- Breaking Shadows (Juniper Press) La Crosse WI, USA, 1998. 150 copies of a mini-book; no ISBN.
- At the Blue Table (Blackthorn Press) Budleigh Salterton, Devon, 1999. No ISBN.
- Simple Geometry (Oasis Books) London, 1999. ISBN 1-900996-08-1.

Poetry from 2000

- Settlement (Leafe Press) Nottingham, 2001. ISBN 0-9537634-3-9.
- Unrestricted Moment (Stride) Exeter, Devon, 2002. Cover by Kit Surrey. ISBN 1-900152-76-2.
- Adversaria (Stride) Exeter, Devon, 2004. Cover by Brian Rice. ISBN 1-900152-97-5.
- Handmade Equations: Poems 2000–04 (Shearsman) Exeter, Devon, 2005. Cover illustration by Dent. ISBN 0-907562-65-5.
- Ghost Prophecy, (Kaleidikon), 2011. Cover art by Dent. Edition of 50.
- Dasein and Scarecrow (Offline Press), 2011. Cover art by Dent. Edition of 50.
- Price-Fixing (Kaleidikon), 2011. Cover art by Dent. Edition of 50.
- With Number Plates Disguised (High Tide Editions), 2011. Cover art by Dent. Edition of 50.
- Limit Situations (Smallminded Books), Devoran, 2011. Single folded sheet.
- Repertory (Kaleidikon), 2012. Cover art by Dent. Edition of 50.
- Trickle-Down: 12 unnatural rumours (Treadmill Editions), 2012. Cover art by Dent. Edition of 50.
- Tripping Daylight (Shearsman), Bristol 2012. Cover by Michael Barnard. ISBN 9781848612341.
- Private Utopias (Oystercatcher Press), Old Hunstanton, Norfolk, 2013. Cover art by Peter Hughes. ISBN 978-1-905885-62-6.
- Retrieval Systems (Knives Forks and Spoons Press), Newton-le-Willows, Merseyside, 2014. ISBN 978-1-909443-48-8. Cover art features a sculpture by Ruth Carpenter.
- Badlands of the Real (Red Ceilings Press), New Mills, Derbyshire, 2014. Cover art by Dent. A6 chapbook in an edition of 40.
- Merryweather (Hole-and-Corner Press), 2014. Cover art by Dent. Edition of 50.
- The First Ghost Train out of Nowhere (Hole-and-Corner Press), 2015. Cover art by Dent.
- The Revival of the Inspectorate of Everything (Treadmill Editions), 2015. Cover art by Dent. Edition of 30.
- Dolly's Field (Offline Press), 2017. Cover art by Dent. Edition of 50.
- The Oort Cloud (Kaleidikon), 2017. Cover art by Dent. Edition of 50.
- Harmony in Black: sixty pieces from 2006 (Treadmill), 2017. Cover art by Dent. Edition of 50.
- Visitors' Book Rendlesham Forest, a decomposition (Knives Forks and Spoons Press), Newton-le-Willows, Merseyside, 2017. Cover image by Dylan Harris. ISBN 978-1-912211-06-7
- Lucifers (High Tide Editions), 2018. Cover art by Dent. Edition of 50.
- The Distances of Elizabeth Bowen (Brass Farthing Press). 2018. Cover art by Dent. Edition of 50.
- Stabbing in the Dark: 20 Abstract Speculations (Treadmill), 2018. Cover art by Dent. Edition of 50.
- A Wind-up Collider (Shearsman), Bristol 2019. Cover by urbanglimpses. ISBN 978-1-84861-666-0. Incorporates some pieces from the two 2015 editions.
- Mutant Summers/New Histories (Red Ceilings Press), New Mills, Derbyshire, 2019. Cover art by Dent. A6 chapbook in an edition of 40.
- Hippogryphia: 30 variables (Treadmill), 2019. Cover art by Dent.
- as nettles and ivy permit (Kaleidikon), 2020. Cover art by Dent. 32-page edition of 50.
- Yarn (Leafe Press) Nottingham, 2021. Cover photograph by Dianakc. ISBN 978-1-9999451-1-4
- Safe Whispering - 20 Poems (Treadmill), 2024. Cover art by Dent.
- Previous (High Tide Editions), 2025. Cover art by Dent.
- Quaternion Interplay (off-cutters), 2026. Cover art by Dent.
- Riverside Scuffle (Kaleidikon), 2026. Cover art by Dent.
- Fly-by-night Detail (Offline Press), 2026. Cover art and inline designs by Dent.

Shared publications

- The Elek Book of Oriental Verse, translations from Sanskrit (with David Gerow) and Urdu (with David Mathews). London, 1979. ISBN 0-236-40144-0
- Travelling the Worlds (Spacex Literature) Exeter, 1992. Joint collection with Pamela Gillilan; no ISBN.
- Daylight Illustrations (SHEARSMAN 11 – Two Devon Poets, with Harry Guest), Plymouth, 1993, pp. 6–15
- Full Sail (SHEARSMAN 18), Plymouth, 1994, pp. 2–8
- Twelve Poems (OASIS 81), London, 1996, pp. 2–4
- Calling Out in Dreams: A Moorland Meditation (Proof 1). Exeter: South West Arts, 1998. First quarter of a joint book collecting four authors. ISBN 1-874396-19-1
- "Naming Nothing", a 16-section poem included in the anthology A State of Independence (Stride Publications, Exeter, 1998), ISBN 978-1900152273
- Follow these Glimpses, with Bob Garlitz and Rupert M. Loydell. Trombone Press, Exeter, 1999. No ISBN.
- Overgrown Umbrellas, (Lost Property) Devoran, 2008. Single folded A2 sheet; poems written in collaboration with Rupert Loydell.
- Poem with Lines Stolen from Peter Dent, Rupert Loydell. Amethyst Review, 2019
