= Growing Form =

Sculpture by Moelwyn Merchant

Coordinates: 52°48′11″N 1°37′37″W

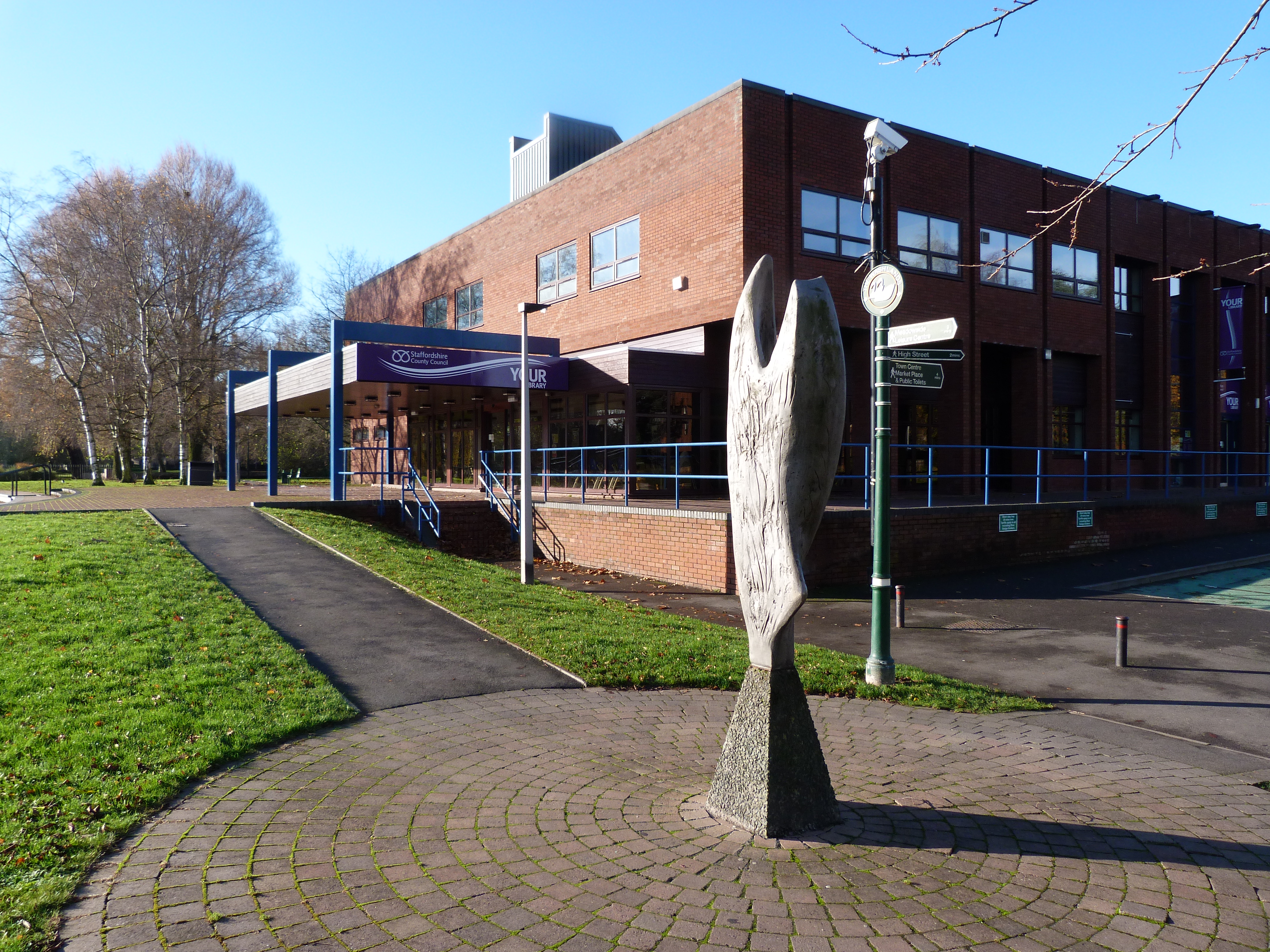
Pictured in 2012, library in background

Growing Form is a work of public art in Burton upon Trent, Staffordshire, England. It stands around 2.8 metres (9 ft 2 in) tall, with the upper portions in cast aluminium and the lower part a granite pedestal. Growing Form was commissioned by Burton & District Arts Council from sculptor Moelwyn Merchant and unveiled in 1982.

== Description ==
The sculpture is formed of a 2-metre (6 ft 7 in) tall cast aluminium body atop an 80-centimetre (31 in) high granite plinth. The plinth is in the form of a square-based pyramid with sides 53 centimetres (21 in) in length. A plaque on the pedestal gives the name of the sculpture, its sculptor (Reverend Professor Moelwyn Merchant) and the year it was installed (1982). The plaque further notes that the work was "commissioned by Burton & District Arts Council aided by West Midlands Art". It stands near to the library and the flood plain of the River Trent in Burton upon Trent. Merchant had intended the piece to be surrounded by two rows of slate columns; due to budget constraints this element was not installed and instead it was enclosed by a circle of trees. It now stands on a patch of grass adjacent to a flood defence wall and a car park.

== Interpretation ==
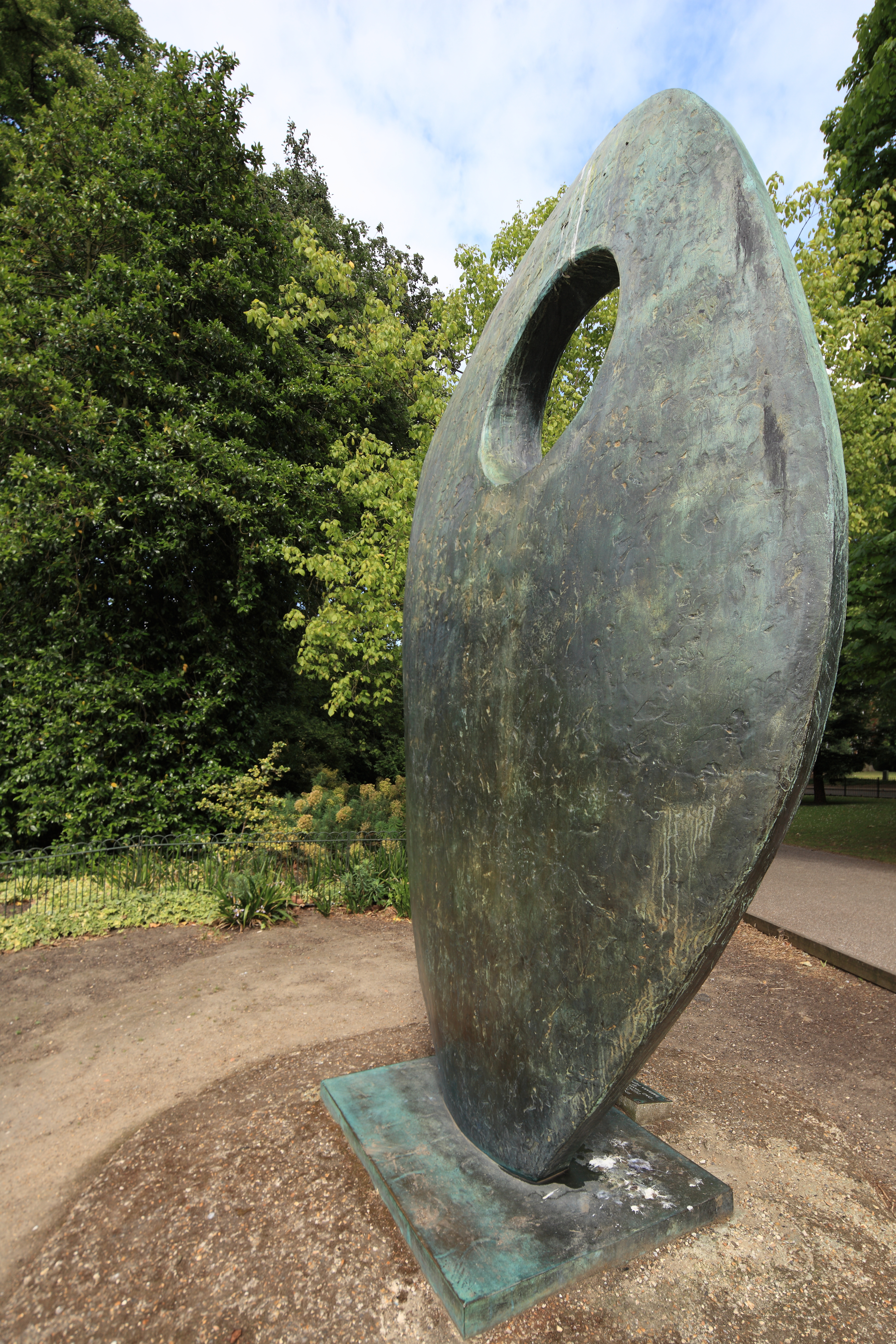
Hepworth's Single Form (Memorial) in Battersea Park, London, dating to the early 1960s

The work shows the influence of modernist sculptor Barbara Hepworth on Merchant, who was a clergyman who turned to sculpture late in life. Merchant stated that he was inspired by the river valley setting of the piece. He described it as resembling "a tulip bud with the front leaf pulled out" and that it was intended to suggest the fragility of nature. George T. Noszlopy and Fiona Waterhouse writing in 2005 described it as "symbolic of nature's struggle for life" and "reminiscent of a sprouting seed". The sculpture is the largest work completed by Merchant.

== History ==
Merchant made a number of sculptures on a similar theme based on a 6-inch (150 mm) tall pyrophyllite carving he owned. The original piece was more open in form but Merchant's sculptures in bronze, aluminium and ceramic, grew more enclosed. The Burton Arts Council commissioned Growing Form from Merchant as a development of the theme, with a focus on "growth". It was intended as the focal point of Burton Civic Society's landscaping works around the library.

Merchant produced a number of maquettes, of which one was selected for full-scale production. It took Merchant 8 months to complete, requiring 500 hours of his time to sculpt and a further 500 hours to cast and finish.

Although the £3,000 cost of the work was covered by the Burton Arts Council, West Midlands Arts and the Burton Consolidated Charities when it was unveiled on 11 September 1982 it was described as "a huge birthday present gift-wrapped from the council (East Staffordshire District Council, ESDC) to the town". The sculpture was unveiled by the chairperson of West Midlands Arts Liz Thomas who said "I think the sculpture gives the area a focal point and reminds people there are sculptors and craftsmen in the community". It was accepted on behalf of the town by ESDC councillor Joe Parker. The Burton Music Centre brass band performed at the unveiling and it was followed by a dedication service at the nearby St Modwen's Church. In October 1982 the library held an exhibition on the piece showing some of Merchant's maquettes.

The sculpture is in the ownership of East Staffordshire Borough Council (previously ESDC). Merchant's papers relating to the sculpture, dating from 1981 to 1982, are in the collection of the Eton College archives.
