= Philip Hoy =

English publisher, editor, book designer, and author

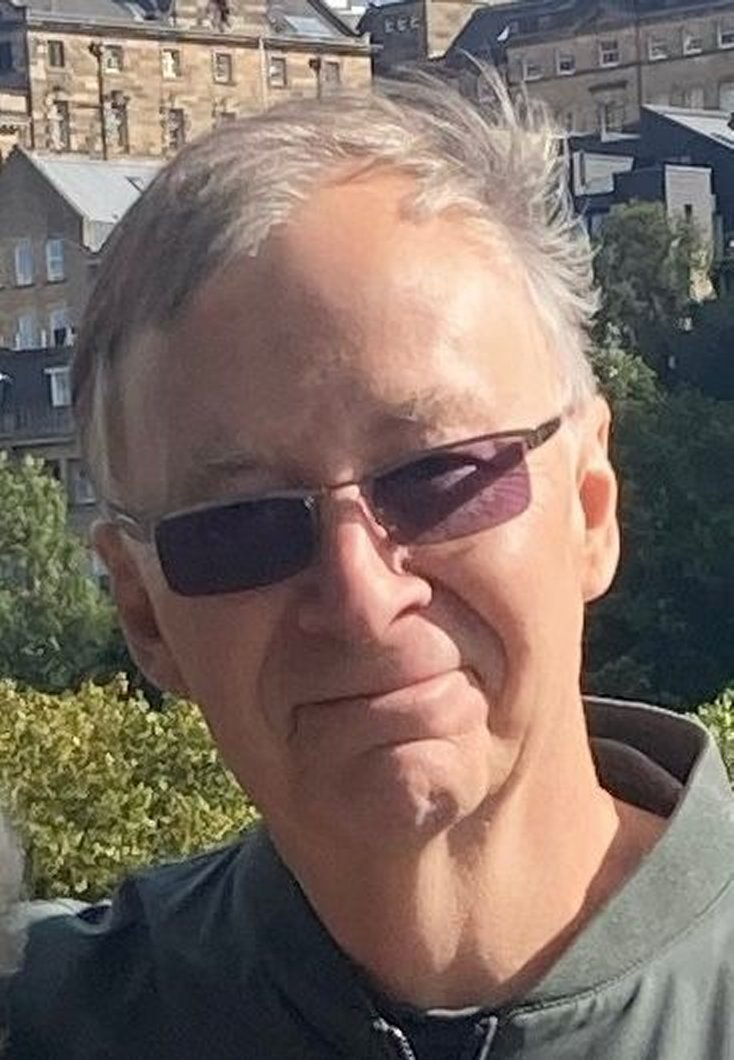
- Born: 1952 (age 73–74)
- Occupations: Publisher, editor, book designer, author
- Writing career
- Notable works: Founder of The Waywiser Press and editor of Anthony Hecht's poems

Philip Hoy (born 1952) is an English publisher, editor, book designer, and author. He is notably recognized as the founder of The Waywiser Press and the editor of Anthony Hecht's poems.

== Early life and education ==
Hoy obtained a BA from the University of York and a PhD in philosophy from the University of Leeds. His doctoral thesis was titled A Defence of Scepticism: A Refutation of Some Contemporary Anti-Sceptical Arguments.

== Career ==
In 1998, Hoy co-founded Between The Lines, a small press focusing on publishing book-length interviews with contemporary poets, along with Peter Dale and Ian Hamilton. The editorial board was later joined by J. D. McClatchy, then the editor of The Yale Review. This series featured well-known poets such as John Ashbery, Thom Gunn, Donald Hall, Seamus Heaney, Anthony Hecht, Donald Justice, Charles Simic, Richard Wilbur, and W.D. Snodgrass.

In 2002, Hoy established The Waywiser Press, a publishing platform that continues to produce new works to date. The press has published renowned poets including Richard Wilbur, Mark Strand, and Anthony Hecht, extending beyond contemporary poetry to novels, short stories, memoirs, letters, aphorisms, and literary history.

Hoy introduced the annual Anthony Hecht Poetry Prize in 2005, offering the winning poet publication of their collection and a $3,000 award.

In 2022, Hoy published the essay M. Degas Steps Out, receiving positive reviews. The essay is a 96-page meditation on a nine-second sequence of black and white film capturing French artist Edgar Degas walking along a Parisian boulevard.

Hoy edited Anthony Hecht’s Collected Poems, the hardback and audiobook editions of which were published in November 2023 by Alfred A. Knopf.

== Personal life ==
Hoy was born in London in 1952. He lives with his wife, the violinist Philippa Ibbotson, in rural West Oxfordshire.

== Select publications ==
- [Editor] Anthony Hecht’s Collected Poems (Alfred A. Knopf, 2023).
- M. Degas Steps Out (Waywiser Press, 2022).
- “Joseph Conrad on the Merchant Service’s War Effort (1918): A First Publication Discovered” (The Conradian, 44:1, spring 2019).
- [Editor] A Bountiful Harvest: The Correspondence of Anthony Hecht and William L. MacDonald (Waywiser, 2018).
- “The Transatlantic Disconnect” (The Warwick Review, September 2013).
- W.D. Snodgrass in Conversation with Philip Hoy (Between The Lines, London, 1998).
- Anthony Hecht in Conversation with Philip Hoy (Between The Lines, London, 1999, 2001).
- Donald Justice in Conversation with Philip Hoy (Between The Lines, London, 2001).
- [Foreword] Anthony’s Hecht, Interior Skies: Late Poems from Liguria (Two Ponds Press, 2011).

== Interviews ==
- [Interview: Philip Hoy and Stephen Yenser in conversation with Poetry East’s Maitreyabandhu, the subject being Anthony Hecht’s “The Venetian Vespers” and James Merrill’s The Book of Yolek.
- [Interview; Between the Lines]. “The Interviewer Interviewed: N.S Thompson talks to Philip Hoy, Editor of Between The Lines”, The Dark Horse, 15, Summer 2003: 40-46.
- [Interview; The Waywiser Press]. "Scenes: The Waywiser Press: An Interview with Philip Hoy." American Book Review, vol. 42, no. 6 (Sept/Oct 2021).
