= Stanley Moss =

American poet, publisher, and art dealer (1925–2024)

- Born: Stanley David Moskowitz; June 21, 1925; Woodhaven, New York, U.S
- Died: July 5, 2024 (aged 99); New City, New York, U.S.
- Citizenship: American
- Children: Tobia Milla Moss
- Writing career
- Language: English
- Genre: Poetry

Stanley Moss (June 21, 1925 – July 5, 2024) was an American poet, publisher, and art dealer.

== Life and work ==
Moss was born in Woodhaven, New York, on June 21, 1925, as Stanley David Moskowitz. His father was a high school principal. The family was non-religious, but occasionally celebrated Jewish holidays. A tour of Southern Europe and the Middle East at the age of eight, described in the essay "Satyr Song," greatly affected Moss, exposing him to European painting, Levantine culture, and geopolitics.

Moss was hired as an editorial assistant at New Directions in 1949. His first book of poems, The Wrong Angel, was published in 1966. He is the author of sixteen other books of poems: The Skull of Adam (1979), The Intelligence of Clouds (1989), Asleep in the Garden (1997), A History of Color (2003), New & Selected Poems 2006, and God Breaketh Not All Men's Hearts Alike: New & Later Collected Poems (2011).

Moss was married twice and had one son, Tobia Milla Moss, who lives and works in Italy. On July 5, 2024, he died at a rehabilitation center in New City, New York, at the age of 99.

In the book Juan Carlos Arias, "El falsificador de Franco" (2023) he is accused in selling multiple art forgeries of Spanish paintings to various persons including Algur H. Meadows and museums including Prado.

== Bibliography ==
=== Poetry ===
Collections

- The Wrong Angel, Macmillan (1966); Anvil Press (1969)
- The Skull of Adam, Horizon Press (1979); Anvil Press (1979)
- The Intelligence of Clouds, Harcourt Brace Jovanovich (1989); Anvil Press (1989)
- Asleep in the Garden, Seven Stories Press (1997); Anvil Press (1998)
- A History of Color, Seven Stories Press (2003)
- Songs of Imperfection, Anvil Press (2004)
- New & Selected Poems, Seven Stories Press (2006)
- Rejoicing: New and Collected Poems, Anvil Press (2009)
- God Breaketh Not All Men's Hearts Alike: New & Later Collected Poems, Seven Stories Press (2011)
- No Tear Is Commonplace, Carcanet (2013)
- It's About Time, Hopewell (2015); Carcanet (2015)
- Almost Complete Poems, Seven Stories Press (2016); Carcanet (2017)
- Abandoned Poems, Seven Stories Press (2018)
- Act V Scene I, Seven Stories Press (2020)
- Not Yet. Poems on China etc., Seven Stories Press (2022)

Goddamned Selected Poems, Carcanet (2024)

Soon: Collected Poems, Sheep Meadow Press (2024)

List of poems

Title	Year	First published	Reprinted/collected
I'm sorry	2019	"I'm sorry". The New Yorker. Vol. 95, no. 13. May 20, 2019. p. 49.	

=== As editor ===
- Trilce by César Vallejo, translated by Rebecca Seiferle, Sheep Meadow Press (1992)
- Interviews and Encounters with Stanley Kunitz, Sheep Meadow Press (1993)
- To Stanley Kunitz, with Love: From Poet Friends: For His 96th Birthday, Sheep Meadow Press (2002)
- A Book for Daniel Stern: By Friends, co-edited with Pamela M. Diamond, Sheep Meadow Press (2006)
- Last Day of the Year: Selected Poems by Michael Krüger, translated by Karen J. Leeder and Richard Dove, Sheep Meadow Press (2014)
