= Anne Beresford =

British poet (1928–2023)

- Born: Anne Ellen File; 10 September 1928; Redhill, Surrey, England
- Died: 14 July 2023 (aged 94); Knodishall, Suffolk, England
- Occupations: Poet, teacher, broadcaster
- Spouse: Michael Hamburger (m. 1951–1967) Michael Hamburger (m. 1974)
- Children: 3
- Writing career
- Pen name: Anne Beresford
- Period: 1967–2006
- Genre: Poetry

Anne Ellen File (10 September 1928 – 14 July 2023) known by her pen-name Anne Beresford, was a British poet. Her poetry explored themes of spirituality, mortality, and the fragility of daily life.

== Early life and education ==
Anne Beresford was born in Redhill, Surrey, England. Her father, Richmond File, was a travelling salesman who sold films, while her mother, Margaret (née Kent), played piano for silent films and trombone in ladies' orchestras. As a child, Beresford modelled for advertisements for soap products such as Persil. She developed a love of reading early on, particularly enjoying Tales from Shakespeare by Charles and Mary Lamb.

At the age of 15, she was accepted to the Central School of Speech Training and Dramatic Art, then based at the Royal Albert Hall. There she discovered the poetry of Gerard Manley Hopkins and Wilfred Owen, and her interest in acting waned as her attention to poetry grew.

== Career ==
Her first collection of poetry was published in 1967 under the title Walking without Moving. Over the next four decades, she published fourteen collections culminating with Collected Poems 1967–2006. Her work often drew inspiration from the open skies of Suffolk and her "odd and macabre imagination".

In addition to writing poetry, Beresford taught drama at schools in London and Wimbledon during the late 1960s and early 1970s. She also led workshops at the Cockpit Theatre in Marylebone.

=== Writing style ===
Anne Beresford's poetry is characterised by its contemplative tone and ethereal quality. Critics have described her work as mystical but grounded in daily life. Playwright David Storey noted that her poems resembled "a devotional 'book of hours', mystical in its origins, religious in its aspirations". Mortality was a recurring theme throughout her work.

Her style often included vivid imagery drawn from nature alongside explorations of human consciousness. She balanced spiritual themes with reflections on personal experiences and societal changes.

== Personal life ==
Anne met German-born poet and translator Michael Hamburger at a Christmas dinner organised by her elder sister Elizabeth. Hamburger had escaped Nazi persecution and served in the British Army during World War II. Six months after meeting, they married in 1951. The couple initially lived in Suffolk in a farmhouse surrounded, alongside their two cats named Pushkin and Trotsky.

They divorced in 1967 but remarried in 1974. Together they had three children: Mary Anne (a retired teacher and visual artist), Richard (a dealer in first edition books), and Claire (a counsellor, visual artist, poet, and musician). After Hamburger's death in 2007, Beresford moved to Knodishall, Suffolk, where she hosted gatherings for poetry readings, music performances, theological discussions, and play-readings. Beresford died on 14 July 2023 at the age of 94 in Knodishall, Suffolk.

== Works ==
=== Poetry collections ===
Sources:

- Walking without Moving (1967)
- The Lair (1968)
- The Courtship (1972)
- Footsteps on Snow (1972)
- Modern Fairy Tale (1972)
- The Curving Shore (1975)
- Unholy Giving (1978)
- Songs a Thracian Taught Me (1980)
- The Sele of the Morning (1988)
- Snapshots from an Album 1884–1895 (1992)
- Charm with Stones (1993)
- Landscape with Figures (1994)
- Duet for Three Voices and Coda (1997)
- Selected Poems (1997)
- No Place for Cowards (1998)
- Hearing Things (2002)
- Collected Poems 1967–2006 (2006)

=== Other works ===
- Translation: Vera Lungu's Alexandros: Selected Poems (1975)
- Radio plays: including Struck by Apollo (1965) and The Villa (1968), co-written with Michael Hamburger
