= A False Start: London Poems 1959–1963 =

Collection of poems by Peter Russell

Cover of A False Start showing the author with Peter Whigham in Castelfranco in July 1986

A False Start: London Poems 1959–1963 is a collection of poems by Peter Russell. It was published by the University of Salzburg in 1993 (ISBN 3705209272).
