= Moelwyn Merchant =

Welsh academic (1913–1997)

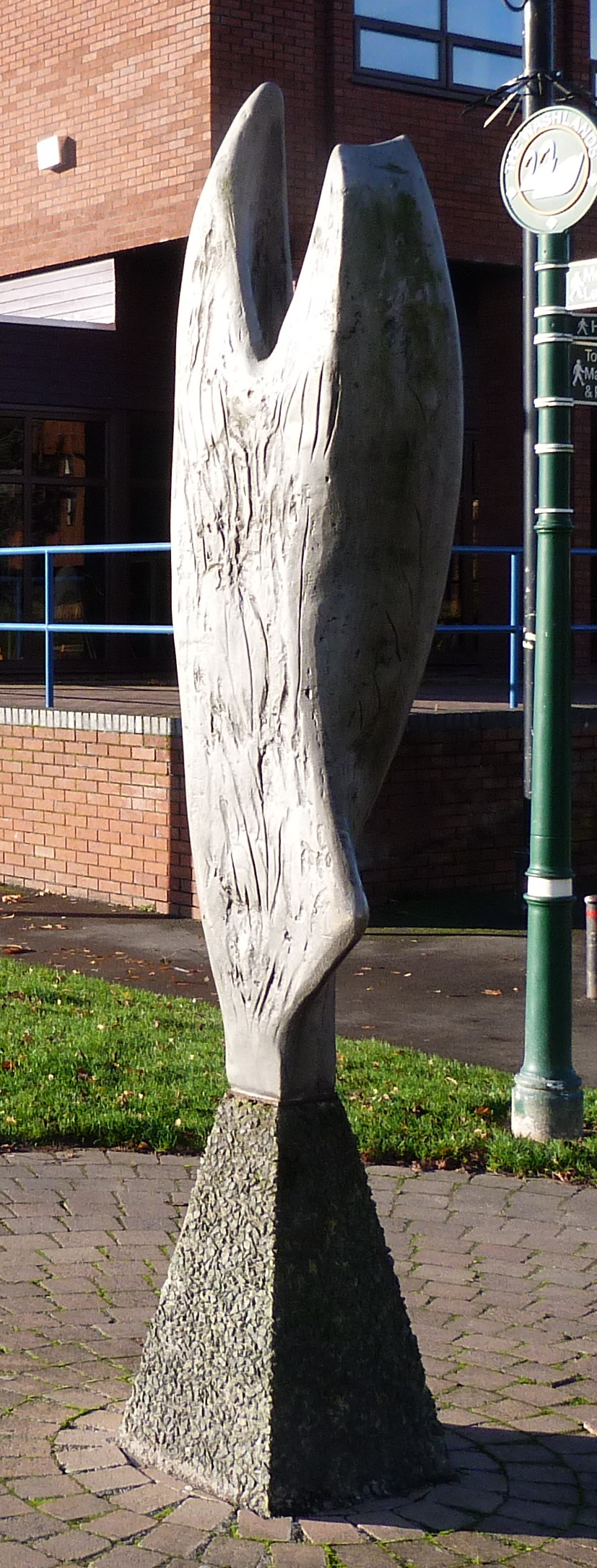
Growing Form (1982) in Burton upon Trent

William Moelwyn Merchant (5 June 1913 – 22 April 1997) was a Welsh academic, novelist, sculptor, poet and Anglican priest.

== Life and career ==
He was born in Port Talbot, Glamorgan, Wales, and his first language was Welsh. He was educated at University College, Cardiff (BA 1933). He died in retirement at Leamington Spa.

After teaching at Queen Elizabeth Grammar School, Carmarthen, Caerleon Teacher Training College and University College Cardiff, in 1961 Merchant was appointed Professor and Head of Department of English at the University of Exeter. He was responsible for the beginnings of the study of Drama at the university. He left Exeter in 1974 to teach briefly at the University of Chicago. As an academic, he is best known for his widely used editions of Shakespeare.

In addition to his academic work, Merchant was active in the Church of England having been ordained in 1940. From 1967 to 1971 he was Canon and Chancellor of Salisbury Cathedral. In 1975 he returned to Wales to become vicar of Llandewibrefi near Tregaron. Late in life he wrote a series of fictionalised accounts of biblical stories, including biographies of Jesus (Jeshua: Nazareth to Jerusalem), Elijah (Fire from the heights) and Paul (A bundle of papyrus), and a treatment of the early history of the Israelites, Inherit the land.

Merchant published a number of books of poetry, including Breaking the Code (1975), No Dark Glass (1979) and Confrontation of Angels (1986), and also wrote libretti for Alun Hoddinott. The BBC made a film about him, Vicar of a Country Parish.

Merchant took to sculpture relatively late in life. He was strongly influenced by his close friend Barbara Hepworth. He had numerous solo shows, and also exhibited jointly with Josef Herman; his work is still in demand. Examples of it stand on the campuses of the Universities of Stirling (Growing Form), Cardiff (British Triad), Exeter (Ascending Form and Tension) and Warwick (Triad); at the Margam sculpture park at Port Talbot; and in All Saints' Church, Leamington Spa (Confrontation of Angels). He donated Ascending Form to the University of Exeter after his retirement, and both this and Tension now form part of the "Sculpture Walk" through the university campus, along with a piece of Hepworth's, which Merchant was instrumental in obtaining for the university.

== Works ==
Shakespeare and the Artist, Oxford University Press, 1959.
