= Leonello Tarabella =

Italian composer

Leonello Tarabella (born in Forte dei Marmi, Italy in 1948) is an Italian researcher, musician and composer. His activity runs on the academic/artistic double track.

== Biography ==
Graduated in Computer Science at University of Pisa, during the '70s he started his research work under the direction of M° Pietro Grossi who was pioneering Computer Music at the CNR (National Counsel of Research) in Pisa, Italy. Later, as a study grant holder, he specialized on the technology of computer music at the EMS (Electronic Music Studio), MIT-Boston and at CCRMA (Center for Computer Research on Music and Acoustics), Stanford University.

In his research activity at CNR in Pisa he designed and carried out languages for algorithmic composition and natural gesture recognition systems and devices for giving expression to interactive electro-acoustic music; to be quoted two of them he currently uses in his performances: PalmDriver, based on infrared beams technology and Handel, based on realtime processing of video captured images. As a musician he composes and performs with these systems his own computer music: Madrid, The Netherlands, Shanghai, Thessaloniki, New York, New Orleans, La Habana, Barcelona, Paris, Bourges, Venezia (Biennale), Kopenhagen, Utrecht, Esbjerg, Boston, Bratislava, Dublin, Istanbul, Athens...

As s professor at the Computer Science Faculty of Pisa's university, he used (1990-2012) to teach computer music and to be supervisor of a number of degree-thesis. He published many scientific articles also participating to many editions of International Conferences on computer music. Besides, he published 2 books: “Informatica e Musica” Jackson Libri (1992) and “Musica Informatica, filosofia, storia e tecnologia della computer music” Maggioli/Apogeo (2014).

He organized events, workshops and European projects such as: -International WS on man-machine interaction in live performance; -Interactive Arts in Italy, (collaboration with Summer Music Program, New York University); - Third International Symposium CMMR 2005, Computer Music Modeling and Retrieval”; - MOSART (Music Orchestration System in Algorithmic Research and Technology, HPRN-CT-2000-00115; - MODEM, Music Open Distance Exchange Model, Programma Leonardo da Vinci nr. I/05/B/F/PP-154059.

He has been invited both as speaker and performer at national RAI-TV networks (Mediamente, Futura City,..) and at many editions of “La notte dei Ricercatori” (Pisa, Roma, La Spezia, Ferrara, Livorno...) and "Festival della Scienza", Genova and recently at RomeCUP, TEDxArezzo, TEDxUniversityofLuxembourg.

Thanks to a collaboration with the Steinhardt School of New York University he has been invited at Interactive ART Festival'99 and NYCElectronic Music Festival'13 in New York, Tulane University in New Orleans. With Lucrezia de Domizio, curator of artist Joseph Beuys's opera, he has been present in many Contemporary Art events such as La Biennale di Venezia (49a e 53a), ArsAevi Museum di Sarajevo.

On the occasion of the Centenary of the first radio telegraphy transmission across the Atlantic by Guglielmo Marconi (Celebrazioni Marconiane, 2001) he was awarded the “Premio Marconi 2002 per l’Arte Tecnologica” for the electro-acoustic opera “KITE”. After researches on the peculiar reverberation characteristics of the Pisa's Baptistry, he composed the concert “SiderisVOX” where the monument is considered a “musical instrument” using computer generated anechoic sounds (June 2006 and June 2016).

Recently he started the project “Collisions” together with Alessandro Baris (percussionist and composer) realizing a set/concert in the consumer/avant-garde music area: Collisions has been performed in many Contemporary Art and Music Festivals such as roBOt Festival, Bologna, Dancity (Foligno) and Electropark (Genova).

== Music ==
- Expanding Horizons, CD, Capstone Records CPS-8630, B000001YV4
- SUØN1, CD, EMA Records, SIAE elinEMAR001
- SpringUP, DVD - performance multimediale, SIAE F40004708506
- COLLISIONS: DVD, EMA Records, Siae: elinEMAR002
- roBOT Festival (video)
- Masses and Seamotion (video)

== Books ==
- Informatica e Musica, Jackson Libri, 1992.
- Interface, Journal of New Music Research, (Guest Editor) Vol. 22 n. 1, Swets & Zeitlinger B.V., 1993.
- Musica Informatica, storia, filosofia e tecnologia della computer music, Apogeo/Maggioli, 2014.

== Quotations ==
IEEE Spectrum, Dec. 1997. Electronic Music Interfaces, New ways to play, J.Paradiso. The Times, 9 dic.1999, pag.20. The Herald Tribune, 1999. New York Times, 13 aprile 1999. Panorama, n. 30, 2001. Newton n. 7, 2000. Machine Musicianship, Robert Rowe, The MIT Press, 2002. Deotisalvi, L’architetto del secolo d'oro. Pierotti P., Benassi L., Pacini Editore, 2002. Servizio televisivo trasmissione FuturaCity, RAI, 2004.

== See also ==
- Pietro Grossi
- Computer Music
- Electronic Music
