= Caroline Wright =

British biochemist

Caroline Fiona Wright
- Education: University of Cambridge
- Scientific career
- Workplaces: University of Exeter; Wellcome Sanger Institute
- Thesis: Folding and aggregation of an immunoglobulin domain (2004)

Caroline Fiona Wright is a British biological chemist who is Professor of Genomic Medicine at the University of Exeter. Her research is focused on how to use genome-wide sequencing technology for the diagnosis of rare diseases. She was elected to the Academy of Medical Sciences in 2025.

== Early life and education ==
Wright studied natural sciences at the University of Cambridge, where she focussed on biological chemistry. She matriculated in 1997. Her doctoral research investigated the aggregation of immunoglobulin domains.

== Research and career ==
Wright joined The PHG (Population Health Genomics) Foundation in 2007, a think tank in Cambridge that looks to understand how emerging technologies (including genomics) can provide more effective healthcare and improve patient's lives.

Wright joined the Wellcome Sanger Institute in 2011. At Sanger she managed the Deciphering Developmental Disorders project, a translational research study that makes use of exome sequencing to understand undiagnosed developmental disorders. Genome sequencing, which is now offered on the National Health Service, can improve the quality of life of children with development disorders. She was briefly seconded part-time to Genomics England where she was scientific lead for the 100,000 Genomes Project. In particular, Wright led on variant discovery and clinical interpretation.

Wright joined the University of Exeter in 2017, where she was made a Personal Chair in Genomic Medicine in 2020. She has worked on using genome sequencing techniques to diagnose rare diseases, and understanding penetrance in populations. She looks to understand rare disease-causing variants in genes, applied in both diagnostic and screening contexts.

In 2025, Wright was elected Fellow of the Academy of Medical Sciences.

== Selected publications ==
- Sebastian Köhler; Sandra C Doelken; Christopher J. Mungall; et al. (January 2014). "The Human Phenotype Ontology project: linking molecular biology and disease through phenotype data". Nucleic Acids Research. 42 (Database issue): D966-74. doi:10.1093/nar/gkt1026. ISSN 0305-1048. PMC 3965098. PMID 24217912. Wikidata Q27927005.
- Caroline F Wright; Tomas W Fitzgerald; Wendy D Jones; et al. (17 December 2014). "Genetic diagnosis of developmental disorders in the DDD study: a scalable analysis of genome-wide research data". The Lancet. 385 (9975): 1305–1314. doi:10.1016/s0140-6736(14)61705-0. ISSN 0140-6736. PMC 4392068. PMID 25529582. Wikidata Q30881351.
- Caroline F Wright; David R FitzPatrick; Helen V Firth (19 February 2018). "Paediatric genomics: diagnosing rare disease in children". Nature Reviews Genetics. doi:10.1038/nrg.2018.12. ISSN 1471-0056. PMID 29456250. Wikidata Q49886189.
