= William Cookson (poet) =

British poet and literary editor (1939–2003)

William Cookson (8 May 1939–2 January 2003) was a British poet, writer on poetry and literary editor, best known for his poetry magazine Agenda, regarded as one of the most influential of its age.

He was brought up in Surrey and London, and educated at Westminster School and New College, Oxford. At 16, he started a correspondence with Ezra Pound, who started mentoring him and introducing him to his network of contacts. In October 1958, aged 19, he travelled to Italy to meet him, and as a result of this visit, decided to become an editor, launching his magazine Agenda, in January 1959. Initially, Agenda continued Pound's economic and political ideas at the time of composing Thrones (1959). However, after a year of experimenting, Cookson reoriented his magazine towards contemporary poetry, and stayed faithful to this direction until his death in 2003. Politically, he became a socialist. In artistic terms, Cookson remained devoted to Pound throughout his life, and his magazine is an important link in the reception of Pound's poetry in the UK. This should not obscure the main merit of Agenda, namely that it followed the development of late modernist poetry in Britain and America, correlating it both with tradition and with poetries all over the world, through translations, reviews and essays. Cookson dedicated whole issues of Agenda to key British poets such as David Jones, Geoffrey Hill, Thom Gunn and Basil Bunting, building reference points for their poetry.

Cookson also edited a volume of Pound's Selected Prose (1973), and published A Guide to The Cantos of Ezra Pound (1985, 2001).

On Cookson's death a "Celebratory Issue" of Agenda (Vol. 39, No. 4 (2003)) was published in which his successor as editor of the journal, Patricia McCarthy, described him as "a man who sacrificed his life for poetry and was perhaps the best, most single-minded editor of our day". In addition to a final redaction of "Vestiges and Versions", the issue contains biographical sketches by Edmund Gray and Martin Dodsworth.

== Selected publications ==
(As critic)

- A Guide to The Cantos of Ezra Pound (1985; Revised Edition, 2001)
- (Note: An Introduction to David Jones was announced but not seemingly published.)

(As editor)

- Ezra Pound: Selected Prose 1909-1965 (Faber, 1973)
- Agenda - An Anthology 1959-1993 (Carcanet Press, 1994)

(As poet)

- Dream Traces (Hippopotamus Press, 1975)
- Spell (Agenda Editions, 1986)
- Vestiges (Agenda Editions/Big Little Poems, 1987)
- Vestiges & Versions 1955-1996 (Agenda Editions/Poet and Painters Press, 1997)
