= Heather Buck =

English poet (1926–2004)

- Born: Heather Entwistle; 1926; Kent, England
- Died: 2004 (aged 77–78)
- Spouse: Hadley Buck
- Writing career
- Genre: Poetry

Heather Buck (1926–2004), born Heather Entwistle, was an English poet.

== Life ==
She was born in 1926 in Kent, England. In 1952, she married Hadley Buck and they had two children. During her life, she had many careers, including cartographer for the War Department in London from 1942 to 1945; town planner for Ministry of Town and Country Planning in London from 1945 to 1947, in the Essex County Planning Department in Chelmsford from 1947 to 1949, and for the London County Council from 1949 to 1952. She started writing poetry in 1966, after she participated in Jungian analysis. She died in 2004.

== Influences ==
Buck identified her major influences as T.S. Eliot, followed by Wallace Stevens and Rainer Rilke.

== Works ==
=== Poetry ===
- The Opposite Direction. London, Outposts Publications, 1971, ISBN 978-0720501322
- At the Window. London, Anvil Press, 1982, ISBN 978-0856460715
- The Sign of the Water Bearer. London, and Wolfeboro, New Hampshire, Anvil Press, 1987, ISBN 978-0856461934
- Psyche Unbound. London, Anvil Press, 1995, ISBN 978-0856462603
- Waiting for the Ferry. London, Anvil Press, 1998, ISBN 978-0856463082

=== Other ===
- T.S. Eliot's Four Quartets (essay). London, Agenda Editions, 1996, ISBN 978-0902400580
