= Leonello Rabatti =

Italian poet and critic (born 1960)

Leonello Rabatti (born 7 November 1960, Reggello, Italy) is an Italian poet and critic. He lives in Prato and has privately published two volumes of poetry. He received a degree in Modern Literature from the University of Florence.

Rabatti has contributed poetry and prose to several Italian magazines, including "Semicerchio","Collettivo R", "Pietraserena", "Hebenon", "Spiritualità e letteratura." He has also participated in various poetry and musical events in Florence and elsewhere in Italy.

== Selected works ==
- Limite del silenzio (1992)
- Destino (1995).

=== Poetry included in anthologies ===
- Poeti di Novecento (1994)
- Nostos – Poeti degli anni Novanta a Firenze (1997)
