= Peter Levi =

English writer, archaeologist, and priest (1931–2000)

Peter Levi FSA FRSL
- Born: Peter Chad Tigar Levi; 16 May 1931; Ruislip, England
- Died: 1 February 2000 (aged 68); Frampton-on-Severn, Gloucestershire, England
- Education: Heythrop College, Campion Hall
- Writing career
- Genre: Poetry

Peter Chad Tigar Levi FSA FRSL (16 May 1931, in Ruislip – 1 February 2000, in Frampton-on-Severn) was an English poet, archaeologist, Jesuit priest, travel writer, biographer, academic and prolific reviewer and critic. He was Professor of Poetry at the University of Oxford (1984–1989).

== Early life and education ==
Levi was born in Ruislip, Middlesex. The family of his father (Herbert Simon Levi) came from Istanbul and that of his mother (Edith Mary Tigar) was English. His mother was a devout Roman Catholic and his Jewish father converted to that religion; their three children all entered religious orders.

He was educated in private Catholic establishments starting at Prior Park near Bath, run by the Christian Brothers. When he was 14, Oscar Wilde had become his literary idol. Wilde had said that the Greek text of the Gospels was the most beautiful book in the world, so a school with more Greek was demanded and he changed schools to Beaumont College, a Jesuit school in Old Windsor, Berkshire. While at Beaumont, at the age of 17 he joined the Society of Jesus as a novice. He was to remain a Jesuit until he resigned the priesthood 29 years later in 1977. Levi trained for the priesthood at Heythrop College and read Classics at Campion Hall. During his teenage years he suffered from polio and as an undergraduate was knocked down by a car – the after-effects of these were to affect him throughout his life.

While at Heythrop, then a country house near Chipping Norton in Oxfordshire, he was not the most ruly of seminarians. This and possible doubts about his vocation led to his ordination being delayed for a year:

"We used to translate psalm [119] Beati immaculati in via at Heythrop as Blessed are those who are not spotted on the way out. I was spotted too often...."

This delay had the side effect of enabling his first visit to Greece in 1963. He travelled through Afghanistan with Bruce Chatwin in 1970, looking for traces of Greek culture.

== After the priesthood ==
He left the priesthood in 1977. He subsequently married Deirdre Craig (granddaughter of Lord Craigavon), widow of Cyril Connolly.

He spent a year as archaeological correspondent for The Times before returning to academic life. In 1984, he was elected Oxford Professor of Poetry, an appointment requiring only a minimal number of public lectures.

In 1988, he claimed to have found a previously unknown poem by William Shakespeare in a manuscript at the Huntington Library in San Marino, California. However, the claim has not been accepted by most scholars.

== Works ==
Most of this data retrieved from British Library catalogue July 2006.

=== Poetry ===
- 1960: The Gravel Ponds. London: Andre Deutsch.
- 1962: Water, Rock and Sand. London: Andre Deutsch.
- 1965: The Shearwaters. Clive Allison (Harlequin Poets). In Longer Contemporary Poems (ed. David Wright, 1966). Penguin Books. ISBN 978-0140420876
- 1966: Fresh Water, Sea Water. London: Black Raven Press.
- 1968: Ruined Abbeys. Northwood: Anvil Press.
- 1968: Pancakes for the Queen of Babylon. Northwood: Anvil Press.
- 1970: Ο τόνος της φωνής του Σεφέρη (Mr Seferis' Tone of Voice).
- 1971: Death is a Pulpit. London: Anvil Press. ISBN 0-900977-69-8.
- 1971: Life is a Platform. London: Anvil Press. ISBN 0-900977-66-3.
- 1973: in Penguin Modern Poets vol 22. Harmondsworth: Penguin.
- 1976: Collected Poems, 1955–1975. London: Anvil Press. ISBN 0-85646-022-2.
- 1977: The Noise Made by Poems. London: Anvil Press. ISBN 0-85646-026-5
- 1978: Five ages. London: Anvil Press. ISBN 0-85646-036-2
- 1979: Comfort at Fifty for my brother. Pamphlet.
- 1980?: Music of dark tones. (With an engraving by Simon Brett.) Marlborough: Paulinus Press.
- 1981: Private Ground. London: Anvil Press. ISBN 0-85646-080-X.
- 1983: The Echoing Green: Three Elegies. London: Anvil Press. ISBN 0-85646-111-3.
- 1985: Shakespeare's Birthday. London: Anvil Press. ISBN 0-85646-142-3
- 1989: Shadow and Bone: Poems 1981–1988. London: Anvil Press. ISBN 0-85646-211-X.
- 1994: The Rags of Time. London: Anvil Press. ISBN 0-85646-258-6.
- 1997: Reed Music. London: Anvil Press. ISBN 0-85646-279-9.
- 2001: Viriditas. London: Anvil Press. ISBN 0-85646-331-0.

=== Autobiography and travel ===
- 1980: The Hill of Kronos. Collins. ISBN 0-00-216162-1.
- 1984: The Light Garden of the Angel King: Journeys in Afghanistan. Harmondsworth: Penguin. ISBN 0-14-009525-X
- 1996: A Bottle in the Shade: a Journey in the Western Peloponnese. London: Sinclair-Stevenson. ISBN 1-85619-588-0.

=== Greece and the ancient world ===
- Levi, Peter (1980). Atlas of the Greek world. Oxford: Phaidon. ISBN 0-7148-2044-X.
- Levi, Peter and Porter, Eliot (1981). The Greek World. London: Aurum. ISBN 0-906053-24-2
- Levi, Peter (1985). A History of Greek Literature. Harmondsworth: Viking (Penguin). ISBN 0-670-80100-3.
- Brewster, Harry (1997). The River Gods of Greece: Myths and Mountain Waters in the Hellenic World. London: I.B. Tauris. ISBN 1-86064-207-1. (Preface by Peter Levi).

=== Biography and literature ===
- Levi, Peter (1961). Beaumont, 1861–1961. London: Andre Deutsch.
- Pope, Alexander. Ed. Peter Levi (1974). Pope. Selected by Peter Levi. Harmondsworth: Penguin. ISBN 0-14-042174-2.
- Levi, Peter (1983). The Flutes of Autumn. (Autobiography). London: Harvill. ISBN 0-00-216246-6.
- Boswell, James, and Johnson, Samuel. Ed. Peter Levi (1984). A Journey to the Western Islands of Scotland and the Journal of a Tour to the Hebrides. Harmondsworth: Penguin. ISBN 0-14-043221-3.
- Levi, Peter (1988). The life and times of William Shakespeare. London: Macmillan. ISBN 0-333-43584-2.
- Levi, Peter (1988). A Private Commission: new verses by Shakespeare. London: Macmillan. ISBN 0-333-47655-7.
- Levi, Peter (1989). Goodbye to the Art of Poetry. London: Anvil Press. ISBN 0-85646-212-8.
- Levi, Peter (1990). Boris Pasternak. London: Hutchinson. ISBN 0-09-173886-5.
- Levi, Peter (1993). Tennyson. Macmillan. ISBN 0-333-52205-2.
- Levi, Peter (1995). Edward Lear: a biography. London: Macmillan. ISBN 0-333-58804-5.
- Levi, Peter (1996). Eden Renewed: the public and private life of John Milton. London: Macmillan. ISBN 0-333-62071-2.
- Levi, Peter (1997). Horace: a life. London: Duckworth (2001). ISBN 0-7156-3136-5.
- Levi, Peter (1998). Virgil: his life and times. London: Duckworth. ISBN 0-7156-2833-X

=== Translations ===
- Yevtushenko, Yevgeny. Trans. Peter Levi and Robin Milner-Gulland (1966). Poems: chosen by the author.London: Collins and Harvill.
- Pausanias. Trans. Peter Levi (1971). Guide to Greece (2 vols: Central and Southern Greece). Harmondsworth: Penguin. ISBN 0-14-044226-X
- The Bible. Trans. Peter Levi (1976). The Psalms. Harmondsworth: Penguin. ISBN 0-14-044319-3.
- Pavlopoulos, George. Trans. Peter Levi (1977). The cellar. London: Anvil Press. ISBN 0-85646-027-3.
- Papadiamantis, Alexandros. Trans. Peter Levi (1983). The murderess. London: Writers and Readers. ISBN 0-904613-94-1
- Unknown. Trans. Anne Pennington and Peter Levi (1984). Marko the Prince: Serbo-Croat heroic songs. London: Duckworth. ISBN 0-7156-1715-X.
- The Bible. Trans. Peter Levi (1985). The Holy Gospel of John. Worthing: Churchman. ISBN 1-85093-027-9.
- de Courcel, Martine. Trans. Peter Levi (1988). Tolstoy: the ultimate reconciliation. New York: C. Scribner's Sons. ISBN 0-684-18569-5.
- The Bible. Trans. Peter Levi (1992). The Revelation of John. London: Kyle Cathie. ISBN 1-85626-052-6.
- Papadiamantis, Alexandros. Trans. Peter Levi (1995). The murderess. London: Loizou. ISBN 0-9521246-0-2.

=== Religious ===
- The Bible. Compiled. Peter Levi (1974). The English Bible, 1534–1859. London: Constable. ISBN 0-09-459600-X.
- Levi, Peter ed. (1984). The Penguin Book of English Christian Verse. Harmondsworth: Penguin. ISBN Link0140422927.
- Levi, Peter (1987). The Frontiers of Paradise: a study of monks and monasteries. London: Collins Harvill. ISBN 0-00-272513-4.
- Bernard, Bruce and Lloyd, Christopher (1987). The Queen Of Heaven – A Selection of Paintings of the Virgin Mary. London: Macdonald Orbis. (Introduction by Peter Levi).

=== Articles and lectures ===
- Levi, Peter (1975). John Clare and Thomas Hardy. University of London: The Athlone Press. ISBN 0-485-16210-5
- Levi, Peter (1975). In Memory of David Jones: a sermon. In The Tablet.
- O'Connell, Eileen. Trans. Eilís Dillon (1984). The Lamentation of the Dead with "The Lament For Arthur O'Leary". ISBN 0-85646-140-7.
- Levi, Peter (1990). Hopkins a'i Dduw, (Hopkins and his God). North Wales Arts Association. ISSN 0260-6720.
- Levi, Peter (1991). The Art of Poetry: The Oxford Lectures, 1984–1989. New Haven: Yale University Press. ISBN 0-300-04847-5.

=== Novels ===
- Levi, Peter (1979). The Head in the Soup. London: Constable. ISBN 0-09-462850-5.
- Levi, Peter (1985). Grave Witness. London: Quartet. ISBN 0-7043-2497-0.
- Levi, Peter (1986). Knit One, Drop Oone. London: Quartet. ISBN 0-7043-2592-6.
- Levi, Peter (1988). To the Goat. Hutchinson. ISBN 0-09-173627-7.
- Connolly, Cyril (1903–1974), concluded by Peter Levi (1990). Shade Those Laurels. London: Bellew. ISBN 0-947792-37-6.
