= Michael Hamburger =

British translator and writer (1924–2007)

Michael Peter Leopold Hamburger OBE (22 March 1924 – 7 June 2007) was a noted German-British translator, poet, critic, memoirist and academic. He was known in particular for his translations of Friedrich Hölderlin, Paul Celan, Gottfried Benn and W. G. Sebald from German, and his work in literary criticism. The publisher Paul Hamlyn (1926–2001) was his younger brother.

== Life and work ==
Michael Hamburger was born in Berlin into a Jewish family that left for the UK in 1933, and settled in London. He was educated at Westminster School and Christ Church, Oxford and served in the British Army from 1943 to 1947 in Italy and Austria. After that he completed his degree, and wrote for a time. In 1951 he married Anne Beresford.

Hamburger took a position at University College London in 1951, and then at the University of Reading in 1955. There followed many further academic positions in the UK and the US. He held temporary appointments in German at Mount Holyoke College (1966–7), the University of Buffalo (1969), Stony Brook University (1970), Wesleyan University (1971), the University of Connecticut (1972), the University of California at San Diego (1973), the University of South Carolina (1973), and Boston University (1975 and 1977). He resettled permanently in England in 1978, the year he became a part-time professor at the University of Essex.

Hamburger published translations of many of the most important German-language writers, particularly poets. His work was recognised with numerous awards, including the Aristeion Prize in 1990, and he was appointed an Officer of the Order of the British Empire (OBE) in 1992. Hamburger lived in Middleton, Suffolk, and appeared as a character in W. G. Sebald's The Rings of Saturn. A few months before his death he was visited by the artist Tacita Dean, whose poignant film Michael Hamburger focuses on the man and his home and the bonding of the man and his apple orchard. In the same year, German filmmaker Frank Wierke released the documentary Michael Hamburger – Ein englischer Dichter aus Deutschland (An English Poet from Germany), a 72-minute portrait shot single-handedly, without a crew and without interviews, during Hamburger's final years at his home in Middleton. The film won the ARTE Documentary Film Award for the best German documentary of 2007 at the Duisburg Film Week, as well as the Prize for the Culture of History at the blicke film festival of the Ruhr; Hamburger died shortly after attending its London premiere.

Representative works included The Truth of Poetry (1968), a major work of criticism. His Collected Poems, 1941–1994 (1995) drew on around twenty collections. Hamburger himself commented unhappily on the habit that reviewers have of greeting publication of his own poetry with a ritualised "Michael Hamburger, better known as a translator...". Perhaps ironically, his original poetry is better known in its German translations, by the Austrian poet and translator Peter Waterhouse. He often commented on the literary life: the first edition of his autobiography came out with the title A Mug's Game, a quotation from T. S. Eliot, whom Hamburger greatly admired, and to whose sixtieth-birthday biblio-symposium he contributed an eponymous poem of four stanzas which tells its own story.

Michael Hamburger was honoured with the Johann-Heinrich-Voß-Preis für Übersetzung in 1964 and with the Petrarca-Preis in 1992. He died on 7 June 2007 at his home in Suffolk.

== Selected bibliography ==
=== Translations ===
New Poems Günter Grass (translator) English translation Harcourt, Brace,& World, Inc. Copyright 1968

- Charles Baudelaire, Twenty Prose Poems (translator), London, Poetry London, 1946 (revised ed. San Francisco, City Light Books 1988)
- Flowering Cactus: poems 1942–1949, Aldington, Hand and Flower Press, 1950 – out of print
- Poems of Hölderlin (translator), Poetry London 1943, (revised ed. as Holderlin: His Poems, Harvill Press, 1952) – out of print
- Ludwig van Beethoven, Letters, Journals and Conversations. London, Thames & Hudson, 1951 – out of print.
- Trakl, Decline (translator), St. Ives, Guido Morris/Latin Press, 1952 – out of print
- A. Goes, The Burnt Offering (translator), London, Gollancz, 1956 – out of print
- Bertolt Brecht, Tales from the Calendar (translator), London, Methuen, 1961 (reissued London, Lion & Unicorn Press 1980) – out of print
- Hugo von Hofmannsthal, Poems and Verse Plays (translator with others), Routledge & K. Paul, and New York, Bollingen Foundation, 1961 – out of print
- Modern German Poetry 1910–1960 (translator with C Middleton), Routledge, and New York, McGibbon & Kee, 1962 – out of print
- J C F Hölderlin, Selected Verse (translator), Harmondsworth, Middlesex, Penguin, 1961 (latest ed. London, Anvil, 1986)
- Nelly Sachs, Selected Poems (translator), Jonathan Cape and New York, Farrar Straus and Giroux, 1968 – out of print
- Hans Magnus Enzensberger, The Poems of Hans Magnus Enzensberger (translator with J Rothenberg and the author), London, Secker & Warburg, 1968 – out of print
- H M Enzensberger, Poems for People Who Don't Read Poems (translator), Secker & Warburg, 1968 – out of print
- An Unofficial Rilke (translator), London, Anvil Press, 1981 – out of print
- Paul Celan, Poems (translator), Manchester, Carcanet, 1972 (new enlarged ed. as Poems of Paul Celan, New York, Persea, 1988 and 2002, and Anvil Press, 2007)
- Friedrich Hölderlin, Selected poems and Fragments (translator), Penguin Classics, 1998 (new ed. 2007)
- W. G. Sebald, After Nature (translator), London, Hamish Hamilton, 2002
- W. G. Sebald, Unrecounted (translator), Hamish Hamilton, 2004

=== Prose ===
- Reason and Energy, London, Routledge & K. Paul, 1957 – out of print
- From Prophecy to Exorcism: the Premisses of Modern German Literature, Longmans, 1965 – out of print
- The Truth of Poetry, London, Weidenfeld & Nicolson, First published in 1969, (latest ed. Anvil, 1996)
- Testimonies, Selected Shorter Prose 1950–1987, New York, St Martin's Press, 1989
- A Mug's Game (memoir), Carcanet, 1973, (revised ed. as String of Beginnings) – out of print
- String of Beginnings (memoir), Skoob Seriph, 1991
- Philip Larkin: A Retrospect, London, Enitharmon Press, 2002 — edition limited to 90 copies plus 20 hors commerce

=== Poetry ===
- Flowering Cactus. Poems 1942–1949. Hand & Flower Press, Aldington 1950
- Poems 1950–1951. Hand & Flower Press, Aldington 1952
- The Dual Site. Poems. Routledge & Kegan Paul; London 1958
- Weather and Season. New Poems. Longmans, London 1963; Atheneum, New York 1963
- Feeding the Chickadees. Turret Books, London 1968
- Penguin Modern Poets. No. 14. Penguin Books, Harmondsworth 1969 (with Alan Brownjohn and Charles Tomlinson)
- Travelling. Fulcrum Press, London 1969, ISBN 0-85246-044-9
- Travelling I–V. Agenda Editions, London 1973, ISBN 0-902400-09-6
- Ownerless Earth. New & Selected poems. Carcanet Press, Cheadle, Cheshire 1973, ISBN 0-85635-038-9, ISBN 0-85635-039-7
- Travelling VI. I.M. Imprimit, London 1975
- Real Estate. Carcanet, Manchester 1977, ISBN 0-85635-216-0, ISBN 0-85635-234-9
- Moralities. Morden Tower Publications, Newcastle-upon-Tyne 1977, ISBN 0-905760-03-4
- Variations in Suffolk, IV. Sceptre Press, Knotting 1980
- Variations. Carcanet New Press, Manchester 1981, ISBN 0-85635-354-X
- In Suffolk. Five Seasons Press, Hereford 1982
- Collected Poems. 1941–1983. Carcanet Press, Manchester 1984, ISBN 0-85635-497-X
- Trees. Embers Handpress, Llangynog 1988, ISBN 1-871570-01-8
- Selected Poems. Carcanet, Manchester 1988, ISBN 0-85635-752-9
- Roots in the Air. Anvil Press Poetry, London 1991, ISBN 0-85646-243-8
- Collected Poems. 1941–1994. Anvil Press Poetry, London 1995, ISBN 0-85646-266-7
- Late. Anvil Press Poetry, London 1997, ISBN 0-85646-294-2
- Intersections. Shorter Poems 1994–2000. Anvil Press Poetry, London 2000, ISBN 0-85646-321-3
- From a Diary of Non-Events. Anvil Press Poetry, London 2002, ISBN 0-85646-343-4
- Wild and Wounded. Shorter Poems 2000–2003. Anvil Press Poetry, London 2004, ISBN 0-85646-371-X
- Circling the Square. Anvil Press Poetry, London 2006, ISBN 0-85646-392-2

=== Other ===
- Hamburger, Michael. "T. S. Eliot." In T. S. Eliot: A Symposium, edited by Richard March and Tambimuttu, 178. London: Editions Poetry, 1948.
