= Numbers (magazine) =

- Editor: John Alexander, Alison Rimmer, Peter Robinson, Clive Wilmer
- Categories: Literary magazine
- Frequency: Biannual
- Publisher: Numbers Publishing
- Founded: 1986
- Final issue: 1990
- Country: England
- Based in: Cambridge
- ISSN: 0950-2858
- OCLC: 16265848

Numbers was a literary magazine published twice a year in Cambridge, England, between 1986 and 1990. Six issues of the magazine appeared, of which the last was a double issue to celebrate the ninetieth birthday of the American poet and novelist Janet Lewis. Issue 4 was a celebration of the Portuguese poet Fernando Pessoa.

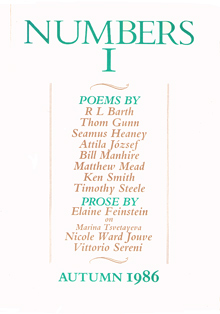
Numbers magazine, cover of issue 1.

Each issue contained an editorial, poems, translations and prose by poets.

Numbers was founded and edited by John Alexander, Alison Rimmer, Peter Robinson and Clive Wilmer.

The magazine emerged from the editors' involvement with the 1977 to 1985 Cambridge Poetry Festivals, and with the exhibition Pound's Artists at Kettle's Yard and the Tate Gallery.

== Contributors ==
Notable contributors to the magazine included:

- John Ash
- John Ashbery
- Yves Bonnefoy
- Edgar Bowers
- Alison Brackenbury
- Donald Davie
- Douglas Dunn
- Lauris Edmond
- U. A. Fanthorpe
- Elaine Feinstein
- Roy Fisher
- Franco Fortini
- Adèle Geras
- György Gömöri
- Thom Gunn
- Rachel Hadas
- Seamus Heaney
- Attila József
- August Kleinzahler
- Janet Lewis
- Grevel Lindop
- Michael Longley
- Bill Manhire
- E. A. Markham
- Medbh McGuckian
- Jamie McKendrick
- Matthew Mead
- Sophia de Mello Breyner Andresen
- Christopher Middleton
- Nicholas Moore
- Ruth Padel
- György Petri
- Peter Riley
- Stephen Romer
- E. J. Scovell
- Vittorio Sereni
- Vikram Seth
- Ken Smith
- Elizabeth Smither
- Timothy Steele
- Grete Tartler
- Charles Tomlinson
- John Tranter
- Gael Turnbull
- Michael Vince
- Marguerite Yourcenar
