= Michael Vince =

British poet and author (born 1947)

Michael Vince (born 1947) is a British poet and author. He was educated at Emanuel School and King's College, Cambridge, where he read English under Tony Tanner and began friendships with the poets Dick Davis, Robert Wells and Clive Wilmer. He taught in Italy and the UK before emigrating to Greece in 1977, where he worked in language teaching with the British Council, and as a free-lance materials writer and in teacher education. He now lives in London.

Vince won a Gregory Award in 1977. He has since published a number of books and pamphlets, most recently Plain Text in 2015, Long Distance in 2020 and Back to Life in 2023. He has appeared in numerous magazines in the UK and USA, including Outposts, Southern Review, PN Review, Encounter, Times Literary Supplement, London Review of Books, Numbers, La Fontana and Verse.

Vince has also published a number of best-selling ELT course books and grammars, including Highlight, and the Language Practice series.

== Works ==
=== Poetry ===
- The Orchard Well (Carcanet, 1978)
- Mountain, Epic and Dream (Bran's Head, 1981)
- In the New District (Carcanet, 1982)
- Gaining Definition (Robert L Barth, 1986)
- Plain Text (Mica, 2015)
- Twelve Poems of Michael Vince (www.michaelvince.co.uk, 2016)
- Long Distance (Mica, 2020)
- A Conversation with George Seferis (Rack, 2022)
- Back to Life [Mica, 2023)

=== Anthology contributions ===
- Young Winter’s Tales (Macmillan)
- The River’s Voice (Common Ground)
- Trees Be Company (Common Ground)
- A Calendar of Modern Poetry (PN Review, 1991)
- Baudelaire in English (Penguin, 1998)
- Hollow Palaces (Liverpool University Press 2021)
