= Anagnostakis =

Anagnostakis is a Greek surname. Notable people with the surname include:

- Andreas Anagnostakis (1826–1897), Greek physician and educator
- Loula Anagnostaki (1928–2017), Greek writer
- Manolis Anagnostakis (1925–2005), Greek poet and critic
