= Richard Berengarten =

British poet, translator and editor

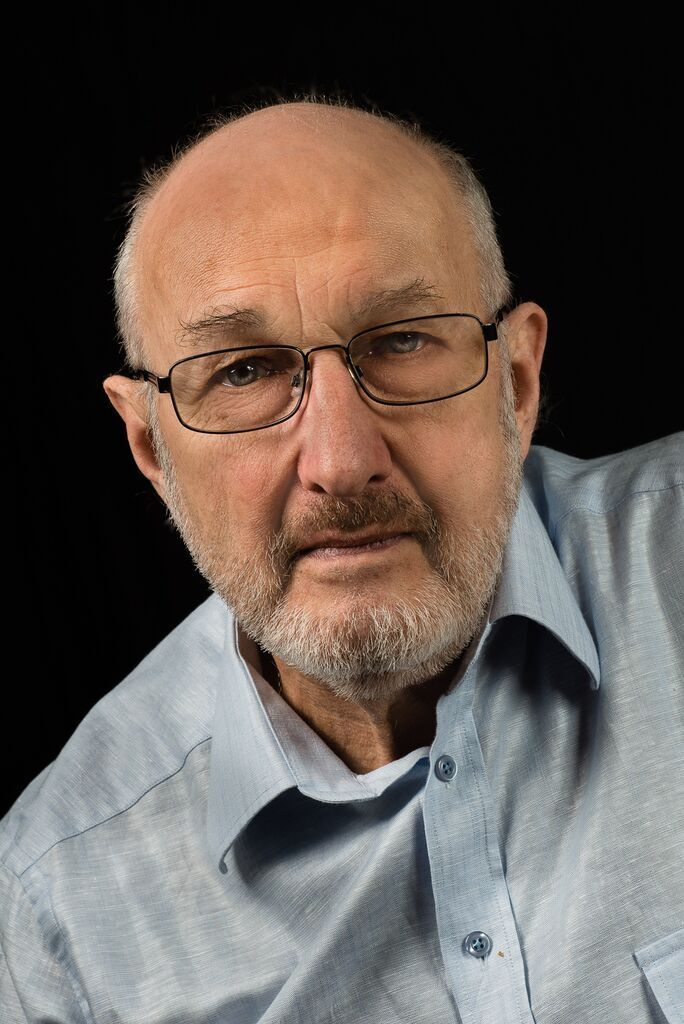
- Born: 4 June 1943 (age 83); London, England
- Education: Pembroke College, Cambridge; University College London
- Occupation: Poet
- Spouse: Melanie Rein
- Relatives: Alexander Berengarten, aka Burns (father), Lara Burns (daughter), Gully Burns (son), Arijana Mišić-Burns (daughter)
- Writing career
- Pen name: Richard Burns; Li Dao (李道)
- Years active: 1961 to present
- Notable works: Changing, Notness, The Blue Butterfly, Under Balkan Light, Black Light, Tree, The Manager
- Notable awards: Eric Gregory Award, Jewish Quarterly-Wingate Prize, Morava Charter Prize, Yeats Club Prize, Keats Memorial Prize, Xu Zhimo Silver Willow Prize, Arts Council Writer’s Award

Richard Berengarten (born 4 June 1943) is an English poet. Having lived in Italy, Greece, the US and the former Yugoslavia, his perspectives as a poet combine English, French, Mediterranean, Jewish, Slavic, American and Oriental influences. His poems explore historical and political material, inner worlds and their archetypal resonances, and relationships and everyday life. His work is marked by its multicultural frames of reference, depth of themes, and variety of forms. In the 1970s, he founded and ran the international Cambridge Poetry Festival. He has been an important presence in contemporary poetry for the past 40 years, and his work has been translated into more than 90 languages.

== Life and work ==
Richard Berengarten (also known as Richard Burns and Li Dao, 李道) was born in London in 1943 of Jewish parents. He was educated at Normansal School (1949–51), Hereward House School (1952–54), Hendon County School (1954–56) and Mill Hill School. He studied English at Pembroke College, Cambridge (1961–64) and Linguistics at University College London (1977–78).

He has lived in Italy, Greece, the UK, the US and the former Yugoslavia, and worked extensively in the Czech Republic, Latvia, Macedonia, Poland, Russia and Slovakia. He has travelled widely throughout West Europe, the Balkans and the USA, and in Japan, India and China.

Richard Berengarten published his first story (under the name of Richard Burns) at the age of 16 in Transatlantic Review. As a student, he wrote for Granta and co-founded the Oxbridge magazine Carcanet. He worked in Padua and Venice, briefly as apprentice to the English poet Peter Russell. In Greece, he witnessed the military coup d'état and in response wrote The Easter Rising 1967. Returning to Cambridge, he met Octavio Paz and, with Anthony Rudolf, co-edited An Octave for Octavio Paz (1972). In the same year, his first poetry collection, Double Flute won an Eric Gregory Award.

His posts include: the British Council, Athens (1967); East London College (1968–69); Cambridgeshire College of Arts and Technology (1969–79); Arts Council resident writer, Victoria Centre for Adult Education (1979–81); Visiting Professor, Notre Dame University (1982); and British Council Lector, Belgrade (1987–91). He is an authority on creative writing for children and adults, and on writing skills for university students. He was Royal Literary Fund Fellow at Newnham College, Cambridge (2003–2005), Project Fellow (2005–2006), and is currently a Preceptor at Corpus Christi College, a Bye-Fellow at Downing College and an Academic Associate at Pembroke College, Cambridge. He also teaches at Peterhouse and Wolfson College, Cambridge, a Fellow of the English Association, and poetry editor of the Jewish Quarterly.

Berengarten has translated poetry, fiction and criticism from Croatian, French, Greek, Italian, Macedonian and Serbian.

His poems and poetry books have been translated into over 85 languages (the poem Volta, presented in issue 9/2009 of The International Literary Quarterly (London) – Richard Burns, Volta: A Multilingual Anthology – into 75. Crna Svetlost (Black Light) was published in Yugoslavia in 1984, Arbol (Tree) in Spain in 1986, and bilingual editions of Tree/Baum (1989) and Black Light/Schwarzes Licht (1996), both translated by Theo Breuer, were published in Germany.

In 2004, Berengarten's first book of selected writings For the Living includes the award-winning poems 'The Rose of Sharon' (Keats Memorial Prize) and 'In Memory of George Seferis I' (Duncan Lawrie Prize).

Berengarten's 'Balkan Trilogy': The Blue Butterfly (2006), In A Time of Drought (2006); and Under Balkan Light (2008) has won international recognition, the first receiving the Wingate Prize, and the second receiving the Morava International Poetry Prize. The Blue Butterfly takes as its starting point, a Nazi massacre on 21 October 1941 in Kragujevac in the former Yugoslavia. Richard Berengarten visited the site and the memorial museum in 1985, when a blue butterfly landed on the forefinger of his writing hand. The resulting work is powerful, examining themes of revenge and forgiveness from the historical context to the present time. He was made an honorary citizen of Kragujevac in 2012, and the title poem is well known in the former Yugoslavia through the translation by Danilo Kiš and Ivan V. Lalic.

Richard Berengarten's work as a poet reflects a range of influences, including British, French, Mediterranean, Jewish, Slavic, American and Asian traditions. He has described himself as a internationalist, and has proposed the term “imaginationalist” in relation to contemporary poetic practice. His poetry has been said to create “cross-cultural dialogue “and to belong to “world literature.”

== Works ==
=== Poetry ===
Some of the earlier poems are collected in larger volumes such as For the Living.

- 1968: The Easter Rising 1967, Restif Press
- 1971: The Return of Lazarus: Poems for Friends in Greece, Bragora Press
- 1972: Avebury, Anvil Press
- 1972: Double Flute, Enitharmon Press
- 1974: Erik Satie Memorial Poem- Realizing/Real I Sing, with John Furnival, Satie's Faction
- 1975: Mandelstam, Los Poetry Press
- 1976: Inhabitable Space, John Morann
- 1977: Angels, Los Poetry Press
- 1977: Some Poems, Enitharmon Press
- 1978: Earthquake, Sceptre Press
- 1980: Learning to Talk, Enitharmon Press
- 1980: Tree, Menard Press
- 1982: Roots/Routes, Cleveland State University Poetry Center
- 1983: The Rose of Sharon, Los Poetry Press
- 1983: Black Light, Los Poetry Press
- 1998: Half of Nowhere, Cambridge University Press
- 1999: Croft Woods, Los Poetry Press
- 1999: Against Perfection, King of Hearts Publications
- 2001: The Manager, Elliott & Thompson
- 2003: Book With No Back Cover, David Paul Press
- 2004: For the Living, (a collection of poems written between 1965 and 2000) Salt Publishing, reprinted by Shearsman Books
- 2006: The Blue Butterfly (Balkan Trilogy I) Shearsman Books
- 2006: Manual: The First 20, Earl of Seacliff Art Workshop
- 2006: In a Time of Drought (Balkan Trilogy II), Shearsman Books
- 2007: Manual: The Second 20: Holding the Darkness, Earl of Seacliff Art Workshop
- 2008: Under Balkan Light (Balkan Trilogy III), Shearsman Books
- 2008: Manual: The Third 20, Earl of Seacliff Art Workshop
- 2009: Manual: The Fourth 20, Earl of Seacliff Art Workshop
- 2012: Like Dew Upon the Morning, six poems, Spokes Magazine 9
- 2014: Poems From 'Changing', Fortnightly Review
- 2014: Manual (selected writings VI, 2009, 2014), Shearsman Books
- 2015: Changing, Shearsman Books
- 2015: Notness: Metaphysical Sonnets, Shearsman Books
- 2022: The Wine Cup: Twenty-four Villanelles for Tao Yuanming, Shearsman Books
- 2022: Dyad (with Will Hill), knives forks and spoons press

=== Prose ===
- 1981: Ceri Richards and Dylan Thomas – Keys To Transformation, Enitharmon Press
- 1985: Anthony Rudolf & The Menard Press, Los Poetry Press
- 1989: Anthony Dorrell: A Memoir
- 1996: With Peter Russell In Venice
- 2009: Border/Lines: an Introduction
- 2010: The dialectics of oxygen: Twelve Propositions
- 2011: A Nimble Footing on the Coals: Tin Ujevic, Lyricist:Some English Perspectives
- 2015: Octavio Paz in Cambridge, 1970
- 2015: On Poetry and Sound: The Ontogenesis of Poetry
- 2015: On Writing and Inner Speech

=== Editor ===
- 1972: An Octave for Octavio Paz, Sceptre Press
- 1980: Ceri Richards: Drawings to Poems by Dylan Thomas
- 1980: Rivers of Life
- 1981: Homage to Mandelstam, Los Poetry Press
- 1983: Roberto Sanesi, In Visible Ink: Selected Poems
- 1983: Roberto Sanesi, In Visible Ink: Selected Poems
- 2008: For Angus – Poems, Prose, Sketches and Music with Gideon Calder
- 2009: Volta: A Multilingual Anthology
- 2010: Nasos Vayenas – The Perfect Order: Selected Poems 1974–2010 . Edited by Paschalis Nikolaou, Richard Berengarten

=== Translations ===
- 1968: Aldo Vianello, Time of a Flower, Anvil Press
- 1969: A. Samarakis, The Flaw (tr. with Peter Mansfield), Hutchinson
- 1973: Roberto Sanesi, The Graphic Works of Ceri Richards, Cerastico Editore
- 1977: Roberto Sanesi, On the Art of Henry Moore, Altrouno/La Nuova Foglio
- 1978: Nasos Vayenas, Biography, Cambridge Lobby Press
- 1996: I Wear My Shadow Inside Me: Poems by Duska Vrhovac, Forest Books
- 1996: Lady in An Empty Dress: poems by Aleksandar Petrov, Forest Books
- 2010: Edited by George Szirtes – New Order: Hungarian Poets of the Post 1989 Generation, Arc Publications
- 2013: Tin Ujević – Twelve Poems, Shearsman Books
- 2015: Paschalis Nikalaou – 12 Greek Poems After Cavafy, Shearsman Books

=== Critical writing ===
- War, Shadows, Mirrors: Castings from The Culture of Lies by Dubravka Ugrešić, an essay by Richard Berengarten in Paideuma, vol. 47, 2022, p. 53–99

=== Works about Richard Berengarten ===
- Simon Jenner on Richard Berengarten (2013)
- Norman Jope, Paul Scott Derrick & Catherine E. Byfield: The Companion to Richard Berengarten (2016)

== Awards ==
- Eric Gregory Award (1972)
- Keats Memorial Prize for Poetry (1972)
- Art Council Writer' Award (1973)
- Keats Memorial Poetry Prize (1974)
- Duncan Lawrie Prize, Arvon International Poetry Competition (1982)
- Yeats Club Prize for poem and translation (1989)
- Yeats Club Prize for translation (1990)
- International Morava Poetry Prize (2005)
- Jewish Quarterly-Wingate Literary Prize for Poetry (1992)
- International Morava Poetry Prize (2005)
- Veliki školski čas award (Serbia) (2007)
- Manada Prize (Macedonia) (2011)
