= Peter Robinson (poet) =

British poet (born 1953)

Peter Robinson in Milan

Peter Robinson (born 18 February 1953, full name: Peter John Edgley Robinson) is a British poet born in Salford, Lancashire.

== Life and career ==
Born Salford, Lancashire, the son of an Anglican curate and geography teacher, Peter Robinson grew up, with the exception of five years spent in Wigan (1962-1967), in poor urban parishes of north and south Liverpool. He graduated from the University of York in 1974. In the 1970s he edited the poetry magazine Perfect Bound and helped organise several international Cambridge Poetry Festivals between 1977 and 1985, acting as festival coordinator in 1979. He was awarded a doctorate from the University of Cambridge in 1981 for a thesis on the poetry of Donald Davie, Roy Fisher and Charles Tomlinson. Among the most decisive events for his creative life, a sexual assault in Italy upon his girlfriend in 1975 — which he witnessed at gunpoint — formed the material for some of the poems in This Other Life (1988) and provided the plot outline for September in the Rain, a novel published in September 2016.

During the 1980s he was one of the organisers of the exhibition Pound's Artists: Ezra Pound and the Visual Arts in London, Paris and Italy at Kettle's Yard and the Tate Gallery, co-edited the magazine Numbers and was advisor to the 1988 Poetry International at the South Bank Centre, London. After teaching for the University of Wales, Aberystwyth, and at the University of Cambridge, he held various posts in Japan including teaching English Literature and English as a second language at Tohoku University in Sendai from 1991 to 2005. He underwent a successful brain tumor operation in 1993. He married Ornella Trevisan in 1995 and they have two daughters. In 2007 he returned to the UK to take up a post as Professor of English and American literature at the University of Reading. There he founded Creative Writing at Reading and collaborated in its development into a full joint degree program with English Literature and a number of other arts subjects, to which an MA degree was added for the 2022-23 academic year. Robinson organised a centenary conference on the work of the poet Bernard Spencer (1909–1963) which resulted in his editing a new collected edition in 2011, and helped found the Reading Poetry Festival (2013–17). He is poetry editor for Two Rivers Press, a poetry editor of The Fortnightly Review and literary executor for the estates of the poets Roy Fisher (1930–2017) and Mairi MacInnes (1925–2017).

== Critical reception ==
Peter Robinson's earliest published poetry received numerous notices, including one in which the poet and novelist James Lasdun observed that ‘he is a poet, and one with a sensibility which, if attuned only to a somewhat limited range of experience, is unusually refined’ in Siting Fires 1 (1983). Eric Griffiths’ in PN Review 35 (1983), described Robinson as ‘in my judgement, the finest poet of his generation’. On the publication of This Other Life (1988) Martin Dodsworth in the Guardian (Friday 13 May 1988) described the book as ‘grave and deliberated…beautiful and mysterious too’. Rachel Billington singled it out in the Financial Times (20 Feb 1988), and it was named a ‘Book of the Year’ in the Sunday Telegraph (4 Dec 1988). Stephen Romer described it as ‘love poetry of an exemplary kind’ in the Times Literary Supplement (19 Aug 1988) and John Kerrigan found in it ‘a miracle of balance’ in the London Review of Books (13 Oct 1988). Four years later, Nicholas Tredell observed, of his first poems written from Japan, that 'he thus joins a line of expatriate poets which includes Empson and Enright. The challenges for such a poet are threefold: how to negotiate with cultural difference – an especially complex problem today, when Eurocentrism has been strongly challenged; how to relate to the world he has left; and how to distinguish himself from his poetic predecessors. Robinson meets these challenges with tact and skill.'

John Ashbery characterised his poetry as ‘curiously strong’ in PN Review (1993), while Peter Swaab, again in the TLS (4 Sept 1998) noted its ‘staying power’. James Keery articulated underlying themes in ‘Marred in a way you recognize’ in PN Review 126 (Mar-April 1999). The first appreciation in a critical study came with Sumie Okada's ‘A Sense of Being Misplaced’, Western Writers in Japan (Basingstoke: Macmillan, 1999). Robinson's work continued to receive attention, and the publication of his Selected Poems (2003) prompted a number of reviews including a welcome by Patrick McGuinness in the Poetry Review (Winter 2005), a review in The Japan Times (20 Oct 2003) by David Burleigh, and one in Romanian by Catalin Ghita.

His critical standing was underlined by The Salt Companion to Peter Robinson, a collection of fourteen essays with a bibliography (1976–2006), edited by Adam Piette and Katy Price. The volume includes a preface by Roy Fisher in which he observes: ‘Thus the life-events don’t provide the driving force of the poems; rather they make up the terrain, a varied surface across which the poet travels, living his life but always exercising a strong disposition to make poems from somewhere close to everyday events. It’s as if he carries a listening device, alert for the moments when the tectonic plates of mental experience slide quietly one beneath another to create paradoxes and complexities that call for poems to be made. These are not the ordinary urgencies of autobiography, but they are the urgencies of new creations’ (p. 22).

Responses to The Look of Goodbye include Ben Hickman's in Jacket, and Tom Phillips’ in Eyewear, while Ian Brinton features his observations on the art in Contemporary Poetry: Poets and Poetry since 1990 (Cambridge: Cambridge University Press, 2009). A review of The Returning Sky (a Poetry Book Society Recommendation for the Spring quarter) in the Autumn 2012 issue of Poetry Review (102/3)described Robinson as 'a major English poet', and Peter Riley noticed that his 'poems exploit a paradox: the sense of meticulously careful writing which places the poet in complete control, reinforced by his access to formalities of metre and rhyme when he needs them, work to undermine his self-security, his sense of standing firmly on the ground.' His Collected Poems 1976-2016 appeared in February 2017 and was noticed in a number of reviews including those by Ian Pople in The Manchester Review and Will May in Journal of Poetics Research. More recently, his support for the remain side in the 2016 EU Referendum found poetic voice in Ravishing Europa, and friendship with the painter David Inshaw in Bonjour Mr Inshaw. Individual poems by Peter Robinson have been translated into Brazilian Portuguese, Bulgarian, Chinese, Dutch, French, German, Greek, Italian, Japanese, Macedonian, Romanian, and Spanish.

Robinson's other writings have also received critical attention. The translations of Vittorio Sereni, made in collaboration with Marcus Perryman, were described by Charles Tomlinson in The Independent (1990) as 'versions that possess an uncanny accuracy, true to the fragmented, self-communing, smoldering and combustible humanity of Sereni's work'. Choosing The Great Friend and Other Translated Poems (2002) as a Poetry Book Society Recommended Translation, Douglas Dunn wrote that 'the range is eclectic without being scattered confusingly across too many languages and cultures. For me at least, much of this work is new' while Glyn Pursglove, reviewing the book in Acumen, found that Robinson's 'attempted fidelity is not allowed to distort his own use of English and English verse and there is a great deal to admire and enjoy here. Indeed, one could wish the book a good deal longer.' John Welle recommended the translations of Luciano Erba (2007) in a jacket comment as 'marvelously attuned … accurate, carefully crafted, and in harmony with the idiom and spirit of the originals.' They were awarded the 2008 John Florio Prize.

Donald Davie reviewed In the Circumstances: About Poems and Poets (1992) in the London Review of Books noting that 'Robinson deserves every credit for forcing his way into the thickets.' Poetry, Poets, Readers: Making Things Happen (2002) was found by Andrea Brady in Poetry Review to show 'The conviction, pleasures and gratitude of committed reading are evident in this affirmation of the poetic contract between readers and writers. 'Angela Leighton wrote for the Times Literary Supplement of Twentieth Century Poetry: Selves and Situations (2005) that 'Robinson has been a generous promoter of contemporary poetry for decades, and this collection of essays bears witness to his dedication and energy. He writes with an unformulaic enthusiasm, moving easily from biographical, political and poetic context to the nitty-gritty of close reading, while also striking an easy, readable tone'. Five years later, in the same journal, Justin Quinn found that Poetry & Translation: The Art of the Impossible (2010) was 'Vigorously and wittily argued … an excellent and provocative contribution to a complex debate.' Reviewing Poetry & Money: A Speculation in Essays in Criticism, Adrian Grafe wrote that 'One comes away from Poetry & Money not only stimulated (and sometimes taxed), but above all glad and grateful to have encountered such unfailing enthusiasm for, and commitment to, the art of poetry.'

Robinson has published a selection of aphorisms called Spirits of the Stair in 2009, Foreigners, Drunks and Babies: Eleven Stories in 2013, a collection of prose poetry and memoirs entitled The Draft Will (2015) and a novel, September in the Rain in 2016. His fiction has been noticed, with David Cooke writing in The London Magazine that the collection of short stories is 'an impressive body of work that deserves to gain a wider readership', while Paula Byrne wrote that 'September in the Rain is a novel of extraordinary beauty and courage', Jonathan Coe found in it 'a kind of redemption thanks to the tone or rueful, quizzical honesty', and Giles Foden saw it as 'a triumph of style, its sentences being assayed with a poet's feeling for the weight of each word.' Ian Brinton described it on his Tears in the Fence blog for 29 August 2016 as 'a stunningly moving novel'. Peter Robinson: A Portrait of his Work appeared in October 2021 edited by Tom Phillips and with chapters on many aspects of his writings by Ian Brinton, Peter Carpenter, Tony Crowley, Martin Dodsworth, Andrew Houwen, Miki Iwata, James Peake, Piers Pennington, Adam Piette, Elaine Randell, Anna Saroldi, Matthew Sperling and Alison Stone, with an up-to-date Bibliography by Derek Slade.

== Archives ==
A small portion of Peter Robinson's literary manuscripts, typescripts, corrected proofs, autograph correspondence, signed editions, and sound recordings are held by the British Library, the John Rylands Library at the University of Manchester, the Brotherton Library at the University of Leeds, the Centro Manoscritti at the University of Pavia, the University of Sheffield Library, Hull History Centre, the Beinecke Library at Yale University, the Thomas J. Dodd Research Center, University of Connecticut Libraries, and the Alexander Turnbull Library, Wellington, New Zealand. In September 2021 a first tranche of Robinson's archive, composed of publications, correspondence, notebooks, manuscripts, typescripts, proofs and related papers was deposited at the University of Reading's Special Collections. A symposium to explore the acquisition, organised by Steven Matthews, was held on 9-10 July 2023.

== Primary bibliography ==
(organized under the following sub-headings)

=== Poetry ===
- The Benefit Forms (Lobby Press: 1978)
- Going Out to Vote (Many Press: 1978)
- Overdrawn Account (Many Press: 1980) ISBN 0-9504916-9-1
- Anaglypta (Many Press: 1985) ISBN 0-907326-11-0
- This Other Life (Carcanet: 1988) Winner of the Cheltenham Prize ISBN 0-85635-737-5
- More about the Weather (Robert Jones: 1989) ISBN 978-0-9514240-0-1 (hardback) ISBN 0-9514240-1-7 (paperback)
- Entertaining Fates (Carcanet: 1992) ISBN 0-85635-975-0
- Leaf-Viewing (Robert Jones: 1992) ISBN 0-9514240-2-5
- Lost and Found (Carcanet: 1997) ISBN 1-85754-176-6
- Via Sauro Variations (Ridgeback: 1999)
- Anywhere You Like (Pine Wave: 2000)
- About Time Too (Carcanet: 2001) ISBN 1-85754-510-9
- Selected Poems 1976-2001 (Carcanet: 2003) ISBN 1-85754-625-3
- Ghost Characters (Shoestring: 2006) ISBN 1-904886-25-6
- There are Avenues (Brodie: 2006) ISBN 0-9542649-5-9
- The Look of Goodbye: Poems 2001-2006 (Shearsman Books: 2008) ISBN 978-1-905700-45-5
- Ekphrastic Marriage (Pine Wave Press: 2009) with artworks by Andrew McDonald
- English Nettles and Other Poems (Two Rivers Press: 2010) illustrated by Sally Castle ISBN 978-1-901677-65-2 (hardback)and second, revised edition (Two Rivers Press: 2022) ISBN 978-1-901677-65-2 (paperback)
- The Returning Sky (Shearsman Books: 2012) Poetry Book Society Recommendation ISBN 978-1-84861-186-3
- Like the Living End (Worple Press: 2013) ISBN 978-1-915048-02-8
- Buried Music (Shearsman Books: 2015) ISBN 978-1-84861-389-8
- An Epithalamium (Pine Wave Press: 2016)
- Collected Poems 1976-2016 (Shearsman Books: 2017) ISBN 978-1-84861-524-3
- Ravishing Europa (Worple Press: 2019) ISBN 978-1-905208-43-2
- Bonjour Mr Inshaw: Poems by Peter Robinson, Paintings by David Inshaw (Two Rivers Press: 2020) ISBN 978-1-909747-56-2
- Retrieved Attachments (Two Rivers Press: 2023) ISBN 978-1-915048-059
- Ligurian Diary (Pine Wave Press: 2023)
- Return to Sendai: New & Selected Poems 1973-2024 (MadHat Press: 2025) ISBN 978-1-952335-92-1

=== Poetry in translation ===
- After Chardin: Selected Poems translated by Takao Furukawa (Okayama: 1996)
- L'attaccapanni e altre poesie translated by Peter Robinson and Ornella Trevisan (Moretti e Vitali: 2005) ISBN 978-88-7186-267-5
- Approach to Distance: Selected Poems from Japan translated with an introduction by Miki Iwata (Isobar Press: 2017) ISBN 978-4-907359-18-8
- L'apprendista libraio e altri versi parmigiani translated by Pietro De Marchi, the author and Ornella Trevisan (Silva Editore: 2023) ISBN 978-88-7765-238-6
- Enignmi e dintorni translated by Pietro De Marchi, the author and Ornella Trevisan (Stampa2009: 2024) ISBN 978-88-8336-080-0

=== Prose ===
- Untitled Deeds (Salt Publishing: 2004) ISBN 1-84471-044-0
- Spirits of the Stair: Selected Aphorisms (Shearsman Books: 2009) ISBN 978-1-84861-062-0
- Foreigners, Drunks and Babies: Eleven Stories (Two Rivers Press: 2013) ISBN 978-1-901677-93-5
- The Draft Will (Isobar Press: 2015) ISBN 978-4-907359-11-9
- September in the Rain: A Novel (Holland House Books: 2016) ISBN 978-1-910688-10-6
- The Constitutionals: A Fiction (Two Rivers Press: 2019) ISBN 978-1-909747-48-7

=== Translations ===
- Six Poems by Ungaretti (Plain Wrapper: 1981) with Marcus Perryman
- The Disease of the Elm and Other Poems by Vittorio Sereni (The Many Press: 1981) with Marcus Perryman ISBN 0-907326-08-0
- Selected Poems of Vittorio Sereni (Anvil: 1990) with Marcus Perryman ISBN 0-85646-204-7
- When I was at my most beautiful and other poems by Noriko Ibaragi (Skate: 1992) with Fumiko Horikawa ISBN 0-9515145-2-0
- The Great Friend and Other Translated Poems (Worple: 2002) Poetry Book Society Recommendation ISBN 978-0-9539477-4-4
- Selected Poetry and Prose of Vittorio Sereni (Chicago UP: 2006) with Marcus Perryman ISBN 978-0-226-74878-8 (hardback) and (Chicago UP: 2013) ISBN 9780226055541 (paperback)
- The Greener Meadow: Selected Poems of Luciano Erba (Princeton UP: 2007) Winner of the John Florio Prize ISBN 978-0-691-12763-7 (hardback) ISBN 978-0-691-12764-4 (paperback)
- Poems by Antonia Pozzi (One World Classics: 2011) ISBN 978-1-84749-185-5
- Reports after the Fire: Selected Poems of Pietro De Marchi (Shearsman Books: 2022) ISBN 978-1-84861-798-8
- The Collected Poems of Giorgio Bassani (Agincourt Press: 2023) with Roberta Antognini ISBN 978-1-946328-36-6

=== Criticism ===
- In the Circumstances: About Poems and Poets (Oxford University Press: 1992) ISBN 978-0-19-811248-8
- Poetry, Poets, Readers: Making Things Happen (Oxford University Press: 2002) ISBN 978-0-19-925113-1
- Twentieth Century Poetry: Selves and Situations (Oxford University Press: 2005) ISBN 978-0-19-927325-6
- Poetry & Translation: The Art of the Impossible (Liverpool University Press: 2010) ISBN 978-1-84631-218-2 and (Liverpool University Press: 2021) ISBN 978-1-80085-970-8 (paperback)
- The Sound Sense of Poetry (Cambridge University Press: 2018) ISBN 978-1-108-42296-3
- Poetry & Money: A Speculation (Liverpool University Press: 2020) ISBN 978-1-78962-253-9
- The Personal Art: Essays, Reviews & Memoirs (Shearsman Books: 2021) ISBN 978-1-84861-743-8

=== Interviews ===
- Talk about Poetry: Conversations on the Art (Shearsman: 2006) ISBN 978-1-905700-04-2

=== As editor ===
- With All the Views: Collected Poems of Adrian Stokes (Carcanet Press and Black Swan Books: 1981) ISBN 0-85635-334-5
- Geoffrey Hill: Essays on his Work (Open University Press: 1985) ISBN 0-335-10588-2
- Liverpool Accents: Seven Poets and a City (Liverpool University Press: 1996) ISBN 978-0-85323-671-9
- The Thing About Roy Fisher: Critical Studies (Liverpool University Press: 2000) with John Kerrigan ISBN 978-0-85323-525-5
- News for the Ear: A Homage to Roy Fisher (Stride Publications: 2000) with Robert Sheppard ISBN 1-900152-67-3
- Mairi MacInnes: A Tribute (Shoestring Press: 2005) ISBN 978-1-904886-10-5
- An Unofficial Roy Fisher (Shearsman Books: 2010) ISBN 978-1-84861-120-7
- Complete Poetry, Translations & Selected Prose of Bernard Spencer (Bloodaxe Books: 2011) ISBN 1-85224-891-2
- Reading Poetry: An Anthology (Two Rivers Press: 2011) ISBN 978-1-901677-72-0
- A Mutual Friend: Poems for Charles Dickens (Two Rivers Press with the English Association: 2012) ISBN 978-1-901677-78-2
- Bernard Spencer: Essays on his Poetry & Life (Shearsman Books: 2012) ISBN 978-1-848612-54-9
- The Oxford Handbook of Contemporary British and Irish Poetry (Oxford University Press: 2013) ISBN 978-0-19-959680-5 and (Oxford University Press: 2016) ISBN 978-0-19-877854-7 paperback
- The Arts of Peace: An Anthology of Poetry (Two Rivers Press: 2014) with Adrian Blamires ISBN 978-1-909747-04-3
- Roy Fisher, An Easily Bewildered Child: Occasional Prose 1963-2013 (Shearsman Books: 2014) ISBN 978-1-84861-300-3
- Thomas Hardy, Places and Other Poems chosen and with an afterword by Peter Robinson (Two Rivers Press: 2014) ISBN 978-1-909747-06-7
- F. T. Prince, Memoirs of Caravaggio (Perdika Press: 2015) ISBN 978-1-905649-19-8
- The Rilke of Ruth Speirs: New Poems, Duino Elegies, Sonnets to Orpheus, and Others (Two Rivers Press: 2015) with John Pilling ISBN 978-1-909747-12-8
- Henry James Poems: A Keepsake of Samples (The British Library: 2016)
- Roy Fisher, Slakki: New and Neglected Poems (Bloodaxe Books: 2016) ISBN 978-1-78037-322-5
- Roy Fisher, A Furnace (Flood Editions: 2018) ISBN 978-0-9981695-5-2
- Roy Fisher, The Citizen and the Making of City (Bloodaxe Books: 2022) ISBN 978-1-78037-596-0

== Secondary bibliography ==
- The Salt Companion to Peter Robinson edited by Adam Piette and Katy Price (Salt Publishing: 2007) ISBN 978-1-84471-244-1
- 'Peter Robinson at Sixty' edited by Adam Piette, Blackbox Manifold no. 9 (2012): http://www.manifold.group.shef.ac.uk/index.html
- Martin Dodsworth, "Dormiveglia in Peter Robinson's Poetry", English: The Journal of the English Association vol. 67, no. 259 (Winter 2018): https://academic.oup.com/english/article-abstract/67/259/321/5238806
- Peter Robinson: A Portrait of his Work edited by Tom Phillips (Shearsman Books: 2021) ISBN 978-1-84861-744-5
