= Grevel Lindop =

English poet, academic and literary critic (born 1948)

- Born: Grevel Charles Garrett Lindop; 6 October 1948 (age 77); Liverpool, England
- Education: Liverpool College; Wadham College, Oxford
- Occupations: Poet, academic and literary critic

Grevel Charles Garrett Lindop (born 6 October 1948) is an English poet, academic and literary critic.

== Life ==
Lindop was born in Liverpool, England, to solicitor John Neale Lindop, LL.M. and Winifred (née Garrett), and educated at Liverpool College, then Wadham College, Oxford, where he read English, taking an M.A. (B.A. 1970) and Bachelor of Letters. After two years of postgraduate research at Wadham and Wolfson College, Oxford, he moved to Chorlton-cum-Hardy, Manchester, finishing his Ph.D. at the Victoria University of Manchester and becoming a lecturer there in 1971. He became a senior lecturer in 1984, reader in English Literature in 1993, and Professor of Romantic and Early Victorian Studies from 1996 to 2001.

Lindop began writing poetry when at Oxford, working with Michael Schmidt, a fellow undergraduate, to co-edit Carcanet (the magazine, only later a publishing house).

Lindop is a frequent contributor to The Times Literary Supplement, reviewing poetry, biography, fiction, exhibitions and theatre. He also writes essays and reviews for a range of magazines including The London Magazine, Stand, P..N. Review, Poetry London and Temenos Academy Review. As a director of the Temenos Academy from 2000 to 2003, Lindop held the post of editor at Temenos Academy Review. He is also a fellow of the Wordsworth Trust.

He and his wife, Amanda Therese Marian (née Cox), live at Chorlton-cum-Hardy, Manchester. They have a son and two daughters.

== Publications ==
When Carcanet Press began publishing pamphlets Lindop's Against the Sea was among the earliest ones published.

His first full-length collection of poems, Fools' Paradise, was published in 1977. Five other collections have been published since: Tourists (1987), A Prismatic Toy (1991), Selected Poems (2000) and Playing With Fire (2006). Lindop's most recent collection, Lunar Park, was published by Carcanet Press in 2015.

Lindop wrote a biography of Thomas De Quincey which was published in 1981 as The Opium-Eater: a Life of Thomas De Quincey. He also edited De Quincey's Confessions of an English Opium-Eater and Other Writings for the Oxford World's Classics series in 1985, and was General Editor of The Works of Thomas De Quincey, a 21-volume complete edition of his writings, produced by a team of eleven editors and published in 2000–03.

Sigma Press published Lindop's A Literary Guide to the Lake District in 1993 (third edition, 2015: ISBN 978-1910758120). The guide to the area's literary connections won the Lakeland Book of the Year award in 1994.

In 2008, André Deutsch published Travels on the Dance Floor (ISBN 0233002367) (third edition 2010), Lindop's account of his six-week journey to Cuba, Venezuela, Colombia, Panama, Puerto Rico, the Dominican Republic, and Miami in search of the roots of salsa dancing.

Oxford University Press published Charles Williams: The Third Inkling in 2015 (ISBN 978-0199284153).
