= Vagenas =

Vagenas is a surname. Notable people with the surname include:

- Nasos Vagenas (born 1945), Greek poet and writer
- Peter Vagenas (born 1978), American soccer player
