= Bekassy =

Bekassy, Békási, Békásy or Békássy is a Hungarian surname. Notable people with the surname include:

- Ferenc Békássy (1893–1915), Hungarian poet
- Stephen Bekassy (1907–1995), Hungarian-born American actor
