= Clive Wilmer =

British poet and writer (1945–2025)

- Born: 10 February 1945; Harrogate, Yorkshire, England
- Died: 13 March 2025 (aged 80); Cambridge, Cambridgeshire, England
- Education: Emanuel School; King's College, Cambridge
- Occupations: Poet; critic; literary journalist; broadcaster; lecturer
- Organization: Sidney Sussex College
- Partner: Patricia Fara
- Children: 2
- Relatives: Val Wilmer (sister)
- Writing career
- Genre: Poetry

Clive Wilmer (10 February 1945 – 13 March 2025) was a British poet, who published nine volumes of poetry. He was also a critic, literary journalist, broadcaster and lecturer.

== Life and career ==
Clive Wilmer was born on 10 February 1945 in Harrogate, Yorkshire, England. He grew up in South London, where he attended Emanuel School, going on to read English at King's College, Cambridge. He was the brother of writer and photographer Val Wilmer. He had a daughter, a son and two grandsons, and shared his life with the historian of science Patricia Fara.

Wilmer had various teaching jobs in Italy – in Florence, Verona, Padua and Venice. In 2015, he was a visiting professor at Ca' Foscari University of Venice.

He lived latterly in Cambridge, where he was Emeritus Fellow of Sidney Sussex College. He had also been an Honorary Fellow of Anglia Ruskin University, an Anniversary Fellow of Whitelands College, University of Roehampton, and an Honorary Patron of the William Morris Gallery, Walthamstow.

Wilmer died in Cambridge on 13 March 2025, at the age of 80, following a stroke.

== Work ==
Wilmer's poetry is usually formal but occasionally experimental. He saw religion as fundamental to what he wrote, yet he did not associate himself with a parochial view of spiritual matters.

His work is also marked by an enthusiasm for architecture and visual culture. He was an advocate for the work of the Victorian critic, artist, philanthropist and social reformer John Ruskin. Since 1995, Wilmer had been a Companion of the Guild of St George, the charity for arts, crafts and the rural economy, founded by Ruskin. Wilmer was a Director of the Guild from 2004 to 2019 and the Master from 2009 to 2019. He also wrote extensively on William Morris. He was the editor of Penguin Books selections of John Ruskin (Unto This Last, and Other Writings) and William Morris (News from Nowhere, and Other Writings). In 2023, Wilmer received the annual Lifetime Achievement Award of the Ruskin Society of North America.

He was interested in the art of verse translation and has translated from several languages, In particular, he translated in collaboration with the Hungarian poet George Gömöri. Together they published seven books of Hungarian poetry, including Miklós Radnóti, György Petri, János Pilinszky and Gömöri himself, as well as pieces by several others. In recognition of this work, Wilmer was awarded the Endre Ady Memorial Medal by the Hungarian PEN Club in 1998; the Pro Cultura Hungarica medal by the Hungarian Ministry of Culture in 2005; and in Budapest, in 2018, he received the Janus Pannonius Prize for a lifetime's achievement in translation from Hungarian. Wilmer's own poems have been translated into Hungarian, Italian and Spanish.

Wilmer was the prime mover of the Ezra Pound centenary exhibition Pound's Artists: Ezra Pound and the Visual Arts in London, Paris and Italy, held at Kettle's Yard and the Tate Gallery in 1985. From 1986 to 1990, Wilmer was one of the four founding editors of the magazine Numbers.

He contributed poems and articles to a wide range of newspapers and periodicals, including the Times Literary Supplement, PN Review and The London Magazine. He also broadcast for the BBC and from 1989 to 1991 was chief presenter for the series Poet of the Month on BBC Radio 3; most of the interviews made for that programme were transcribed in his book Poets Talking (1994).

His many lectures both in Britain and overseas include: the Mikimoto Memorial Ruskin Lecture at Lancaster University (1996); the William Morris Birthday Lecture for the Friends of the William Morris Gallery, Walthamstow (2014); the Ruskin Art Club’s annual Ruskin Lecture at California State University, Los Angeles (2016); the annual Ruskin Lecture for the Guild of St George (2019); and the first Ruskin Birthday Lecture at Notre Dame University, Indiana (2020). He also organised conferences, symposia and colloquies. These include, at Sidney Sussex College in 2011, a conference for the quatercentenary of the King James Bible, and at the Museo Correr, Venice, in 2018, a symposium on Ruskin and Venice to accompany the exhibition John Ruskin: Le pietri di Venezia at the Ducal Palace there.

Among contemporary writers, Wilmer wrote on the work of the poets Thom Gunn and Donald Davie and has edited volumes of their essays. His annotated edition of Gunn's Selected Poems was published by Faber and Faber in 2017. He co-edited The Letters of Thom Gunn (2021), and also edited The Essays of Thom Gunn. Wilmer had been a personal friend of Gunn.

== Publications ==
- The Dwelling-Place (1977)
- (as translator with George Gömöri) Miklós Radnóti, Forced March: Selected Poems (1979)
- Devotions - poems (1982)
- (as editor) Thom Gunn, The Occasions of Poetry: Essays in Criticism and Autobiography (1982)
- (as editor) John Ruskin, Unto This Last, and Other Writings (1985)
- A Catalogue of Flowers – poetry pamphlet (1986)
- Amores - poetry pamphlet (1986)
- (as editor) Dante Gabriel Rossetti, Selected Poems and Translations (1991)
- (as translator with George Gömöri) György Petri, Night Song of the Personal Shadow: Selected Poems (1991)
- Of Earthly Paradise – poems (1992)
- (as editor) William Morris, News from Nowhere and Other Writings (1993)
- Poets Talking: The 'Poet of the Month' Interviews from BBC Radio 3 (1994)
- Selected Poems (1995)
- (as translator with George Gömöri) George Gömöri, My Manifold City (1996)
- (as editor with Charles Moseley) Cambridge Observed: An Anthology (1998)
- (as editor) Donald Davie, With the Grain: Essays on Thomas Hardy and Modern British Poetry (1998)
- (as editor with George Gömöri) The Life and Poetry of Miklós Radnóti: Essays (1999)
- (as translator with George Gömöri) György Petri, Eternal Monday: New and Selected Poems (1999)
- The Falls – poems (2000)
- (as editor) Dante Gabriel Rossetti, Selected Poems and Translations (2002)
- (as editor with George Gömöri) Miklós Radnóti, Forced March: Selected Poems, revised & expanded edition (2003)
- (as editor) Donald Davie, Modernist Essays: Yeats, Pound, Eliot (2004)
- Stigmata - poetry pamphlet (2005)
- The Mystery of Things – poems (2006)
- (as translator with George Gömöri) György (George) Gömöri, Versek Marinak / Poems for Mari (2006)
- (as translator with George Gömöri) George Gömöri, Polishing October (2008)
- (as translator with George Gömöri) János Pilinszky, Passio: Fourteen Poems (2011)
- New & Collected Poems (2012)
- (as translator with George Gömöri) George Gömöri, Polishing October – revised and expanded edition (2013)
- A New Road on which the World should Travel: John Ruskin, "The Nature of Gothic" and William Morris – lecture (2014)
- Urban Pastorals – poetry pamphlet (2014)
- Ruskin’s Language: How a Victorian Prophet Uses Words – lecture booklet (2016)
- (as editor) Thom Gunn, Selected Poems (2017)
- (as editor and, with George Gömöri, translator) Steep Path: Poems translated from Hungarian (2018)
- What the Guild of St George Does: Reflections on Wealth and Life – lecture (2019)
- (as editor with Michael Nott and August Kleinzahler) The Letters of Thom Gunn (2021)
