= Ferenc Békássy =

Hungarian poet

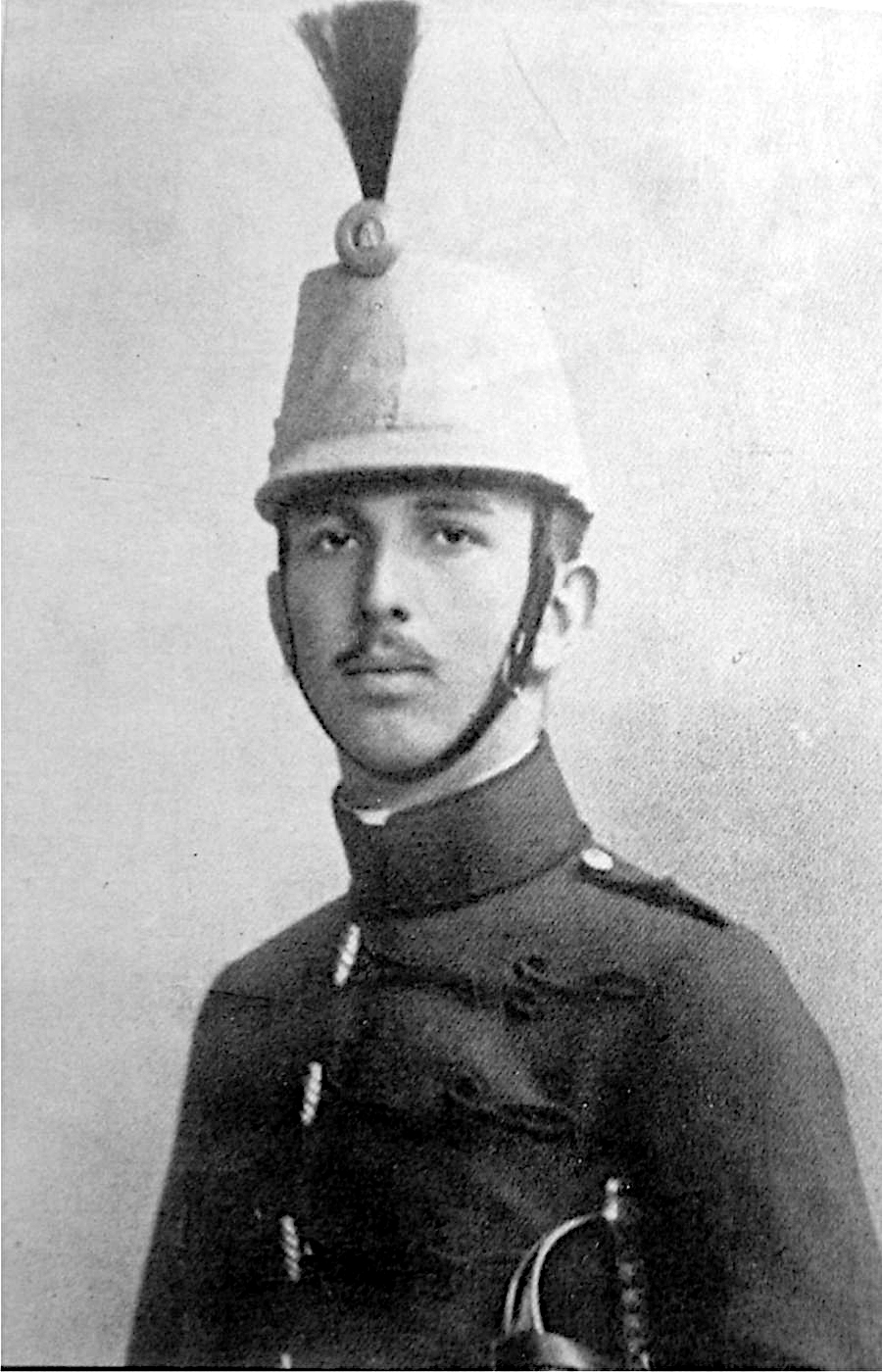
- Békássy in uniform
- Born: 7 April 1893; Zsennye, Austria-Hungary (present-day Hungary)
- Died: 22 June 1915 (aged 22); Bukovina, Austria-Hungary (present-day Ukraine)
- Education: King's College, Cambridge
- Writing career
- Genre: Poetry

Ferenc Istvan Dénes Gyula Békássy (7 April 1893 – 22 June 1915) was a Hungarian poet who was killed in World War I.

== Biography ==
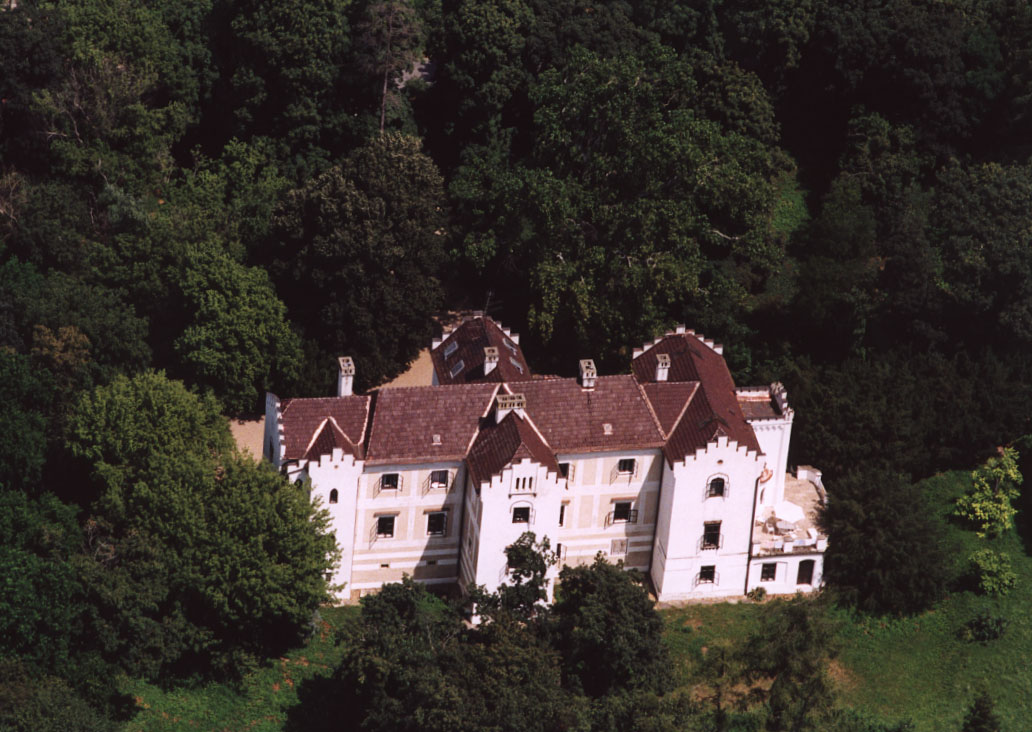
Aerial photograph of family home at Zsennye

Ferenc Istvan Dénes Gyula Békássy was born to Istvan Békássy and Emma Bezeredj in the family mansion at Zsennye in Vas County, western Hungary. He and his five siblings were sent to Bedales School for a progressive English education.

After six years at Bedales, in 1911 he entered King's College, Cambridge as a pensioner to read History. At Cambridge University his friends included James Strachey, E. L. Grant Watson, and especially John Maynard Keynes, who went to stay with him in Hungary during the summer of 1913. He was elected a member of the Cambridge Apostles, the semi-secret debating club. He and Rupert Brooke courted the same woman, Noël Olivier, whom Békássy had known from Bedales.

He wrote poetry in both Hungarian and English. Some of his English poems appeared in a Cambridge anthology in 1913. The Hungarian poems were only published posthumously.

When war was imminent, with the assistance of Keynes, he returned to Austro-Hungary to enlist. He served in a Hussar unit and four days after arriving on the Eastern Front, he was killed in action against the Russians in Bukovina on 22 June 1915. His body was brought back to the family estate for burial.

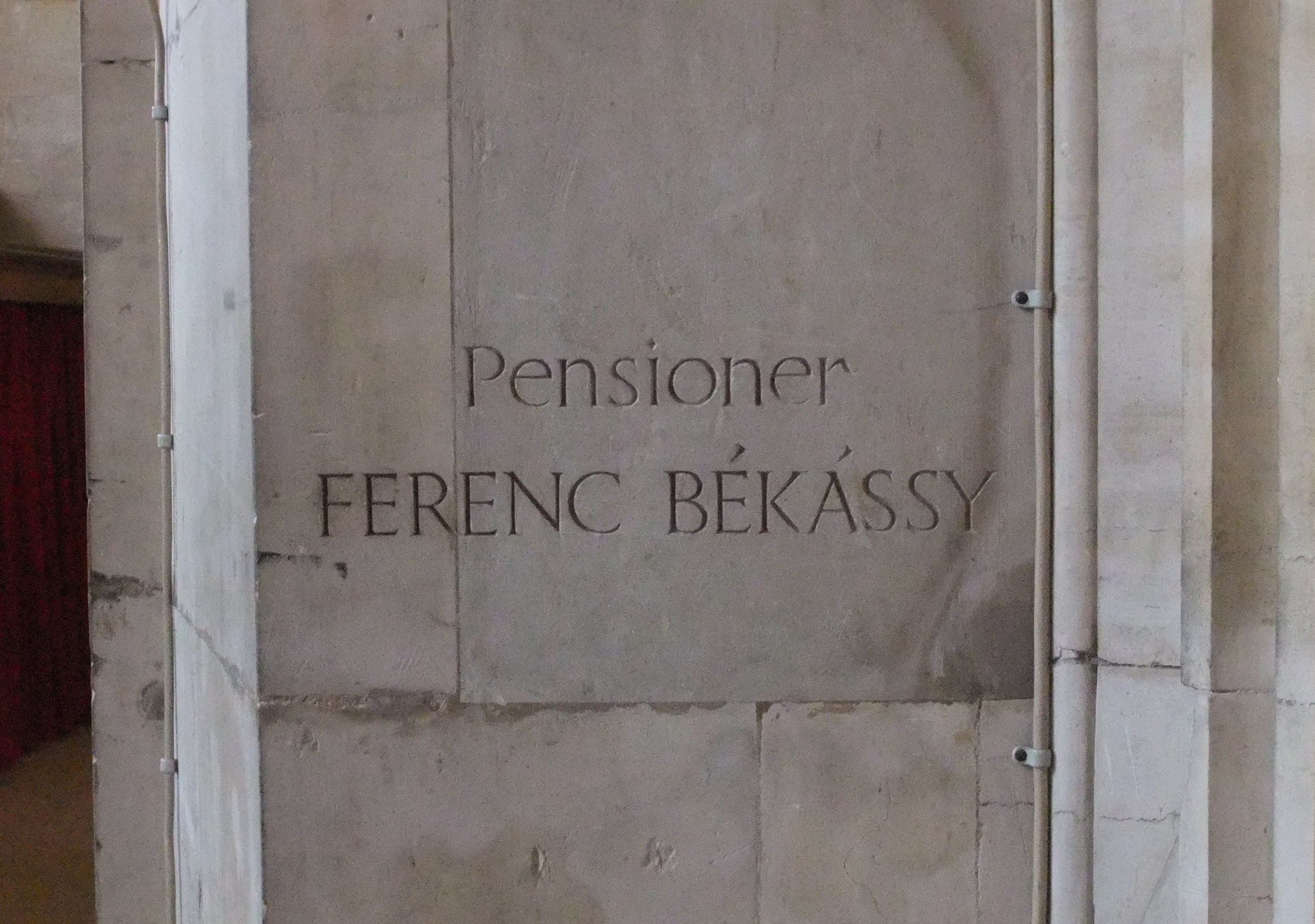
Memorial cut into the stonework of King's College Chapel, Cambridge

In a side chapel at King's College Chapel there is a plaque commemorating members of the college killed serving in the Great War, including Rupert Brooke. Carved into the stone of another wall there is a single name, that of Békássy. Keynes had asked the college to include him among those commemorated but another of the Fellows of King's, who had lost a son in the war, objected to the name of someone who had died fighting the Allies being listed with the other fallen.

A collection of his poems in English, edited by F. L. Lucas, was published in 1925 by Leonard and Virginia Woolf's Hogarth Press.

== Works ==
- Ferenc Bekassy: Adriatica and other poems; a selection, with preface (Hogarth Press, 1925)
- Békássy Ferenc egybegyűjtött írásai; edited by Tibor Weiner Sennyey (Budapest, 2010)

== Bibliography ==
The Alien in the Chapel: Ferenc Békássy, Rupert Brooke's Unknown Rival by George Gömöri & Mari Gömöri (2016)
