= E. L. Grant Watson =

American biologist and writer (1885–1970)

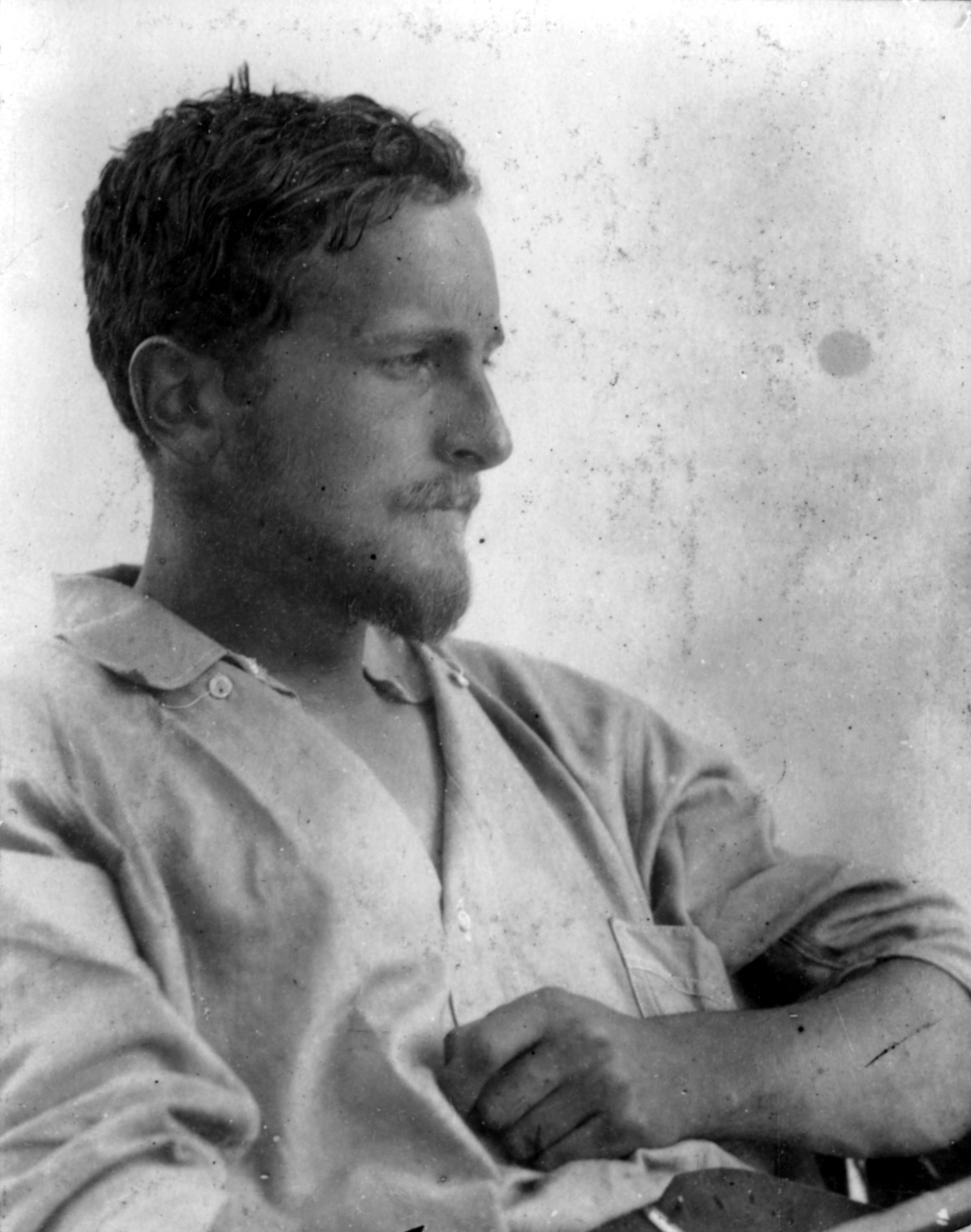
- E. L. Grant Watson, Perth 1910
- Born: Elliot Lovegood Grant Watson; June 14, 1885; Staines, Middlesex, England
- Died: 21 May 1970 (aged 84); Hampshire, England
- Occupations: Writer and biologist

Elliot Lovegood Grant Watson (14 June 1885 – 21 May 1970) was a writer and biologist. Among some 40 books and many essays and short stories he wrote six 'Australian' novels and several scientific-philosophical works that challenge Darwinism, or the mechanism of evolutionary theory, as an entire explanation for the development of life on earth.

== Biography ==
Born at Staines, Middlesex in England, the son of a successful London barrister, Reginald Grant Watson, and Lucy, née Fuller, a strong-minded woman with an interest in natural history and literature, 'Peter' (as he was called) visited Australia first as a child in 1890, soon after the death of his younger brother. During this visit, to relatives in Tasmania, his father also died. In rather more impoverished circumstances, Grant Watson was educated at Bedales School and Trinity College, Cambridge (B.A., 1909, with first-class honours in natural sciences) after which, at 24, he joined social anthropologist Alfred Brown (later Alfred Radcliffe-Brown) and Daisy Bates on an ethnological expedition in Western Australia. His experiences in the desert country at Southern Cross (near Kalgoorlie) and at Sandstone in the Murchison region, and later at the Aboriginal lock hospitals of Shark Bay, determined him to become a writer.

After further travels in Fiji, Canada and Ceylon he enlisted in the British Army but after a mental breakdown was seconded to perform biological research with parasitologist Clifford Dobell the Burroughs-Wellcome laboratory for tropical diseases in London. Later he taught officer cadets at a private college in Storrington.

On 17 July 1919 at Hampstead registry office he married Katharine Hannay.

During his writing career, by nature restless, he moved between a succession of homes in the English countryside and the expatriate colonies of pre-war Florence and Paris; through Bohemian London and prohibition New York, to Palestine and the Arctic Circle, while navigating friendships with writers Joseph Conrad, Gertrude Stein, Havelock Ellis, D.H. Lawrence; poets Rupert Brooke, Edward Thomas and Ferenc Békássy, the psychologist Helton Godwin Baynes, Geoffrey Keynes, Mabel Dodge Luhan, naturalist Frank Fraser Darling, and—in later life—Owen Barfield and Carl Jung.

Grant Watson's works include fiction, nature essays (many illustrated by Charles Tunnicliffe), travel writing and metaphysical and philosophical studies. His Australian novels are important for their pioneering use of the desert as a metaphor for the Jungian subconscious, and prefigured aspects of the works of such Australian writers as Katharine Susannah Prichard, Patrick White and Randolph Stow, particularly in their early sympathy with Aboriginal and environmental interpretations of the landscape. His autobiographical works But to What Purpose: The Autobiography of a Contemporary (1946) and Journey Under the Southern Stars (1968) give vivid accounts of his physical and intellectual journeys. In later life he also supported himself through BBC radio broadcasts, extramural university lectures and practice as a lay psychologist.

Survived by his wife Katharine and two daughters Josephine and Bridget, Grant Watson died at Petersfield, Hampshire, on 21 May 1970 and was buried in nearby Steep churchyard under an oak marker, intended to last only as long as an oak tree.

After his death, the internationally known filmmaker Paul Cox based two feature films on his Australian works: The Nun and The Bandit (1992, based on the 1935 novel of the same name) and Exile (1994, based on the 1940 novel Priest Island). A collection of his writings, Descent of Spirit, edited by the Australian literary scholar Dorothy Green (Auchterlonie), was published in 1990. A biography, The Imago: E. L. Grant Watson & Australia, by Suzanne Falkiner, was released by UWA Publishing in 2011.

== Selected publications ==
=== Australian novels ===
- Where Bonds are Loosed 1914
- The Mainland 1917
- The Desert Horizon 1923
- Daimon 1925
- The Nun and the Bandit 1935
- The Partners 1933 (as Lost Man! 1934 U.S.)

=== Other novels ===
- Deliverance 1920
- Shadow and Sunlight 1921
- Moses: the Lord of the Prophets 1929
- Moonlight in Ur 1932
- It's Up to You 1933
- Country Holiday 1938 (for children)
- A Mighty Man of Valour 1939
- Priest Island 1940

=== Short stories ===
- Innocent Desires

=== Non-fiction ===
- English Country 1924
- With the Australian Aborigines 1930 (for children)
- The Common Earth 1932
- Enigmas of Natural History 1936 (published in England)
- Mysteries of Natural History 1937 (US republication of Enigmas of Natural History)
- Man and His Universe 1940
- Nature Abounding (ed) 1941
- Walking with Fancy 1943
- The Leaves Return 1947
- Profitable Wonders: Some Problems of Plant and Animal Life 1949
- What to Look for in Nature/Winter/Summer/Autumn/Spring 1959–61 (for children)
- Nature's Changing Course 1961
- The Mystery of Physical Life 1964
- Animals in Splendour 1967

=== Autobiography ===
- But to What Purpose 1946
- Departures 1948
- Journey under the Southern Stars 1968

=== Poems ===
- Four Sacred Women and Other Verses 1960
