= Charles Moseley (writer) =

British writer (born 1941)

Dr Charles W. R. D. Moseley
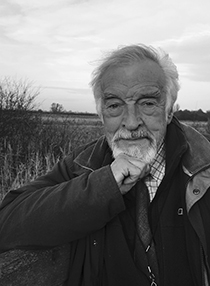
- Charles Moseley, Reach, 2022
- Born: 24 April 1941 (age 85); Lancashire, England
- Education: Queens' College, Cambridge; University of East Anglia
- Occupation: Writer
- Spouses: Jennifer Mary Williamson (m. 1962; died 2009); Rosanna Price (nee Gore) (m. 2017)
- Website: charlesmoseley.com

Charles Moseley (born 24 April 1941), who also publishes as C. W. R. D. Moseley is an English writer, scholar, and teacher, and a former fellow of Wolfson College and Life Fellow of Hughes Hall in Cambridge, as well as a fellow of the English Association, the Society of Antiquaries of London, and the Royal Society of Arts.

== Education ==
Moseley was born in Lancashire and educated at Beach Road County Primary School, Cleveleys, Arnold School, Blackpool (1952–59), Queens' College, Cambridge (BA, 1962), and received his PhD (entitled "Mandeville's travels: a study of the book and its importance in England, 1356–1750"). from the University of East Anglia in 1971.

== Career ==
From 1962 to 1973, while completing his PhD, Moseley worked in publishing, for Cambridge University Press as a management trainee, and subsequently for the University Tutorial Press as a commissioning editor. He taught English and Classics at The Leys School, Cambridge, full-time from 1973 to 1980 and part-time from 1980 to 1996, while also College Lecturer in English at Magdalene College from 1980 to 1986 and Director of Studies in English at Wolfson College from 1988 to 2000. In 2000 he became Director of Studies in English at Hughes Hall, and also served as Senior Tutor 2000-03 and Tutor 2003-08. From 2004-09 he was also Director of Studies at St Edmund's College. He was an Affiliated Lecturer of the Cambridge Faculty of English, and from 1992 to 2005 was Programme Director, for the University of Cambridge Institute of Continuing Education, of the International Summer School in English Literature, and from 1994 to 2005 the first Programme Director for the International Summer School in Shakespeare.

He was elected to fellowships of the Royal Geographical Society in 1972, of the Royal Society of Arts in 1994, of the Society of Antiquaries in 1999, and the English Association in 2001. He is also a member of the Society for Nautical Research, the Classical Association, and the Arctic Club, and was a consultant for the annual Responsibility of Wealth programmes run in Cambridge for the Society of International Business Fellows.

== Scholarship, teaching and writing ==
Moseley's principal interests are in the mediaeval and early modern periods, particularly Chaucer, Sir John Mandeville, Shakespeare, Milton, and the European emblem.

His Shakespearean work has centred on the history plays: between 1966 and 1974 he edited five Shakespeare plays for the University Tutorial Press – The Winter's Tale, 1 Henry IV, 2 Henry IV, Richard III, & Othello—and later wrote two studies for Penguin Books, Shakespeare's History Plays, Richard II to Henry V: The Making of a King (1988; digitally reissued, 2010) & Shakespeare: Richard III: A Critical Study (1989). More recently, he has written five digitally published guides for students: Reading Shakespeare's History Plays (2001), A Very Brief Introduction to Theatre and Theatres of Shakespeare's Time (2007), Shakespeare's Richard III: A Discussion (2007), Shakespeare's The Tempest (2007), & Shakespeare's King Henry IV (2007).

Moseley's Penguin Classics edition of The Travels of Sir John Mandeville (1983, revised and extended 2005) remains the standard edition for British and US universities, and his translation is noted for "convey[ing] the elegant style of the original". It was followed by two Penguin guides to Chaucer, Chaucer: The Knight's Tale: A Critical Study (1986) and Chaucer: The Pardoner's Tale: A Critical Study (1987). A Century of Emblems: An Introduction to the Renaissance Emblem (1989) is a rare and valuable guide to its subject, and The Poetic Birth: Milton's Poems of 1645 (1991) was subsequently issued by Penguin, without the Latin poems, as Milton: The English Poems of 1645 (1992). In 2021, he edited Engaging with Chaucer: Theory, Practice, Reading (Berghahn: New York and Oxford). Moseley has published more than 65 scholarly articles, the majority concerning Chaucer, Mandeville, and Shakespeare, and early modern theatre, and is a frequent reviewer for Modern Language Review and the Yearbook of English Studies. He also wrote the British Council Writers and their Work guide to J. R. R. Tolkien (1997).

A second strand of Moseley's work concerns personal and local history, particularly the effects of modernity on village life. A long-standing resident of Reach, he has published two studies, Reach: A Brief History of a Fenland Village (1988) and A Field Full of Folk: A Village Elegy (1995; as Out of Reach, 2010). The latter includes a more personal memoir, and has an autobiographical prequel, Between the Tides: A Lancashire Youth (2014). A further memoir, Latitude North (2015), concerns Moseley's interest in polar history, biology, and historical experience. He also wrote A Brief Architectural Guide to the Church of St Mary the Virgin, Swaffham Prior (1980), and with the poet Clive Wilmer edited Cambridge Observed: An Anthology (1998). His Coming to Terms: Cambridge In and Out (2017) is a mixture of personal memoir and anecdote about the Cambridge and Cambridgeshire in which he has lived and worked for 60 years. He has also published the much praised Hungry Heart Roaming (Eyewear, 2021), a very personal engagement, prompted by place and travel, with European history from the Fall of Troy to the Fall of Berlin in 1945. In 2022 his To Everything a Season: The View from the Fen, a closely and affectionately observed account of the changing year in East Anglia, was published by Merlin Unwin Books. Also in 2022, his Crossroad: A Pilgrimage of Unknowing was published by Darton London and Todd. This, the first explicitly religious book he has written, picks up once more the journey/wandering/pilgrimage theme that fascinates him, but is also a sustained meditation on the nature and force of memory in a place, and the possibility of knowledge and certainty.

Moseley's influence as a teacher and lecturer is shown in his long association with the Cambridge International Summer Schools, where his Programme Directorship in English Literature saw the numbers of courses and registrants expand considerably, and the foundation of a distinct Shakespeare Summer School which after his retirement was directed by Catherine Alexander and Fred Parker. He was a founding partner of and Literature Editor for Humanities-ebooks, a digital academic publisher committed to lower prices for readers and higher royalty payments for authors. He has three times been an Evelyn Wrench Speaker for the English Speaking Union of the United States (1993, 1995, 2000), is a frequent lecturer on study cruises for Saga, Fred. Olsen Cruise Lines, and Voyages of Adventure, and has been a plenary speaker at conferences in Lisbon, Bucharest, Innsbruck, and Szeged.

Moseley's former pupils include Stephanie Merritt, F. C. Malby (novelist), Emily Maitlis, Professor Dr S. I. Sobecki (University of Toronto), Professor Russell Hillier (Providence College), Professor Katherine Steele Brokaw (University of California, Merced), Cord-Christian Casper, (Department of English, Ludwig-Maximilians-Universität München), Professor Greg Clingham, Dr Richard Keith (Central School of Speech and Drama), Gavin Tranter (barrister), Mark Bishop (judge and Anglican priest, Chancellor of the Diocese of Lincoln), Nicholas J. Hoffman (financier), James Marshall CBE, and Matthew Rycroft CBE.

== Personal life ==
Moseley's memoirs include several unusual experiences for an academic, including a stint as a deckhand on deep-sea trawlers, and extensive travels in Antarctica, Greenland, Spitsbergen, and Iceland. In 1976 he was Deputy Leader of an expedition that sledged across the Spitsbergen icecap. He also maintained a smallholding in Reach for more than 20 years.

In 1962, Moseley married Jennifer Mary Williamson (19 June 1940 – 22 October 2009). They had two children.
In 2017, he married Rosanna Price (née Gore) – born 2 April 1960 – graduate of Emmanuel College, Cambridge, an acupuncturist and Zero Balancing practitioner in Cambridge (now also known as Rosanna Moseley Gore) and author of Songs from the Suitcase: Inhabiting an Inheritance (Beaten Track Publishing, 2024).

== Bibliography ==
=== Books ===
- To the Eel Island: An Evening Journey (Merlin Unwin Books, 2025)
- A Joyful Noise: Some Hymn Writers, Their Times & Their Hymns (Darton Longman and Todd, 2024)
- Etheldreda's World: Princess, Abbess, Saint (Merlin Unwin Books, 2023)
- Crossroad: A Pilgrimage of Unknowing (Darton Longman and Todd. 2022)
- To Everything a Season: the View from the Fen (Merlin Unwin Books, 2022)
- Engaging with Chaucer: Theory, Practice, Reading (Berghahn: New York and Oxford, 2021)
- Hungry Heart Roaming (Eyewear, 2021)
- J. R. R. Tolkien (Liverpool University Press, 2018)
- Coming to Terms (London: IndieBooks, 2017)
- Latitude North (London: IndieBooks, 2015)
- Between the Tides: A Lancashire Youth (Burscough: Beaten Track Publishing, 2014)
- A Very Brief Introduction to Theatre and Theatres of Shakespeare's Time (Tirrill: Humanities-Ebooks, 2007)
- Shakespeare's Richard III: A Discussion (Tirrill: Humanities-Ebooks, 2007)
- Shakespeare's The Tempest (Tirrill: Humanities-Ebooks, 2007)
- Shakespeare's King Henry IV (Tirrill: Humanities-Ebooks, 2007)
- Reading Shakespeare's History Plays (London: Bloomsbury.com, 2001)
- Cambridge Observed: An Anthology (ed. Charles Moseley & Clive Wilmer, Cambridge: Colt Books, 1998)
- Writers and their Work: J. R. R. Tolkien (London: Northcote House/British Council, 1997)
- A Field Full of Folk: A Village Elegy (London: Aurum Press, 1995; 2/e, as Out of Reach, Cambridge: G. David, 2010)
- Milton: The English Poems of 1645 (Harmondsworth: Penguin & New York: Viking Penguin, 1992)
- The Poetic Birth: Milton's Poems of 1645 (Aldershot: Scolar Press, 1991)
- A Century of Emblems: An Introduction to the Renaissance Emblem (Aldershot: Scolar Press, 1989)
- Shakespeare: Richard III: A Critical Study (Harmondsworth: Penguin, 1989)
- Shakespeare's History Plays, Richard II to Henry V: The Making of a King (Harmondsworth: Penguin, 1988; digital ed., Tirrill: Humanities-Ebooks, 2010)
- Reach: A Brief History of a Fenland Village (Cambridge: Daana Press, 1988; new ed., 1999)
- Chaucer: The Pardoner's Tale: A Critical Study (Harmondsworth: Penguin, 1987)
- Chaucer: The Knight's Tale: A Critical Study (Harmondsworth: Penguin, 1986)
- The Travels of Sir John Mandeville (ed. and trans. Charles Moseley, Harmondsworth: Penguin, 1983; 2/e, rev. and expanded, 2005 [Penguin Classics])
- A Brief Architectural Guide to the Church of St Mary the Virgin, Swaffham Prior (Swaffham Prior: Parochial Church Council, 1980)
- William Shakespeare, Othello (ed. Charles Moseley, London: University Tutorial Press, 1974)
- William Shakespeare, King Richard III (ed. Charles Moseley, London: University Tutorial Press, 1968)
- William Shakespeare, King Henry IV, Part 1 (ed. Charles Moseley, London: University Tutorial Press, 1967)
- William Shakespeare, King Henry IV, Part 2 (ed. Charles Moseley, London: University Tutorial Press, 1966)
- William Shakespeare, The Winter's Tale (ed. Charles Moseley, London: University Tutorial Press, 1966)
- A. J. Wyatt, A History of English Literature (revised by Charles Moseley, London: University Tutorial Press, 1965)

=== Chapters and articles ===
- ‘Faith: still light in the darkness’, Church Times, January 2025
- ‘Pilgrimage, Memory, Place’, in C. Singer and C. Ehland (eds.), (Un)making Place, (Leiden: Brill, in the Press)
- ‘Thomas Campion’s “There is a Garden in her Face”: text, context, subtext’, Early Modern Culture Online. (in the Press)
- ‘No Middle Flight’: the Audacity of Paradise Lost’, in Navigating Cultural Identities and Histories. In Memoriam Mihaela Irimia (1951-2022), Eds: Dragoș Ivana, Alexandra Bacalu, Andreea Paris-Popa (University of Bucharest, 2025)
- ‘Learning when less is more’, Church Times, 4 October 2024
- ‘Reflections on a Rough Passage', Church Times, August, 2024
- ‘Shall Earth her fruits afford?', Church Times, March 2024, June 2024
- ‘Thinking about Pilate’, Church Times, March 2024
- ‘The Crown of Thorns’, Church Times, March 2024
- ‘Mind, Body, Spirit’, Church Times, 10 February 2024
- ‘Exposure of the Strong Man’, Church Times, 5 January 2024
- ‘Trailing Clouds of Glory’, Church Times 1 December 2023
- ‘Past, Present, Still to Come’ Church Times 27 October 2023
- ‘No Sense Of An Ending: Revisiting Middle Earth’, special issue on J. R. R. Tolkien, Forma de Vida 27 (December 2023) https://formadevida.org/#enfdv27
- ‘The Hierarchies of Heaven’, Church Times, 23 September 2023
- ‘Translating Etheldreda: a Tawdry Tale’, Ancient Origins,(August, 2023)
- ‘Etheldreda’, Catholic Herald, June 2023
- ‘Shakespeare’s canon’, Early Modern Culture Online, Vol 8 No 1 (2022) pp.23-37
- ‘The Travels of Sir John Mandeville.’ Routledge. https://doi.org/10.4324/9780415791182-RMEO41-1 (2022)
- 'The marvels, the mystery, the man: reflections on re-reading Mandeville's Travels', 'Forma de Vida', 22 (2022)
- 'Shakespeare's canon', Early Modern Culture Online, Vol 8 No 1 (2022) pp.23-37
- '"Look on this picture, and on this": or "words, words, words"?' in L'Image Brisée XVIe-XVIIe siècles / Breaking the Image 16th-17th centuries, Agnès Lafont, Christian Belin and Nicholas Myers (eds.), Paris: Classiques Garnier, (2019).
- 'The Travels of Sir John Mandeville', in the Routledge Online Encyclopaedia of Medieval Studies (2018).
- Editorial essay as Guest Editor in Chaucer: Theory, Practice, Reading: Critical Survey,30, (2), 2018.pp. 1-5
- Editorial essay as Guest Editor in Chaucer: Theory, Practice, Reading, Critical Survey,29 (3), 2017.pp. 1-5
- '"Tu numeris elementa ligas": The Consolation of Nature's Numbers in Parlement of Foulys', in Chaucer: Theory, Practice, Reading: Critical Survey,29 (3), 2017.pp. 86-113.
- 'Ancestral Voices', in Literature and Cultural Memory, ed. Dragos Manea and Andreea Paris, (Amsterdam: Brill, 2017)
- 'Emblems and Emblematics', Cambridge World Shakespeare Encyclopaedia, ed. Bruce Smith (Cambridge and New York: Cambridge University Press, 2016)
- (joint author) 'The Case for Reclassifying the Hythe, Reach, Cambridgeshire as a site of historic and archaeological significance', Proceedings of the Cambridge Antiquarian Society, 2016, pp. 61-4
- Mandeville's Travels and the Moral Geography of the Medieval World', Portal: Journal of Multidisciplinary International Studies, University of Technology, Sydney, epress, Vol 11 n°2, (2015).
- 'Shakespeare, 'The Spanish Armada and the Mississippi', Early Modern Culture On Line, 6 (2015) pp.10-21
- 'Forging the Key of Remembrance: Books, Cultures and Memory', in Literature and the Long Modernity (ed. Michaela Irimia, Amsterdam: Rodopi, 2014 [Internationale Forschungen zur Allgemeinen und Vergleichenden Literaturwissenschaft 176]), pp. 11–24
- 'Judicious, Sharp Spectators? Form, Pattern and Audience in Early Modern Theatre: Some Problems', in Cahiers Élisabéthains 85 (Spring 2014): 7–20
- 'What's in a Name? The Theatre of 1576', in Early Modern Culture Online 5 (2014): 1–10
- 'Speaking Pictures: Mediaeval Religious Art and its Viewers', in The Edinburgh Companion to the Bible (ed. Stephen Prickett, Edinburgh: Edinburgh University Press, 2014), pp. 175–94
- ' Res Publica: A Matter of Concern', in Representações da República (ed. Luis Manuel A. V. Bernardo, Leonor Santa Barbara, & Luis Andrade, Lisbon: Húmus, for Fundação para Ciéncia e a Tecnologia, 2013), pp. 29–39
- 'Action is Eloquence: Text, Script, Performance, and the Failure of Criticism', in The Said and the Unsaid: Papers on Language, Literature and Cultural Studies (ed. A. Panajoti, Vlora: University of Vlora Ismail Qemali, 2011), pp. 29–47
- 'How the Devil did he learn our Language?: Richard III and his Languages', in English Studies in Albania 1.1 (2011): 7–22
- 'The Groves of Eden, vanished now so long ...: Landscape, Art and Ideology in Picturing the Lost Domain', in Milton Through the Centuries (ed. Gábor Ittzés & Miklós Péti, Budapest: KGRE-L'Harmattan, 2011), pp. 284–97
- 'New things to speak of: Money, Memory and Mandeville's Travels in Early Modern England', in Yearbook of English Studies Special Issue: Early Modern Travel Fiction 41.1 (N. Das, ed., 2011): 5–20
- 'Whet-stone leasings of old Maundevile: Reading the Travels in Early Modern England', in Mandeville and Mandevillian Lore in Early Modern England (ed. Ladan Niayesh, Manchester: Manchester University Press, 2011), pp. 28–50
- 'Introducing Mr Shakespeare, or What's in a Title Page?', in T. Ozawa et al., A Kaleidoscope of Literature: English and American Literatures, and their Surrounding Areas (trans. T. Ozawa, Tokyo: Renga Shobo Shinsa, 2010), pp. 266–311
- 'The Literary and Dramatic Context of the Late Plays', in The Cambridge Companion to Shakespeare's Last Plays (ed. C. M. Alexander, Cambridge: Cambridge University Press, 2009), pp. 47–69
- '... To arrive where we started and know the place for the first time', in (Ex)patriations: Papers from the First International Conference (ed. Adina Ciugureana, Constanța: Ovidius University Press, 2009), pp. 15–29
- 'Mandeville and the Amazons', in Jean de Mandeville in Europa: Neue Perspektiven in der Reiseliteraturforschung (ed. Ernst Bremer & Susanne Röhl, München: Fink Verlag, 2007 [Mittelalter Studien 12]), pp. 67–9
- 'Astraea in the Alps', in The Classical Association Newsletter 35 (December 2006): 8–9
- 'A Portrait of Sir Christopher Hatton, Erasmus, and an Emblem of Alciato: Some Questions', in The Antiquaries' Journal 86 (2006): 373–9
- 'Waiting for the death of Little Nell: Gas, Flong, and the Nineteenth-century Novel', in TRANS: Internet-Zeitschrift fur Kultur-Wissenschaften 16 (2006)
- 'Get thee up into a high Mountain: The English Lake District as Virtual Landscape', in TRANS: Internet-Zeitschrift fur Kultur-Wissenschaften 15 (2004)
- 'William Shakespeare', in The Continuum Encyclopedia of British Literature (ed. S. Serafin, New York: Continuum, 2002), pp. 892–6
- 'Foreword', in O. B. Duane, Chivalry (Leicester: Brockhampton Press, 1997), p. 8
- 'Les Mondes des Voyages de Jean de Mandeville', in Résurgences: Recherches aux Sources et aux Confluents de la Littérature 2.1 (Spring 1993): 4–14
- 'What shall we do with the Seventeenth Century?', editorial essay in special issue 'Writing/Revolution: The Seventeenth Century', Critical Survey 5.3 (1993): 219–22
- 'Portia's Music and the Naughty World', in The Merchant of Venice: Critical Essays (ed. Bryan Loughrey & Linda Cookson, London: Longmans, 1992), pp. 19–40
- 'Editorial Essay' in special issue 'Shakespeare and Tragedy', Critical Survey 3.2 (1991): 115–17
- 'Andrew Willett's Emblem Book: A Reconsideration', in The Yearbook of English Studies XX (1990): 182–207
- 'British Library Additional MS 24189: Some Curious Ships', in Mariner's Mirror 76.2 (1990): 176–7
- 'Innogen's Bedroom', in Notes and Queries 235 (June 1990): 197–8
- 'A Sweetnesse readie penn'd: Art, Love and Devotion in Herbert's The Temple', in The Metaphysical Poets: Critical Essays (ed. Bryan Loughrey & Linda Cookson, London: Longmans, 1990), pp. 58–68
- 'The Pardoner versus his Tale', in The Pardoner's Tale: Critical Essays (ed. Bryan Loughrey & Linda Cookson, London: Longmans, 1990), pp. 46–54
- 'Speaking Pictures: Visual Symbol in Antony and Cleopatra', in Antony and Cleopatra: Critical Essays (ed. Bryan Loughrey & Linda Cookson, London: Longmans, 1990), pp. 84–92
- 'A Surviving Fenland Lighter', in Mariner's Mirror 76.3 (1990): 279–81
- 'This Blessed Plot: The Garden Scene in Richard II', in Richard II: Critical Essays (ed. Bryan Loughrey & Linda Cookson, London: Longmans, 1989), pp. 94–104
- 'The General Prologue as a Prologue', in The Canterbury Tales: Critical Essays (ed. Bryan Loughrey & Linda Cookson, London: Longmans, 1989), pp. 105–18
- 'Men were Deceivers Ever', in Much Ado about Nothing: Critical Essays (ed. Bryan Loughrey & Linda Cookson, London: Longmans, 1989), pp. 43–52
- 'Of Centaurs and Minotaurs: Vaenius' Emblem Nihil Silentio Utilius and Alciato's Non Vulganda Consilia', in Bulletin du Bibliophile (1989): 324–30
- 'A Note on Possible Acrostics in Paradise Lost', in Notes and Queries 233 (June 1988): 162–3
- 'MacBeth's Free Fall', in Macbeth: Critical Essays (ed. Bryan Loughrey & Linda Cookson, London: Longmans, 1988), pp. 22–34
- 'Trial and Judgement in King Lear', in King Lear: Critical Essays (ed. Bryan Loughrey & Linda Cookson, London: Longmans, 1988), pp. 65–75
- 'The Masque Unmask'd: Spectacle in The Tempest', in The Tempest: Critical Essays (ed. Bryan Loughrey & Linda Cookson, London: Longmans, 1988), pp. 114–26
- 'Cleopatra's Prudence: Three Notes on the Use of Emblems in Antony and Cleopatra', in Shakespeare Jahrbuch (West) (1986): 119–37
- 'Behaim's Globe and Mandeville's Travels', in Imago Mundi XXXIII (1981): 82–93
- 'The Computer and the School Library', in Conference XVII, No. 1 (1980): 11
- 'A Reading of Donne's Holy Sonnet XIV', in Archiv für das Studium der neueren Sprachen und Literaturen CCXVII (1980): 103–08
- 'Some Suggestions about the Writing of The Squire's Tale', in Archiv für das Studium der neueren Sprachen und Literaturen CCXII (1975): 124–7
- 'The Availability of Mandeville's Travels in England', in The Library XXX, No. 1 (1975): 125–33
- 'The Metamorphoses of Sir John Mandeville', in The Yearbook of English Studies IV (1974): 5–25
- 'Chaucer, Sir John Mandeville and the Alliterative Revival: An Hypothesis Concerning Relationships', in Modern Philology LXXII, No. 2 (1974): 182–4
- 'Richard Head's The English Rogue', in The Yearbook of English Studies I (1971): 102–07
- 'Sir John Mandeville's Visit to the Pope: The Implications of an Interpolation', in Neophilologus LIV, No. 1 (1970): 77–80
- 'The Lost Play of Mandeville', in The Library XXV, No. 1 (1970): 46–9
- 'Stitched Ships and Loadstone Rocks', in Notes and Queries 213 (September 1968): 323
