= Rima Alamuddin =

Lebanese-Swiss writer

- Born: 1941; Beirut
- Died: September 11, 1963 (aged 21–22); Shemlan, Lebanon
- Cause of death: Murder
- Education: American University in Beirut; Girton College, Cambridge
- Occupation: Author
- Known for: Poetry and piano composition, the Rima Alamuddin Prize at Girton College
- Notable work: The Sun is Silent
- Parents: Najib Alamuddin (father); Dr. Ida Kunzler (mother)
- Family: Alam al-Din dynasty

Rima Alamuddin (1941–1963) was a Lebanese–Swiss writer, and one of the first Arab female authors to publish in English.

== Biography ==
=== Early life and education ===
Rima Alamuddin was born in Beirut, in 1941 to a Swiss Protestant mother, Dr. Ida Kunzler, and Lebanese Druze father, Najib Salim Alamuddin, director of Middle East Airlines. She was the eldest child.

During her childhood years, Rima attended private schools in Lebanon and Switzerland. She began her education in the Protestant College, the Lebanese College of Souk-el-Gharb, and the Ahliah College for Girls followed by a year (1958-59) at the International School of Geneva, where she was praised by her teachers for her "mature" style of writing in English. She then continued her education at the American University of Beirut where she graduated with a B.A. in English Literature and high distinction. Rima proceeded to study at Girton College, Cambridge, reading and writing in English.

At the age of 19, Rima decided to begin her career as an author. Her work was published in several sources, including "Outlook", the American University of Beirut newspaper, "Girton Review", and the joint Oxford and Cambridge publication, "Carcanet".

Rima enjoyed films, plays, reading, and was a great pianist. While a member of the A.U.B. Drama Club Rima appeared in An Enemy of the People, The Queen and the Rebels, Look Homeward, Angel, and The Mousetrap.

=== Death and afterward ===
On 11 September 1963, Rima was killed outside her parents' home in the town of Shemlan at the age of 22. A man she had refused to marry, Samir Farah, shot her and then committed suicide. As described by Peter Grey, Rima's untimely death deprived the world of the many future works that Rima would have created.

Rima's parents received many tributes from several people who knew her and worked with her, including her professors in AUB and Girton College. Her father, Najib Alamuddin expressed remorse for Rima's murder, writing in his autobiography that he wished he had given more time to his family and less to Middle East Airlines, that maybe he could have saved her.

== Published works ==
Although Rima drew her ideas from Western Culture, her works reflected a Lebanese Middle-Eastern atmosphere. Peter Grey describes Rima's poetry as "delicate" and "beautiful": usually reflecting European scenes even though her characters and plots were oriental.

- "Spring to Summer" (1963). Published in London and Beirut, Rima's first novel, "Spring to Summer," tells the narrative of Samar Khaldy, a young Lebanese girl who accepted her fate as a university student with little aspirations. In addition, the book included Akram Said, who fled his hometown in south Lebanon to live in Beirut. He had a history of terrible behavior, including stealing and murder, before enrolling in university. Then he showed up in Samar's life, but the story is mostly about a man and a society that can only accept him when it has broken him. Above all, it is the narrative of Samar, who grew from a toddler in March to a woman in August (from spring to summer). She finally accepted the responsibility of being part of everything to destroy the man she loved. Samar is nearly destroyed by Akram until she managed to get out of this toxic relationship.
- "Beyond the Wall" ( January 1963). This short story was published in Carcanet 2, and Rima was the only woman among 11 other people whose works were published. The story is about a young girl who runs away from home after a family dispute. Away from home at night, the girl encounters a man whose intentions are questionable. Eventually, she runs back home, with a vision of a swarm of men.
- "The Sun Is Silent" (1964). This book contains several short stories and novels published by Hodder and Stoughton after Rima's death.
- "The Years of Youth" (1964). "The Years of Youth" is a volume of poetry written by Rima throughout the years, also published posthumously.

== Recognition ==
Girton College created the "Rima Alamuddin Prize"; awarded every year for a creation in literature or a musical performance.

== See also ==
- Alam al-Din dynasty, Alamuddin's father Najib was head of the dynasty, known as the "Flying Sheikh"
- Jakob Künzler, Alamuddin's grandfather on her mother's side
