= George Gomori (writer) =

Hungarian-born poet, writer and academic (born 1934)

- Born: April 3, 1934 (age 92)
- Writing career
- Language: Hungarian
- Genre: Poetry

George Gomori (Hungarian: Gömöri György; born 3 April 1934) is a Hungarian-born poet, writer and academic. He has lived in England since 1956, after fleeing Budapest after the Hungarian Revolution, in which he played a pivotal role. He writes poems in Hungarian, many of which have been translated into English and Polish, and other writings across all three languages. He is a regular contributor to British newspaper The Guardian and to The Times Literary Supplement.

== Early life and education ==
Gomori was born in Budapest in 1934. From 1953 to 1956 he studied Hungarian and Polish at Eötvös Loránd University. He took part in the 1956 revolution both as a student organiser and editor of the newspaper Egyetemi ifjúság (University Youth). After the suppression of the revolution he fled to England and continued his studies at the University of Oxford where in 1962 completed a B.Litt. thesis on Polish and Hungarian literature later published as his first book in English (Polish and Hungarian Poetry 1945 to 1956; Oxford, 1966). Between 1958 and 1961 he was member of the Executive of the Hungarian Writers Association Abroad.

== Teaching and scholarly career ==
His first teaching job was at the University of California, Berkeley, after which he researched at Harvard University (1964–65). Having spent four years as researcher and librarian at the University of Birmingham, in 1969 he took up a position at the University of Cambridge teaching Polish and Hungarian literature until his retirement in 2001.

In May 2017 he was appointed as Senior Research Associate of the UCL School of Slavonic and East European Studies.

== Literary publications ==
He has published twelve books of poetry in Hungarian, four in English and one in Polish, and is the author of numerous critical works on Polish and Hungarian literature, the latest of which were Magnetic Poles (London, 2000), and Erdélyi Merítések ("Transylvanian Catches", Cluj-Kolozsvár, 2004). With Clive Wilmer he has translated two books of poems by Miklós Radnóti (1979, 2003), two collections by György Petri (1991, 1999, the second collection shortlisted for the Weidenfeld Translation Prize) and co-edited with George Szirtes a representative anthology of modern Hungarian poetry, The Colonnade of Teeth (Bloodaxe Books, Newcastle, 1996). From 1992 to 2006 he was a member of the Executive of the Association of the Hungarian Language and Culture of Budapest, also serving on the Board of the Hungarian Writers' Association (2001–2004).

== Awards and medals ==
In 1995 he was awarded the Officer's Cross of the Republic of Hungary and in 2007 the Commander's Cross of the Republic of Hungary. His literary and scholarly prizes include the Jurzykowski Award (1972), Medal of the Polish Committee of National Education (1992), Salvatore Quasimodo Prize (1993), the Ada Negri Memorial Prize (1995), the Pro Cultura Hungarica (1999) the Lotz Memorial Medal (2006), and the Alföld Prize (2009). He is a member of the Hungarian PEN Club and the Society of Hungarian Studies (London), also of the Polish Academy of Arts and Sciences (PAU) of Cracow. In 2001, he was shortlisted alongside his translation partner Clive Wilmer for the Oxford-Weidenfeld Translation Prize for a book of György Petri poems which they translated from Hungarian to English. In 2014 he was awarded the Janus Pannonius prize for Translation of Poetry and the Hídverő ('Bridge Builders') Prize in Székelyudvarhely, Romania.

In 2014 he was made Senator of the University of Szeged in recognition of his scholarly and artistic achievements. In June 2021, he was given the Award of the Polish Ministry of Culture and National Heritage, for work on Cyprian Norwid.

In October 2023, he was given the János Bárány Award (Ferencváros, 9th District of Budapest).

He was award The Polish Writers Association Abroad's Literary Prize in 2024.

== Recent work ==
Gömöri is a regular contributor to the British press (The Guardian, The Independent) as well as to the American bimonthly World Literature Today. Several essays of his were published in Polish publication Odra Wrocław. He also continues publishing in Hungarian, English and Polish. His reminiscences of Czesław Miłosz were included in Cynthia L. Haven's An Invisible Rope: Portraits of Czesław Miłosz in 2011.

He is also a member of Trinity College, Cambridge and emeritus fellow of Darwin College, Cambridge, where for a number of years edited the college newsletter. For over three decades he has been on the editorial board of the American quarterly Books Abroad and its continuation World Literature Today. He is also on the editorial board of Lymbus Budapest and Litteraria Copernicana Toruń.

2014 saw a new book of his poetry published, Rózsalovaglás (Riding with Roses), by Pro Pannonia Publishers and his collected essays on the late Renaissance poet Bálint Balassi (A rejtőzködő Balassi) published in Hungarian by Komp-Press in Romania. His latest poetry collection in English, Polishing October: New and Selected Poems (Shoestring Press) was recently reviewed in World Literature Today.

== Family life ==
He has two daughters from his first marriage, Beata and Anna, and with his second wife Mari has brought up three sons, Daniel, Peter and Ben.

The neo-classical and modernist Hungarian painter and engraver, Jenő Medveczky was his step-father.

== Bibliography ==
- Virág-bizonyság (Evidence of Flowers, poems in Hungarian), London, 1958
- Hajnali úton (On a Dawn Road, poems in Hungarian) London, 1963
- Borisz Paszternák: Karácsonyi csillag (BP's post-1945 poetry in Hungarian.With Vince Sulyok), Occidental Press, Washington, 1965
- Polish and Hungarian Poetry 1945 to 1956,(a study in comparative literature), Clarendon Press, Oxford, 1966
- New Writing of East Europe (Anthology based on the East European number of Tri-Quarterly; edited with Charles Newman), Quadrangle Press, Chicago, 1968
- Átváltozások (Metamorphoses, poems in Hungarian and verse translations into Hungarian), London, 1969
- Új égtájak (anthology of the 1956 generation of Hungarian poets in exile. Ed with Vilmos Juhász) Occidental Press, Washington, 1969
- Attila József: Selected Poems and Texts (tr. John Batki; ed. with James Atlas), Carcanet Press, Cheadle Hulme, 1973
- László Nagy: Love of the Scorching Wind. Selected Poems, (partly tr., and ed. with Gyula Kodolányi), OUP, Oxford-New York-Toronto, 1974
- Cyprian Norwid (monograph), Twayne, New York, 1974
- Levél hanyatló birodalomból (Letter from a Declining Empire, poems in Hungarian) Munich, 1976
- Az ismeretlen fa.. Mai lengyel költők (The Unknown Tree. Anthology of Modern Polish poets in Hungarian translation, ed. and tr.), Occidental Press, Washington, 1978
- Miklós Radnóti: Forced March. Selected Poems, (ed. and transl. With Clive Wilmer), Carcanet Press, Manchester, 1979
- Homage to Mandelstam (multilingual verse anthology, ed. with Richard Burns), LOS, Cambridge, 1981
- Nyugtalan koranyár (Restless Early Summer, poems in Hungarian), Occidental Press, Washington, 1984
- Polscy poeci o wegierskim pazdzierniku (Polish Poets on the Hungarian October, verse anthology in Polish and partly in Hungarian, ed. and tr.), Polish Cultural Foundation, London, 1986; 2nd, enlarged edition London, 1996
- Cyprian Norwid. Poet, thinker, craftsman (essays by different hands, introduced and an essay; ed. with B.Mazur), SSEES-Univ.of London/ Orbis Books, London, 1988
- Angol-magyar kapcsolatok a XVI-XVII században (Anglo-Hungarian Contacts in the 15–16th centuries, essays), Akadémiai Kiadó, 1989
- Búcsú a romantikától (Farewell to Romanticism- Selected Poems in Hungarian), Magvető, Budapest, 1990
- Nyugatról nézve (Seen from the West, essays), Szépirodalmi, Budapest, 1990
- Erdélyiek és angolok (Transylvanians and Englishmen, essays) Héttorony, Budapest, 1991
- György Petri: Night Song of the Personal Shadow. Selected Poems.(Tr.and ed. with Clive Wilmer)Bloodaxe, Newcastle, 1991
- As if...Three Hungarian Poets (Verse anthology ed. by George Szirtes; poems of Győző Ferencz, Zsuzsa Rakovszky and George Gömöri), The Cheltenham Festival, Cheltenham, 1991
- Angol és skót utazók a régi Magyarországon, 1541–1737 (English and Scottish Travellers in the Hungary of the Past, 1541–1737, ed. and translated), Argumentum, Budapest, 1994
- George Gömöri: My Manifold City.Selected Poems (Tr. from the Hungarian with Clive Wilmer, also by Tony Connor and George Szirtes), The Alba Press, Cambridge, 1996, 2nd ed. printed in Budapest, 1996
- The Colonnade of Teeth. Modern Hungarian Poetry, ed. and introduced with George Szirtes, notes by George Gömöri, Bloodaxe, Newcastle, 1996
- Egy szigetlakó feljegyzéseiből (From the Notebook of an Islander, essays, reviews), Cserépfalvi, Budapest, 1996
- Őszi magánbeszéd. Versek 1945–1996, (Autumn Monologue, Poems in Hungarian), Szivárvány; Chicago-Budapest, 1997
- Zbigniew Herbert: Az izlés hatalma (a selection translated from Herbert's poems into Hungarian), Orpheus, Budapest, 1998
- A bujdosó Balassitól a meggyászolt Zrínyi Miklósig, (From the Exiled Balassi to the Mourned Nicholas Zrínyi, essays on literary and cultural history), Argumentum, Budapest, 1999
- The Life and Poetry of Miklós Radnóti, ed. with Clive Wilmer (essays by different hands) East European Monographs, Boulder, Co., 1999, distributed by Columbia University Press
- György Petri: Eternal Monday. New and Selected Poems, tr. with Clive Wilmer, Bloodaxe, Newcastle, 1999
- Jőjj el, szabadság...Irások a huszadik századi magyar költészetről (Come, Freedom! Essays on Twentieth-Century Hungarian Poetry), Nyelv és Lélek Könyvek, Anyanyelvi Konferencia, Budapest, 1999
- Váltott hangokon. Szerepversek és újabb versek (On Different Voices, Poems), Kortárs kiadó, Budapest, 2000
- Magnetic Poles, (essays on Polish and Comparative Literature), Polish Cultural Foundation, London, 2000
- Czeslaw Milosz: Ahogy elkészül a világ.Versek (Poems tr. into Hungarian by Cz.Milosz: How the World is Made, selected and translated), AB-ART, Bratislava, 2001
- Clive Wilmer: Végtelen változatok.Versek (Infinite Variations, Hungarian tr. of poems by C.Wilmer, with Anna T. Szabó), JATE Press, Szeged, 2002
- Miklós Radnóti, Forced March. Selected Poems, 2nd, extended ed., tr. with Clive Wilmer, Enitharmon Press, London, 2003
- A tél illata. Versek (The Fragrance of Winter. Poems), Ister, Budapest, 2003
- Dylemat królika doswiadczalnego.Wybór wierszy (The Guinea Pig's Dilemma.Poems tr. into Polish, tr. by Feliks Netz), Biblioteka Slaska, Katowice, 2003
- Erdélyi merítések. Tanulmányok és írások (Transylvanian Catches.Essays and Writings), Komp-Press, Ariadné, Cluj-Kolozsvár, 2004
- Magyarországi diákok angol és skót egyetemeken 1526–1789.Hungarian Students in England and Scotland 1526–1789, Egyetemi Könyvtár, Budapest, 2005 (Database: Magyar diákok egyetemjárása az újkorban, 14.)
- Versek Marinak – Poems for Mari, (bilingual selection of poems), PONT kiadó, Budapest, 2006
- Az én forradalmam. Emlékezések és írások az 1956-os forradalomról (My Revolution. Reminiscences and Writings about the 1956 Hungarian revolution), PONT kiadó, Budapest, 2006
- Ez, és nem más (Válogatott és ujabb versek)(This One and Noone Else, Poems selected by Tibor Zalán), Argumentum, Budapest, 2007
- Polishing October (New and Selected Poems), tr. Clive Wilmer and George Gömöri, Shoestring Press, 2008, 80 pp.
- A száműzetés kertje (Ujabb versek), with the photos of Kaiser Ottó, Komp-Press, Cluj-Napoca, 2009
- Kulturánk követei a régi Európában, Tanulmányok, Editio Princeps, Piliscsaba, 2009, 215 pp. and illustrations.
- Lapszéli jegyzetek Londonból (Marginal notes from London) Feuilletons, sketches, Irodalmi jelen, Arad, 2010, 119 pp.
- János Pilinszky: Passio, tr. with Clive Wilmer, Worple Press, Tonbridge, 2011, 20 pp.
- I lived on this earth... Hungarian Poets on the Holocaust, anthology ed. with Mari Gomori, foreword by Sir Martin Gilbert, Alba Press, London, 2012, 87 pp.
- Békássy Ferenc szerelmes levelei (Love Letters to Noel Olivier), ed. With Tibor Weiner Sennyey, tr. Virág Balogi, Aranymadár Books, Budapest, 2013, 166 pp.
- Wiktor Woroszylski: A határ átlépése (Crossing the Border. Selected Poems and Prose) Tr. and ed. György Gömöri, Irodalmi jelen, Arad, 2013, 195 pp.
- The Polish Swan Triumphant. Essays from Kochanowski to Norwid, Cambridge Scholars, Newcastle u. Tyne, 2013, 159 pp.
- Polishing October. New and Selected Poems. Shoestring Press, Nottingham, 2013, tr. mostly with Clive Wilmer, 90 pp.
- Rózsalovaglás (Riding with Roses), Pro Pannonia Publishers, 2014.
- A rejtőzködő Balassi, Komp-Press, 2014.
- The Alien in the Chapel: Ferenc Békássy, Rupert Brooke's Unknown Rival co-edited with Mari Gömöri, 2016, 256 pp.,
- Magyar-lengyel változatok, (Hungarian-Polish variations, essays), Pro Pannonia, Pécs, 2016
- Az ajtó monológja (Monologue of A Door), poems, Orpheusz, Budapest, 2017
- Erdélyi arcok (Selection of poems on Transylvania), Bookart, Csíkszereda-Miercurea Ciuc, Romania, 2018 (with illustrations from the portfolio of Győző Somogyi)
- Polski redaktor i węgierski polonista, Korespondencja Jerzego Giedroycia i Györgya (George'a) Gömöriego, 1958–2000, ed.Gábor Lagzi, Neriton, Warsaw, 2018
- Steep Path, Poems translated from the Hungarian by Clive Wilmer and George Gömöri, Selected by Clive Wilmer, Corvina, Budapest, 2018
- Magyar 'apostol' Angliában, essays on Ferenc Békássy, Savaria, 2020.
- What he may seem to the world: Isaac Newton's autograph book epigrams, co-authored by Stephen D. Snobelen of University of King's College, Halifax, Notes and Records Vol.74, Royal Society, Issue 3, p409-452, September 2020
- Elvándorlók és elvágyódók. Esszék, tanulmányok. (Those who left and those who longed to leave), Savaria University Press, Szombathely, 2021
- Alkonyi séta (Walk at Twilight), poems, Parnasszus kiadó, Budapest, 2022
- Magyar vándorok Angliában 1572-1750 (Hungarians peregrinating in England), Savaria University Press, 2023
- Moi polscy pisarze i poeci (My Polish Writers and Poets, Essays), Księgarnia Akademicka, Cracow, 2023
- Norwidtól Herbertig (From Norwid to Herbert): essays on Polish literature, Savaria University Press, 2024
- Soknyelvű életem (My Multilingual Life), Savaria University Press, 2024
- Kötetlen szabadság (Unrestricted Freedom), Alba Press, 2025
