= Loula Anagnostaki =

- Λούλα Αναγνωστάκη
- Born: 13 December 1928; Thessaloniki, Greece
- Died: 8 October 2017 (aged 88)
- Education: Aristotle University of Thessaloniki
- Relatives: Manolis Anagnostakis (brother)

Loula Anagnostaki (13 December 1928 – 8 October 2017) was a Greek writer. Her surname also appears as Anagnostakē.

== Biography ==
She was born in Thessaloniki. She was the sister of poet Manolis Anagnostakis. She earned a law degree from Aristotle University of Thessaloniki.

Her first three one act plays were performed in 1965 and published in 1974: Dianyktereusē (Overnight stop), Polé (The City) and Parelasé (Parade). Her works have been performed by the National Theatre of Greece and by Karolos Koun's Art Theatre, as well as in Cyprus, France, England, Italy and Poland.

== Selected works ==
- E Synanastrophē (Social encounter), play (1967)
- Antonio ē to menyma (Antonio or the message), play (1972)
- Nikē (Victory), play (1978)
- E Kaseta (The tape), play (1983), published by «Κέδρος», Αθήνα 2008, ISBN 978-960-04-3859-8
- O Ihos Tou Oplou (The sound of the gun), play (1986), published by «Κέδρος», Αθήνα 2007, ISBN 978-960-04-3653-2
- Διαμάντια και μπλουζ. Το ταξίδι μακριά.(Diamonds and Blues. The long journey.) plays published by «Κέδρος», Αθήνα 2008, ISBN 978-960-04-3697-6
