= Two Rivers Press =

- Founded: 1994
- Founder: Peter Hay
- Country of origin: United Kingdom
- Headquarters location: Reading
- Publication types: Books
- Official website: http://tworiverspress.com/

Two Rivers Press is an independent publishing house, based in the English town of Reading. Two Rivers Press was founded in 1994 by Peter Hay (1951–2003), a local artist. Its name reflects his enthusiasm for the town and its two rivers, the Kennet and the Thames, and its intention to explore the place where art and history meet. The name also gives a clue to the origins of the company in the, ultimately successful, opposition to Reading's proposed Cross-Town Route, a road scheme that would have seriously impacted the point at which the two rivers meet.

To date, the company has published over 70 titles. A significant part of its work explores and celebrates local history. It also publishes new editions of classic poems, especially ones with some Reading connection, such as Oscar Wilde's The Ballad of Reading Gaol, and collections of contemporary poetry from resident poets.

Today the company is managed by Sally Mortimer, assisted by Adam Sowan, as local history editor, and Peter Robinson, who combines his role of poetry editor with that of Professor of English and American literature at the University of Reading.
