= Zsennye =

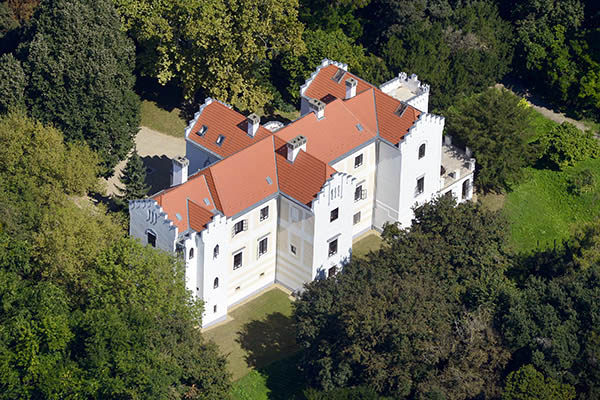
- Aerial photograph of Zsennye Castle

- Location of Vas county in Hungary

- Location of Zsennye
- Coordinates: 47.11319°N 16.81688°E
- Country: Hungary
- County: Vas

Area
  - Total: 5.02 km^{2} (1.94 sq mi)

Population (2004)
  - Total: 102
  - Density: 20.31/km^{2} (52.6/sq mi)
- Time zone: UTC+1 (CET)
  - Summer (DST): UTC+2 (CEST)
- Postal code: 9766
- Area code: 94

Zsennye is a village in Vas county, Hungary.

== Origin of the name ==
Zsennye comes from the old Hungarian Synnie name, which in turn originates from the name Semjén (Simon).
