= Cambridge Poetry Festival =

Literary festival in Cambridge, England

Coordinates: 52.20°N 0.12°E

The Cambridge Poetry Festival, founded by Richard Berengarten (also known as Richard Burns), was an international biennale for poetry held in Cambridge, England, between 1975–1985. The festival was founded in an attempt to combine as many aspects as possible of this form of art. The last biennale in 1985 included a number of events to mark Ezra Pound's centenary, including the exhibition Pound's Artists: Ezra Pound and the Visual Arts in London, Paris and Italy at Kettle's Yard (later also shown at the Tate Gallery) and was accompanied by a special issue of the magazine PN Review. The festival is planned to be revived in 2026.

== History ==
The Cambridge Poetry Festival was founded by British poet Richard Berengarten in 1975. It was an international biennale for poetry, held in Cambridge, between 1975 and 1985. It was funded first by the Arts Council, who provided about half of the budget, and then from 1977 by the Eastern Arts Association. Writing thirty-five years later, Berengarten said that his aims in setting up the festival were for it to be 'diverse, innovative and international'.

The festival was founded in an attempt to combine as many aspects as possible of this form of art. Thus Michael Hamburger could, for example, recite his English interpretations of Paul Celan's poetry in the presence of Gisèle Lestrange and a surprisingly large audience at an art gallery bestowed on her engravings. The sixth and last biennale in 1985 included a number of events to mark Ezra Pound's centenary, including the exhibition Pound's Artists: Ezra Pound and the Visual Arts in London, Paris and Italy at Kettle's Yard (later also shown at the Tate Gallery) and was accompanied by a special issue of the magazine PN Review. Twenty-four poets were involved in the 1985 event.

The festival will be revived in 2026, a year after its 50th anniversary.

== Literature ==
- Richard Berengarten, "The Cambridge Poetry Festival: 35 years after", Cambridge Literary Review, I/1 (Michaelmas, 2009)
- Martin Booth: British poetry 1964 to 1984: driving through the barricades (Routledge, 1985).
- Rolf Dieter Brinkmann: The Last One: Readings / Autorenlesungen, Cambridge Poetry Festival 1975 [Audio-book] [CD], 59 min. (Intermedium Records, 2005)
