= Carcanet Press =

British publisher

- Founded: 1969; 57 years ago
- Country of origin: United Kingdom
- Headquarters location: Manchester, England
- Distribution: NBN International (UK); Independent Publishers Group (US); Sula Books (South Africa)
- Key people: Michael Schmidt
- Publication types: Books
- Official website: www.carcanet.co.uk

Carcanet Press is a publisher, primarily of poetry, based in the United Kingdom. Originally a student magazine devised by undergraduates collaborating between Oxford and Cambridge, it was refounded in 1969 by Michael Schmidt.

In 2000 it was named the Sunday Times millennium Small Publisher of the Year.

== History ==
Carcanet was originally a literary magazine; it was founded in 1962 by students from the Universities of Oxford and Cambridge. Michael Hind, a member of the original editorial board, recalls how the idea was to "collect together and publish as a periodical poetry, short fiction, and 'intelligent criticism of all the arts'; there were to be both student and senior members' contributions." The intention was to link Oxford and Cambridge universities. Its name is an English word which means "a collar of jewels", diminutive of "carcan" (an obsolete word for a collar used for punishment), pronounced "kar'ka-net". (A much earlier use of the word was in The Carcanet, an anthology published in 1828.)

The magazine Carcanet had fallen on hard times by October 1967 when Michael Schmidt, a newly arrived undergraduate at Wadham College, Oxford, took it over. In 1969 as a swansong the magazine produced a few pamphlets: poetry by new writers from Britain, India and the United States, and a book of translations. The reviews were encouraging, and in 1970–71 Carcanet Press became a limited company, leaving South Hinksey, Oxford, for Manchester.

Carcanet is an Arts Council England National Portfolio Organisation. Its list includes, alongside new writers from all over the world, major authors from the twentieth and earlier centuries.

== Location ==
Carcanet was conceived at Pin Farm, South Hinksey, Oxford, in 1969 by Peter Jones, Gareth Reeves and Michael Schmidt, and Grevel Lindop was instrumental in suggesting the Fyfield Books series. In 1971, when Michael Schmidt was appointed Gulbenkian Writing Fellow at the University of Manchester, Carcanet moved to 266 Councillor Lane, Cheadle Hulme, Cheshire, and in 1975 it came of age, taking a tiny suite of offices in the Corn Exchange, Manchester. However, the 1996 Manchester bombing impacted heavily on the workings of Carcanet Press, forcing it to move to temporary offices in Manchester House, Princess Street, and then across the river Irwell to Blackfriars Street, Salford, where it stayed for six years before moving back into the centre of Manchester. It now resides in Cross Street.

== Imprints, series, magazine ==
Besides the main poetry list and its range of inventive fiction and criticism, Carcanet is also home to several imprints and series:

=== Imprints ===
- Aspects of Portugal
- Carcarnet Classics
- Carcanet Fiction
- Lives and Letters
- Oxford Poets - established in March 1999 as the poetry list of Oxford University Press

=== Series ===
- Fyfield Books (AKA Fyfield Poetry)
- Robert Graves Programme

=== Magazine ===
Carcanet issues the literary magazine PN Review, which appears six times a year.

== See also ==
- David C. Ward
- Michael Schmidt
- Sally Purcell, British poet who was the first female author to appear in Carcanet
- Rima Alamuddin, Lebanese-Swiss poet who featured in Carcanet's second edition and whose works were posthumously published by Carcanet
