= Manolis Anagnostakis =

Greek poet and critic

Manolis Anagnostakis (Greek: Μανόλης Αναγνωστάκης; 10 March 1925 – 23 June 2005) was a Greek poet and critic at the forefront of the Marxist and existentialist poetry movements arising during and after the Greek Civil War in the late 1940s. Anagnostakis was a leader amongst his contemporaries and influenced the generation of poets immediately after him. His poems have been honored in Greece's national awards and arranged and sung by contemporary musicians. In spite of his accomplishments, Philip Ramp notes that Anagnostakis "is the least known, to an English speaking audience, of the major Greek poets of his generation."

== Life ==
Anagnostakis was born in Thessaloniki and trained as a doctor, specializing in radiology. During the chaotic period of 1944, Anagnostakis served as the Editor-in-Chief of Xekinima (The Start), a student magazine. Anagnostakis' first book of poetry, Epoches (Seasons) was published in 1945, at which point, according to Ramp, the poet's Marxist "dream had already failed him".^{[1]} His left-wing sympathies had inspired him to join the Resistance, which would lead to his being sentenced to death by a military court during the Civil War. Arrested for his involvement with the Student Movement at the University of Thessaloniki in 1948, Anagnostakis spent several years in Heptapyrgion, a state prison. His second volume, Epoches 2 was published after he was imprisoned in 1948. In the next year, Anagnostakis was both expelled from the Communist Party of Greece and tried in court. He received a death sentence, but outsurvived the regime. Upon his release in 1951, he published the last book in the cycle.

Anagnostakis began a new cycle of work with his Synecheia (The Continuation), in 1954, and its sequel in 1955. A collection of his works was published the next year. The poet spent 1955 and the next year in Vienna, continuing his medical studies in radiology, before returning to Greece. He spent 1959 through 1961 as editor of Criticism, a journal of literary criticism, and finished his Continuation cycle in 1962. While he did not publish any more major works until 1971's Ta piimata 1941–1971, (The Poems 1941–1971), he continued to contribute to newspapers and magazines.

Although Anagnostakis' 1971 collection represented the end of the published works he was best known for, his existentialism-influenced verse left its mark on a younger generation of Greek poets. This influence is in part owing to his poetry having been set to music by Mikis Theodorakis, as part of his Ballades cycle, written during the seven-year Regime of the Colonels. The Ballades have been performed by vocalist Margarita Zorbala (recorded on her 1975 debut album), amongst others. Anagnostakis moved his practice and family to Athens in 1978. Lakis Papastathis produced a 52-minute film, Manolis Anagnostakis, on Anagnostakis' life, for the Greek television series Paraskenio in 1983. Two volumes of Anagnostakis', another collection and O piitis Manussos Fassis, (The Poet Manussos Fassis) were issued in the following four years. Anagnostakis died in 2005 in Athens.

== Poetry ==
Anagnostakis' poetry has been described as "terse". His early works may be comparable in number of lines to Cavafy, but do contain single-word lines and single-line verse paragraphs. Other characteristics of the early poems are its "bold, conversational tone", sometimes in the form of an epistle, and at others culminating in direct advice to the reader. This style, along with Anagnostakis' simple, direct description of a hostile world was emulated by other left-wing poets of his generation.

Beaton also notes "a deep distrust of the poet's very medium, which runs through almost all the poetry of his generation",^{[6]} as, for instance, in the poem "Now He Is A Simple Spectator". Also unusual amongst those contemporary poets sharing Anagnostakis' politics is Anagnostakis' use of Christian imagery in his poetry, and, unusual amongst Greek poets in general is a lack of romanticizing of the sea.^{[1]}

In the Synecheia series, written between the Civil War and the Regime of the Colonels, Vangelis Hadjivassiliou notes that Anagnostakis extends that ambivalence to his politics, as well. Anagnostakis asserts both that "...the War is not over yet./ For no war is ever over!" and that he is "Laughing at your wealth of armours/ Suddenly infiltrating your lines/ Upsetting the solid arrays".^{[2]}

The O stochos poems were written during the Regime of the Colonels. This work contains poems differing from the above characterizations of Anagnostakis as "ambivalent" and "grim".^{[4]} The book contains both a defense of poetry ("Poetics"), and a sardonic response to Cavafy's "Young Men of Sidon (A.D. 400)", titled "Young Men of Sidon, 1970", which defends levity against the demand for seriousness from Cavafy's "vivacious young man". Ekdotike Athenon S.A. cites the work as exemplary of Greek poetry after the Second World War, describing it as "[representing] the social questioning typical of the poetry of the post-war generation".

The post-1971 poems were, in some cases, even more terse than the Epoches poems, often being only epigrams. Categorizing Anagnostakis' poetry into a movement has proven somewhat challenging for critics. Hadjivassiliou characterizes the period of the Continuations as "wholly political".^{[2]} Nassos Vagenas, on the other hand, divides post-war Greek poetry into Marxist, existentialist, and surrealist, and then places Anagnostakis in the existentialist movement. Ramp suggests that the poet's lack of recognition outside of Greece can be attributed to the fact that Anagnostakis' poetry is politically "committed",^{[1]} but agrees that the poetry is not influenced by surrealism.

== Awards ==
- 1985 Greek State Prize for poetry
- 2001 Ourani Award from the Academy of Athens
- 2002 Great National Literature Award for lifetime work

== Works ==
- 1945: Epoches (Seasons), Thessaloniki.
- 1948: Epoches 2 (Seasons 2), Serres.
- 1951: Epoches 3 (Seasons 3), Thessaloniki.
- 1954: Synecheia (The Continuation), Athens.
- 1955: Synecheia 2 (The Continuation 2), Athens.
- 1956: Ta piimata 1941–1956 (The Poems 1941–1956), Athens.
- 1962: Synecheia 3 (The Continuation 3), Thessaloniki.
- 1965: Yper Kai Kata (Pros and Cons), Thessaloniki.
- 1971: O stochos, Athens. English edition, 1980: The target. Selected poems, translated by Kimon Friar
- 1971: Ta piimata 1941–1971, (The Poems 1941–1971), Athens, Stigmi, 1985.
- 1972: Paréntheseis (Parentheses), Athens.
- 1978: Anti-Dogmatica (Anti-dogmatic pieces), Athens.
- 1979: To Perithorio (The Margin), Athens.
- 1983: Y.G. (P.S.), Athens.
- 1985: Ta Sympleromatika (The Complementary Pieces: Critical Notes), Athens.
- 1987: O piitis Manussos Fassis, (The Poet Manussos Fassis), Athens, Stigmi, 1987.

== Notes and references ==
1. ^{a} ^{b} ^{c} Ramp, Philip (1998). "Translator's Note". In Ramp, Philip (trans.) (ed.). Poems. Shoestring Press. pp. 5–6. ISBN 1-899549-19-6.
2. ^{a} ^{b} "The Deafening Sound of Silence". Archived from the original on October 27, 2005.
3. "The Greek film festival 2000 (Greek)". Archived from the original on September 27, 2007.
4. ^{a} "Manolis Anagnostakis". Archived from the original on October 28, 2005.
5. See "Winter 1942" as an example. Translation into English by Philip Ramp at "Winter 1942". Archived from the original on October 27, 2005.
6. ^{a} Roderick Beaton, quoted in "Poetry International". Archived from the original on October 28, 2005.
7. See "The Morning..." as an example. Translation into English by Philip Ramp at "Winter 1942". Archived from the original on October 27, 2005.
8. This has been remarked upon in G. Agapetos' Kokoles, X. A. (1999). "The Poetic Christology of Manolis Anagnostakis" (PDF). Journal of Modern Greek Studies. 17: 125–150. doi:10.1353/mgs.1999.0020. S2CID 146577389. and in "Athens News: Easter(n) rites' lament and jubilation". Archived from the original on April 19, 2004.
9. Unattributed translation from "Ithaka: A Tribute to Constantine P. Cavafy".
10. "Literature after the second World War".
11. Nasos Vagenas (2004). "Manolis Anagnostakis, existential poet". Archived from the original on 2016-11-23.
