= Vittorio Sereni =

Italian poet, author, editor and translator (1913–1983)

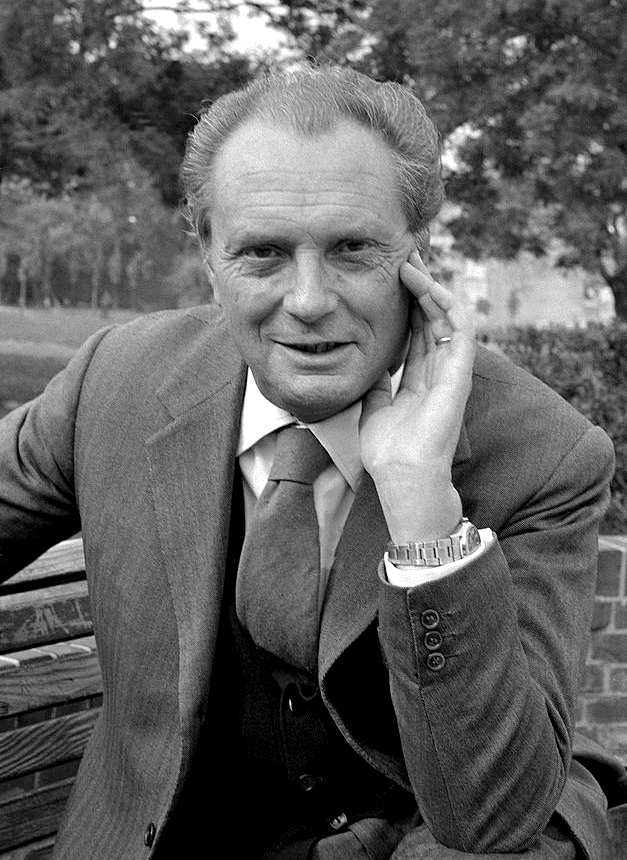
Vittorio Sereni in Milan in 1975

Vittorio Sereni (27 July 1913 – 10 February 1983) was an Italian poet, author, editor and translator. His poetry frequently addressed the themes of 20th-century Italian history, such as Fascism, Italy's military defeat in World War II, and its postwar resurgence.

Born at Luino, Sereni graduated from the University of Milan in 1936. In 1938, he co-founded the literary review Corrente di Vita. In 1941, he published Frontiera, his first collection of poetry. He was drafted into the Italian Army during World War II: captured by Allied forces in 1943, he spent the rest of the war in POW camps in Algeria and Morocco. These experiences formed the basis for his second poetry book, Diario d'Algeria.

After the war, Sereni worked as a teacher and literary critic. From the mid-1950s until his retirement in 1976, he was literary director of the Arnoldo Mondadori Editore publishing house. His later collections of poetry included Gli strumenti umani (1965) and Stella variabile (1981). He was a prolific translator, rendering into Italian the works of Pierre Corneille, Paul Valéry and William Carlos Williams, among others. His collection of translated poems, Il musicante di Saint-Merry, was awarded the 1982 Bagutta Prize.

Sereni's works are collected in English in The Selected Poetry and Prose of Vittorio Sereni: A Bilingual Edition (2006), translated by Marcus Perryman and Peter Robinson.

== See also ==
- Corrente di Vita
