= Pound's Artists =

1985 exhibition to mark the centenary of Ezra Pound's birth

Pound's Artists: Ezra Pound and the Visual Arts in London, Paris and Italy was an exhibition held in 1985 to mark the centenary of Ezra Pound's birth.

== History ==
The exhibition was originally conceived by Clive Wilmer, and was shown at Kettle's Yard from 14 June to 4 August 1985 to coincide with the 1985 Cambridge Poetry Festival, and at the Tate Gallery from 11 September to 10 November 1985.

The exhibition team at the Tate was headed by Richard Humphreys, and at Kettle's Yard by Hilary Gresty and Andrew Nairne.

== Contents ==
A volume of essays by Richard Humphreys, John Alexander and Peter Robinson, and edited by Richard Humphreys, was published by the Tate Gallery to accompany the exhibition.

== Tate Gallery Symposium ==
To accompany the exhibition, on 19 October 1985, the Tate Gallery held an Ezra Pound Symposium to examine the connections between Ezra Pound and the visual arts. The speakers were Ian Bell, Judy Collins, Paul Edwards, Patricia Hutchins, Lionel Kelly, Anthony Ozturk, Alan Robinson, Mike Weaver, Clive Wilmer and Harriet Zinnes.
