= Michael Schmidt (poet) =

British poet (born 1947)

Michael Schmidt OBE, FRSL
- Born: 2 March 1947 (age 79); Mexico City, Mexico
- Education: Harvard University; Wadham College, Oxford
- Occupations: Poet, author, scholar and publisher
- Known for: Founder of Carcanet Press and of PN Review
- Website: www.michaelschmidt.org.uk

Michael Schmidt OBE FRSL (born 2 March 1947) is a Mexican-British poet, author, scholar and publisher.

== Early life ==
Schmidt was born in Mexico City, Mexico, on 2 March 1947. He was educated at The Hill School from 1959 to 1965 and earned an English-Speaking Union Scholarship to attend Christ's Hospital School (1965–66). He studied at Harvard University and at Wadham College, Oxford University, subsequently settling in England.

== Career ==
Schmidt was Professor of Poetry at Glasgow University until 2014, Writer-in-Residence at St. John's College, Cambridge, from 2012 to 2015 and a visiting fellow at Trinity College, Cambridge, from 2017 to 2018. He is founder (1969) and editorial and managing director of Carcanet Press and a founder (1973) and general editor of PN Review.

A fellow of the Royal Society of Literature (elected in 1993), Schmidt was appointed an Officer of the Order of the British Empire (OBE) in 2006 for services to poetry. His literary career has been described as having "a strong sense of internationalism and cultural 'connectedness'". Schmidt refers to himself in his 1998 book Lives of the Poets as "an Anglophone Mexican publisher".

In 2006, Schmidt delivered the keynote address at the StAnza Poetry Festival, entitled "What, How Well, Why?: A leading poetry publisher wonders why criticism has got a bad name".

Schmidt's 2014 book, The Novel: A Biography, is a loosely chronological history of the development of the novel. The book aims to explore the relationships between great novelists, including views by other novelists, while avoiding literary critics who were not also writers. In August 2015, Schmidt was one of 20 authors of Poets for Corbyn, an anthology of poems endorsing Jeremy Corbyn's campaign in the Labour Party leadership election.

== Selected bibliography ==
=== Poetry ===
- It Was My Tree (Anvil, 1970)
- Bedlam and the Oak Wood (Carcanet, 1970)
- Desert of the Lions (Carcanet, 1972)
- My Brother Gloucester (Carcanet, 1976)
- A Change of Affairs (Anvil, 1978)
- The Love of Strangers – Poetry Book Society Special Commendation (Century Hutchinson, 1989)
- Selected Poems, 1972-1997 – Poetry Book Society Special Commendation (Smith/Doorstop, 1997)
- The Resurrection of the Body (USA: Sheep Meadow; Smith/Doorstop, 2007)
- Collected Poems (Smith/Doorstop, 2009, Sheep Meadow Press, 2010)
- The Stories of My Life (Smith/Doorstop 2013)

=== Fiction ===
- The Colonist – Los Angeles Times book award (Muller/Hutchinson, 1983; published in USA as Green Island, Vanguard, 1984, Dell, 1985)
- The Dresden Gate (Century Hutchinson, 1988; Vanguard, 1989)

=== Criticism ===
- Reading Modern Poetry (London: Routledge, 1989), ISBN 0-415-01568-5
- Lives of the Poets (Phoenix, 1998), ISBN 978-0-7538-0745-3
- The Story of Poetry: From Cædmon to Caxton; From Skelton to Dryden; From Pope to Burns (three volumes) (2001–2006)
- The First Poets: Lives of the Ancient Greek Poets (2004)
- The Novel: A Biography (Cambridge, MA: Belknap Press, 2014)
- Gilgamesh: The Life of a Poem (Princeton, NJ: Princeton University Press, 2019)

=== Anthologies ===
- New Poetries I-VIII (Carcanet, 1994–2018)
- Eleven British Poets (Methuen, 1980)
- The Harvill Book of Twentieth-Century Poetry in English (1999, 2005) (editor)
- A Calendar of Modern Poetry (PN Review 100, 1994)
- The Great Modern Poets (including audio excerpts), Quercus Poetry, 2006, ISBN 9780857382467
