= Nasos Vagenas =

Greek poet (born 1945)

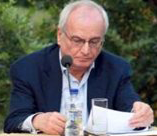
Vagenas in 2011

Nasos Vagenas, also transliterated Vayenas (Greek: Νάσος Βαγενάς; born 8 March 1945, Drama, Greece) is a Greek poet and translator.

Vagenas studied philology at the University of Athens. He has taught at the universities of Athens (1963–1968), Rome (1970–1972), Essex (1972–1973) and Cambridge (1974–1978), where he wrote his doctorate thesis on the poetry of George Seferis.

== Works ==
=== Poetry ===
- Πεδίον Αρεως (1974)
- Βιογραφία (1978)
- Τα γόντα της Ρωξάνης (1981)
- Βάρβαρες Ωδές (1992
- Η πτώση του ιπτάμενου β' (1997)
- Σκοτεινές μπαλλάντες και άλλα ποιήματα (2001)

=== Essays ===
- Η συντεχία (1976)
- Ο ποιητής και ο χορευτής (1979)
- Ο λαβύρινθος της σιωπής (1982)
- Η Εσθήτα της Θεάς (1988)
- Η ειρωνική γλώσσα (1994)
- Σημειώσεις από το τέλος του αιώνα (1999)

== Translations of his poetry ==
=== In English ===
- Βiography, translated by Richard Berengarten. Cambridge: Lobby Press, 1978.
- Biography and Other Poems, translated by John Stathatos. London: Oxus Press, 1979.

=== In German ===
- Wanderung eines Nicht-Reisenden, translated by Alexandra Rassidakis. Cologne: Romiosini, 1997.

=== In Italian ===
- Vagabondaggi di un non viaggiatore, translated by Caterina Carpinato. Milan: Crocetti, 1997.

=== In Dutch ===
- Biografie en andere gedichten, translated by Marko Fondse and Hero Hokwerda. Amsterdam: Het Griekse Eiland, 1990.
- Barbaarse Oden, translated by Marko Fondse and Hero Hokwerda. Groningen: Styx Publications, 1997.

=== In Romanian ===
- Rătăcirile unui necălător, translated by Victor Ivanovici. Bucharest: Seara, 1998.
- Ode Barbare, translated by Valeriu Mardare. Bucharest: Omonia, 2001.

=== In Serbian ===
- Варварске оде. Песме и есеји, translated by Ivan Gadjanski and Ksenija Maricki Gadjanski. Belgrade: Rad, 2001.
