= P. N. Review =

Periodic publication in the United Kingdom

- Frequency: 6 per year
- Founder: Michael Schmidt and Brian Cox
- Founded: 1973; 53 years ago
- Country: United Kingdom
- Language: English
- Website: www.pnreview.co.uk
- ISSN: 0144-7076
- OCLC: 6000393

P. N. Review is a periodic publication in the United Kingdom, on the subject of poetry. Each issue includes an editorial, letters, news and notes, articles, interviews, features, poems, translations, and a substantial book review section. It is indexed by the Modern Language Association.

In 1973, P. N. Review launched as a twice-yearly hardback under the title Poetry Nation, founded by Michael Schmidt and Professor Brian Cox at the Victoria University of Manchester. It began being published quarterly in 1976 as an A4 paperback. At this time, the title changed to P. N. Review, and Cox and Schmidt were joined on the editorial board by Professor Donald Davie and C. H. Sisson. Brian Cox retired, followed some years later by Donald Davie and C. H. Sisson. Since 1981, it has been published six times per year. Two hundred and twenty-five issues of the magazine appeared as of the September–October 2015 number.
