= An Academic Question =

Novel by Barbara Pym

- First edition
- Author: Barbara Pym
- Language: English
- Genre: Comedy
- Publisher: Macmillan
- Publication date: 1986 (1st edition)
- Publication place: United Kingdom
- Media type: Print (hardbound)
- Pages: 190 (1st edition)

An Academic Question is the title given an unfinished novel by Barbara Pym, written in the early 1970s. A reconstructed version was published posthumously in 1986.

== Synopsis ==
Caroline 'Caro' Grimstone is married to a sociology lecturer in a small West Country red brick university at the start of the 1970s. While her husband, Dr Alan Grimstone, is fascinated by dinner party discussions of African anthropology and minor academic points, Caro is growing tired of the dull town and her pale marriage and feels unfulfilled by her position as the mother of their 4-year-old daughter Kate. For something to do, she undertakes voluntary work at a nursing home, reading to an elderly and nearly blind retired missionary, the Reverend Mr Stillingfleet. Alan realises that Stillingfleet possesses an unpublished manuscript in their shared field of anthropology. Concerned that the manuscript will be lost – or, worse, bequeathed to a rival – Alan accompanies his wife on one of her visits to read to Stillingfleet and steals the manuscript, which allows him to write a ground-breaking paper that will further his academic ambitions.

Following Stillingfleet's death soon afterwards, Caro begins to regret the theft. She also suspects that Alan is having an affair with an apparently divorced colleague, Iris Horniblow. She seeks the guidance of her friends Kitty Jeffreys, a self-absorbed English woman who has spent much of her adult life in the Caribbean, Kitty's sexually and racially indeterminate son Coco, and Kitty's sister Dolly, a spinster who cares for a large family of hedgehogs in her back garden. Though none of this proves helpful, Alan eventually admits that he has had a fling with Cressida, the assistant editor of the journal that is publishing his article.

Outraged at first, Caro goes to stay with her mother, then with her sister Susan, living in a seedy part of London. While there she goes to see Cressida, intending to have a showdown, but finds her in a state of hopeless disorganisation, "a jolly friendly girl who would go to bed with anyone and think nothing of it". Realising she has made too much of the incident, Caro returns home to the warm welcome of her flustered husband and their marriage resumes its course. She offers to help in the university library, where 'the Stillingfleet collection' of papers has been rehoused in a cupboard. But no sooner has the manuscript which has caused so much chaos been returned clandestinely than it is destroyed in a fire started accidentally by (mildly) protesting students on Guy Fawkes Night. Now Crispin Maynard, Alan's recently retired professor, who has been threatening to consult the papers in order to refute his colleague, can no longer turn the academic question into a field of contention.

== Background and publication history ==
The character Coco Jeffreys was modelled on Pym's close friend Richard Roberts, a young antiques dealer from the Bahamas whom she had met in 1963, and whose mother Lady Roberts still lived in Nassau but is transported to England as Kitty Jeffreys in the novel.

Pym commenced writing the novel in 1970 and completed the first draft in 1971. Her last novel had been published in 1961 and she had been rejected by publishers since then. At the time, Pym had no expectations for her "academic novel", writing "[p]erhaps my immediate circle of friends will like to read it". She intended the novel to be "a sort of Margaret Drabble effort", but it turned out very different and she was ultimately dissatisfied with it.

Pym left two drafts of An Academic Question, one as a first-person narrative and one in the third person. After Pym's death, her sister Hilary and her literary executor Hazel Holt revised the work for publication from a combination of her notes and the two drafts. The novel was published posthumously in 1986, by Macmillan in England and E. P. Dutton in the United States. There have also been translations in French as Une Question Purement Académique (Julliard, 1990), in German as Die Frau des Professors (The Professor's Wife, Piper, 1991), and in Italian as Una questione accademica (Astoria, 2019).

It was Hazel Holt who chose the title from a phrase in one of the novel's final chapters. Its immediate inspiration was a wrangle in Africa, the academic journal of the International African Institute that Pym was editing at the time of writing.

== Reception ==
The novel received mixed reviews, with most acknowledging its status as a draft. Kirkus Reviews called it "minor but still intriguing... on occasion, deliriously funny", though the New York Times called it "one of Pym's paler efforts". However, John Bayley, writing for the London Review of Books, considered it "as readable and characteristic as any in the Pym canon…The spontaneity of the humour is fundamental to this novelist's unique marriage of art and life."

== Connections to other works ==
Pym's novels routinely feature characters from her previous works. The characters of Sister Dew from An Unsuitable Attachment and Digby Fox from Less than Angels reappear. But most notably, this novel features the memorial service for Esther Clovis, a character who had appeared in three previous Pym novels, starting with Excellent Women. Here the memorial service is seen from the point of view of Caro, who did not know Miss Clovis and thus is attempting to piece together the woman's personality from the details of her service. The service will be seen a second time, from a different perspective, in the final novel that Pym wrote, A Few Green Leaves.

It has further been noted that Caro and Alan are among the comparatively scarce married central characters in Pym's fiction. The other exceptions are Adam and Cassandra Marsh-Gibbon in Civil to Strangers and Rodney and Wilmet Forsyth in A Glass of Blessings. In addition there are the unmarried Prudence Bates' older friends, Nicholas and Jane Cleveland in Jane and Prudence, in which their difference in status is contrasted.

Kate Saunders, introducing the 2012 reedition of the novel, points out that Pym even includes herself and her sister Hillary in its course: "Two women who had retired from jobs in London came to lunch. They were rather nice spinster sisters…They must have loved in their time, perhaps loved and lost and come through it unscathed", which was how Pym viewed herself at the time.
