= A Few Green Leaves =

1980 novel by Barbara Pym

- First edition
- Author: Barbara Pym
- Language: English
- Publisher: Macmillan
- Publication date: 1980 (1st edition)
- Publication place: United Kingdom
- Media type: Print (hardbound)
- Pages: 224 (1st edition)

A Few Green Leaves is the final novel by Barbara Pym, first published in 1980, the year of Pym's death. Although several novels written before her rediscovery were published posthumously, A Few Green Leaves was the last she wrote.

== Synopsis ==
In the mid-1970s, anthropologist Emma Howick comes to live in a cottage belonging to her mother in an Oxfordshire village, planning to write up her study of new towns. But she turns her anthropologist's eye on the villagers, considering them as subjects for another paper. They include the rector Tom, his elder sister Daphne who came to 'make a home' for him after the death of his wife, two doctors (a generation apart in age and attitudes) and their wives, a food critic, a bohemian academic couple and a number of spinsters. Emma ponders whether she could adjust permanently to village life, and notes the changes that time has wrought on local customs. Among them are the decline of the manor house, which was once the site of regular gatherings for locals, but is now off limits except on a few occasions. As in many of Pym's novels, the Anglican Church plays a key role, although few people now attend the church.

Emma is single, to the disquiet of her mother and others, who seem to see her career goals as incomplete without marriage. Emma faces two potential love matches. First, a former lover, Graham Pettifer – also an academic – rents a cottage near the village to complete a book he is working on, and Emma is drawn back into his life, even though she is not sure how she feels about him and even finds him rather boring. She meets his estranged wife, the glamorous Claudia. Second, Tom's sister moves away, leaving him with only a rather unsatisfactory daily woman as domestic help. He begins to view Emma as a romantic partner. At the end of the book, Emma chooses to remain in the village, write a novel, and pursue a relationship with Tom. Although much has declined in village life, Emma decides to step away from her objective scientific view of the community and join it.

== Publication history ==
Pym had worked and lived in London since 1946, but in 1971 she moved with her sister Hilary to a cottage in the Oxfordshire countryside, and lived there permanently after her retirement in 1974 from her professional career as an editor and assistant on an academic journal. Since moving to Finstock, Pym had wanted to write another novel set in a village, as some of her early novels had been. She was especially interested in the way that village life had changed since she began writing her first novel in 1936. As was her custom, Pym kept detailed notebooks on her observations of daily life, and had started making the notes that would form the book at least as early as 1976. Pym wryly commented that the new novel might be a let-down after her more pointed social commentaries, "a dull village novel with no bi- or homosexuality"; some of Pym's other novels had featured homosexual (A Glass of Blessings) or bisexual (The Sweet Dove Died) characters.

Pym considered several possible titles for the novel, including Two Green Apricots, The Nectarine and the Cuckoo, Green Desert, Green Paradise and Dog's Mercury

Pym noted in a letter of 25 October 1978 that she was struggling to write the novel; however, by 14 February 1979 she had finished the first draft. Around that time, Pym was diagnosed with a malignant tumour, a return of the breast cancer she had overcome in 1971. She was told that she probably did not have long to live, which compelled Pym to attempt to complete the final copy of the novel. By August, she was still attempting to refine the novel but was beginning to feel the effects of chemotherapy and her degraded physical condition. Pym finished A Few Green Leaves in October 1979. She was not entirely happy with the quality of the final version, but no longer had the strength to keep writing. In Pym's initial draft of the novel, Emma's decision to stay in the village and pursue the love affair was present, but tentative; she made it more definite in the final draft.

Barbara Everett writes that, although in some senses the book can be seen as a "farewell", "its cogency comes from a strength and clarity that are more than simply private: and its writer was something more than a woman who has had a switchback life and is now dying of it."

Pym died on 11 January 1980. The novel was published the same year by Macmillan in Great Britain and E.P. Dutton in the United States. Pym's literary executor Hazel Holt helped finalise revisions after Pym's death. The novel was released as an audiobook in the 1980s by Chivers Press narrated by Jan Francis. The novel was published in Italy in 1994 as Qualche foglia verde and in France in 1987 as Un brin de verdure.

== Critical response ==
Reviews of A Few Green Leaves were more mixed than those of its immediate predecessors, Quartet in Autumn and The Sweet Dove Died, which had been successful. The New York Times regarded the novel as equal to anything Pym had previously written, and Penelope Fitzgerald – reviewing for the London Review of Books – found it to be the work of a "brilliant comic writer". However, Kirkus Reviews felt that the book was "minor Pym – really just a neutral-toned catchall of her acute angles on loneliness and the ravages of time-marching-on", but would appeal to her devoted fans.

Pym's long-time friend, the literary critic Robert Liddell, described the book and its sombre-but-hopeful tone as "Barbara's farewell to her readers".

Critics have examined the way in which Pym shows how "[m]odernity has crept into this more contemporary version of provincial life", including the changes in gender norms represented by the married couples in the book, the impact of modern technology, and the way in which the vicar's central role in village life in previous generations has largely been supplanted by doctors and self-sufficiency. Janice Rossen sees the novel as a final statement by Pym on life. "[It] is a novel about older, single people who live self-consciously and carefully, on occasion bravely. And so, it seems, did Pym." Nicholas Shrimpton, writing in the New Statesman, also saw the novel as a reflection on Pym's own relationship with the world.

== Connections to other works ==
Pym's novels regularly feature reappearances of characters from earlier novels. Here, Father Oswald Thames and Wilf Bason from A Glass of Blessings are mentioned, and Tom reads the death notice of Fabian Driver, one of the main characters in Jane and Prudence. The older doctor, "Doctor G.", is the brother of "Father G." from Quartet in Autumn. Most notably, Emma attends the memorial service of anthropological research assistant Esther Clovis. Esther appeared in three Pym novels, starting with Excellent Women, and her memorial service is also seen – from a different point of view – in the novel An Academic Question. Characters from Excellent Women and Less than Angels appear briefly at the memorial.

Pym considered having Letty and Marjorie, from Quartet in Autumn, come to live in the village in A Few Green Leaves.
