= No Fond Return of Love =

1961 novel by Barbara Pym

- First edition
- Author: Barbara Pym
- Language: English
- Publisher: Jonathan Cape
- Publication date: 1961
- Publication place: United Kingdom
- Media type: Print (Hardcover)
- Pages: 288 pp

No Fond Return of Love is a novel by Barbara Pym, first published in 1961.

== Plot summary ==
Dulcie Mainwaring, thirty two and recently jilted, works on 'the dustier fringes of the academic world', as a proofreader, indexer and occasional researcher. She attends a work conference and meets Viola Dace, who is engaged in similar pursuits but makes greater claims for her work as an academic and aspiring novelist. Viola knows one of the lecturers, the handsome Aylwin Forbes. He is separated from his wife, and it seems his dalliance with Viola was the final straw that led to their separation. While Viola seems keen to renew their connection, Aylwin assiduously avoids her. Dulcie too finds herself attracted to him.

Returned to London, Dulcie bumps into Viola, and they begin a kind of friendship. Dulcie's eighteen-year-old niece Laurel comes to live with her while she does a secretarial course. Viola also moves in, having had a difference with her landlady.

Meanwhile, Dulcie has learnt that Aylwin has a brother who is a clergyman. She sets out to find out more about both brothers. She goes to look at the house where Aylwin's wife Marjorie is living with her mother, Mrs Williton, and briefly meets both women. She visits an aunt and uncle, sister and brother, who live near Neville's church, then goes to the church, where she learns that there has been some 'trouble' involving the vicar and a woman.

Dulcie and Viola invite Aylwin to dinner, along with Dulcie's ex-fiancé Maurice. Laurel is present too; she is about to move to a bed-sitting room in the square Aylwin lives in. Maurice tries, unsuccessfully, to revive his relationship with Dulcie, and Aylwin is clearly taken with Laurel. He soon contrives to 'bump into' her, and invites her in for a drink. Aylwin's mother-in-law arrives as Laurel is leaving, and demands that he do something to resolve the situation with Marjorie.

Dulcie and Viola go to a service at Neville's church. Disappointingly, the man conducting the service is a locum: Neville has gone to stay with his mother, who runs a hotel in Taviscombe, Devon. On their way home, the women meet Bill, the brother of Dulcie's uncle and aunt's housekeeper. Bill and Viola take to each other.

Laurel sees more of Aylwin, as well as of a man near her own age.

Dulcie and Viola go to Taviscombe. After one night at a different hotel they arrange to move to Eagle House, encountering Neville for the first time. Mrs Williton and Marjorie too go to Eagle House. Aylwin follows them, resolved to have things out. One morning Dulcie goes into the lounge to find a book to read. Aylwin, Marjorie and Mrs Williton come in. They cannot see Dulcie, and she does not reveal herself. Aylwin says he will shortly furnish the evidence for a divorce, and leaves the room. Dulcie leaves without being seen. She walks to the sea, where she meets Aylwin. He indicates that he has become fond of Laurel, and hopes she cares for him. Dulcie is shocked.

Viola and Dulcie return to London. Viola gets engaged to Bill. Laurel tells her aunt that Aylwin has proposed to her (naturally, she declined), and that Marjorie has met someone else, on the train back from Taviscombe.

Neville encourages Dulcie to take a flat in his parish – the one recently vacated by the woman who had fallen in love with him.

Aylwin begins to think of Dulcie as a possible wife, and makes an excuse to visit her. He arrives with flowers . . .

== Publication history ==
No Fond Return of Love was Pym's sixth novel, published by Jonathan Cape in 1961. During the writing period, Pym noted that she wanted to write a novel about "the lives of ordinary people". The novel did not receive much critical notice, although it was reviewed positively in Tatler, where the reviewer wrote:

I love and admire Miss Pym's pussycat wit and profoundly unsoppy kindliness, and we may leave the deeply peculiar, face-saving, gently tormented English middle classes safely in her hands.

Pym's working title was A Thankless Task, in reference to the life of an indexer and assistant researcher. Pym shared the same profession as Viola and Dulcie, having worked at the International African Institute in London since 1946. The publishers felt the title was too negative, and so Pym chose the final title from a poem by eighteenth-century poet Frances Greville (which she altered from "no kind return of love").

The novel was first published in the United States by E. P. Dutton in 1982. No Fond Return of Love was released as an audiobook in the 1980s by Chivers Press read by Angela Pleasence and again in 2010 read by Maggie Mash. The novel was published in Spain as Amor no correspondido, and in Italy in 1991 as Per guarire un cuore infranto (To heal a broken heart) and again in 2014 as Amori non molto corrisposti (Unrequited love)

== Connections with other novels ==
Pym's novels usually feature reappearances by characters from her previous novels. Here, the characters of Wilmet and Rodney Forsyth, and Piers Longridge and his partner Keith, from A Glass of Blessings appear as tourists visiting the castle in Taviscombe. Rhoda Wellcome, from Less than Angels, appears briefly, and we learn that her niece Deirdre and her husband Digby Fox are expecting a child.

Pym inserts a reference to her own work. When Viola moves into Dulcie's house, she notes that among the books in the bathroom is Some Tame Gazelle, Pym's first published novel. The author would insert herself again in An Unsuitable Attachment.

== Adaptations ==
The novel was serialised on the BBC radio programme Woman's Hour in 1965. The novel was adapted for the stage by Adrian Benjamin in 1988, and performed in the United Kingdom and Australia. The novel was adapted for BBC Radio 4 in February 2000 by Elizabeth Proud
