= Café de Paris, London =

Nightclub in the West End of London, England

Café de Paris
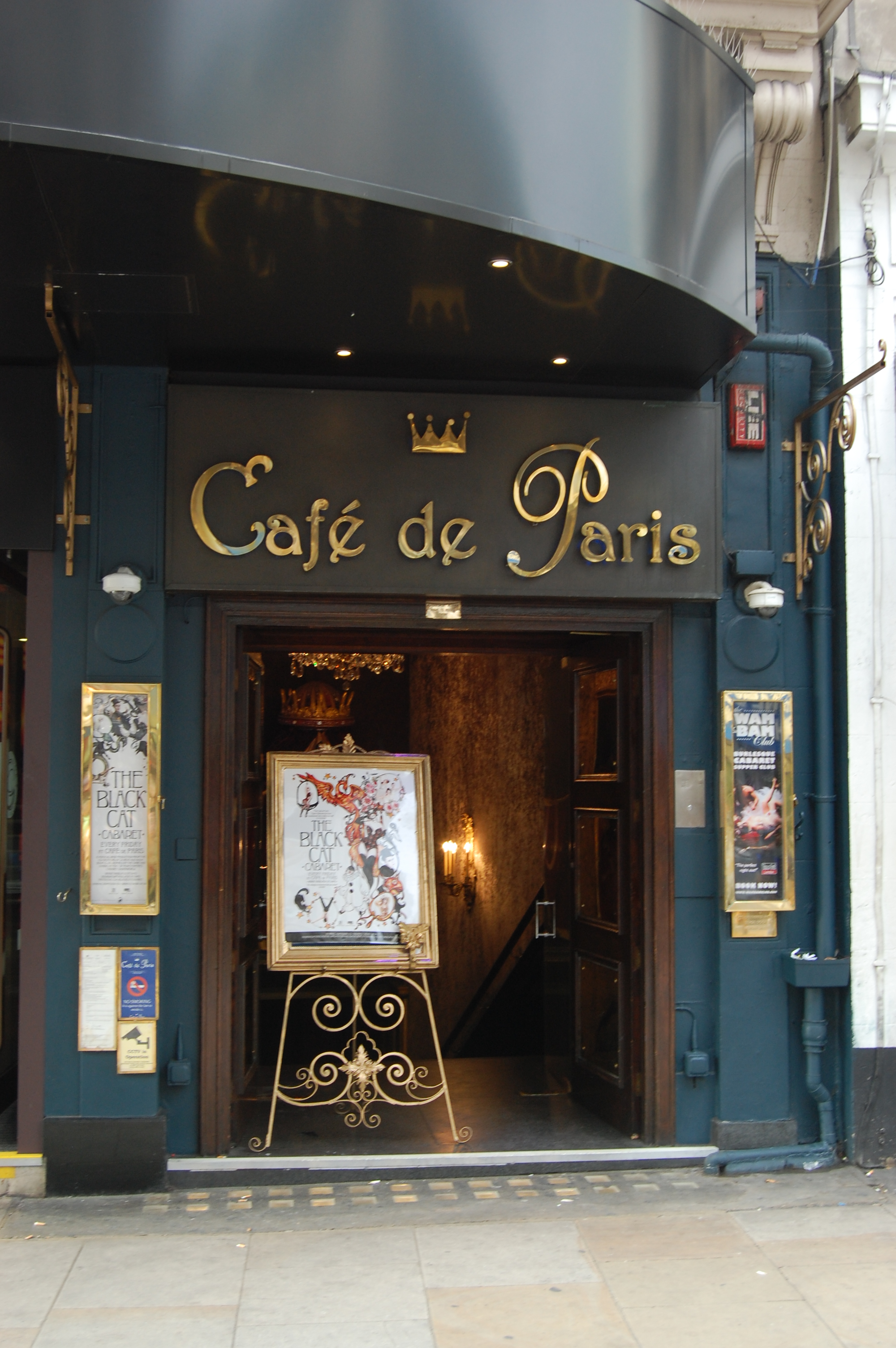
- The club's entrance in September 2013
- Interactive map of Café de Paris
- Address: 3–4 Coventry Street; London; England
- Coordinates: 51.5105°N 0.1319°W
- Capacity: 700
- Type: Nightclub

Construction
- Opened: 1924
- Reopened: 1948

Website
- web.archive.org/web/20210619180305/https://www.cafedeparis.com/

The Café de Paris was a nightclub in the West End of London, active from 1924–41 and 1948–2020. It was located on Coventry Street, which runs between Leicester Square and Piccadilly Circus.

In the 1930s it became one of the leading theatre clubs in London. On 8 March 1941, during The Blitz bombing campaign of the Second World War, the club was hit by a German bomb. The explosion killed at least 34 people, injured at least 80, and caused extensive damage to the building. The deceased included Kathleen Dunsmuir, daughter of James Dunsmuir, Governor of British Columbia. The club remained closed until 1948, when it reopened.

The club regained its popularity in the 1950s and operated successfully for decades. It closed permanently in December 2020, due to the economic effects of the COVID-19 pandemic in the United Kingdom. The venue was re-opened in February 2023 under a new name, Lío London.

== History ==
Café de Paris first opened in 1924 and subsequently featured such performers as Dorothy Dandridge, Marlene Dietrich, Harry Gold, Harry Roy, Ken Snakehips Johnson and Maxine Cooper Gomberg. Louise Brooks made history when she worked there in December 1924, introducing the Charleston to London.

Much of the early success of the Café de Paris was due to the visit of the then Prince of Wales who became a regular guest, often dining with notables from high society across Europe. Cole Porter was a regular, as was Aga Khan III.

=== Second World War ===
On the outbreak of the Second World War, the venue lowered its entry prices. It became less socially exclusive and attracted a more mixed clientele, including many officers from the armed forces on leave.

On 8 March 1941, soon after the start of a performance, a 50-kilogram (110 lb) bomb fell down a ventilation shaft into the basement ballroom and exploded in front of the stage. At least 34 people were killed and around 80 injured. The victims included the 26-year-old bandleader Ken "Snakehips" Johnson, his saxophonist Dave "Baba" Williams, other band members, staff and diners.

Sister Larvis, a nurse at Charing Cross Hospital stationed nearby, was first on the scene. Since reports were that the bomb fell through the centre skylight, the front of the building seemed untouched.

Confusion caused by bombing-related chaos in the West End that night delayed ambulances and rescue services; it was up to half an hour before they could access the basement area of the explosion. The Garland Hotel had also been hit, with many casualties for mobile units to attend to. Immediate aid came from doctors and nurses who were amongst the guests at the Café de Paris. Reportedly, several looters made their way into the blacked-out ballroom area and took jewellery from the dead and injured, resulting in forty soldiers from the Scots Guards being called to cordon off the building from the crowd that had gathered.

Actor Ballard Berkeley, best remembered for playing Major Gowen in the British television sitcom Fawlty Towers (1975 and 1979), was serving as a special constable with the Metropolitan Police during the Second World War, and witnessed the bombing of the nightclub firsthand.

=== Post-war ===
The venue did not reopen until 1948 but re-established itself as one of the leading theatre clubs in London, playing host to Judy Garland, Josephine Baker, Frank Sinatra, Ava Gardner, Humphrey Bogart, Lauren Bacall, James Mason, David O. Selznick, Jennifer Jones, Tony Hancock and Grace Kelly. In the 1950s Noël Coward often performed cabaret seasons there as did Marlene Dietrich.

In the mid-1980s, the Cafe de Paris was the venue for the regular Les nuits du Mercredi (Wednesday Nights), conceptualised by Anne Pigalle around her French take on cabaret and run by Nick Fry. Among the many personalities attending were David Bowie, Andy Warhol, Tina Turner, Mickey Rourke, George Michael and Steve Strange.

Later on, it was a location used in films including Absolute Beginners and The Krays.

=== 21st century ===
Brian Stein and his Maxwell's Restaurants Group purchased the venue in 2002.

It was used in the 2006 music video for "I Think We're Alone Now" by Girls Aloud. Today the venue is used regularly for film location, and has been used for scenes in The Queen's Sister (based on the life of Princess Margaret) and in The Edge of Love (based on the life of Dylan Thomas).

The Café de Paris, which hosted regular cabaret shows on Friday and Saturday nights, had a dress code for its club and dining room, which stated:

More smart than casual. No trainers or sportswear. Smart jeans are fine. No fancy dress or any other paraphernalia for hen parties. Vintage/Burlesque/cabaret attire is encouraged.

In December 2020, the venue's parent company Maxwell's Restaurant Group went into liquidation, reporting that they had been impacted by restrictions of the Covid-19 pandemic. In November 2022, it was reported that the venue would reopen in February 2023 under the ownership of the Pacha Group and renamed Lío London.

== In media ==
=== Literature ===
The 1941 bombing is described in a chapter of The Attenbury Emeralds by Jill Paton Walsh. The bombing and its aftermath have a considerable bearing on the investigation carried out by Lord Peter Wimsey in that book.

The café, and the bombing, are major plot devices in the 2011 novel Moon Over Soho by Ben Aaronovitch and are mentioned in the novel Transcription by Kate Atkinson.

Disguised as the Café Madrid, this event is also featured in a scene in The Soldier's Art, Anthony Powell's eighth novel in his A Dance to the Music of Time series, on which several of the characters in the series are killed when "a bomb hit the Madrid full pitch."

There is a passing reference to the air-raid in Barbara Pym's A Few Green Leaves.

The bombing features in AJ Pearce's novel Dear Mrs Bird (2018); in Kate Quinn's 2021 novel The Rose Code; and in the novel The Whalebone Theatre by Joanna Quinn, resulting in the death of one of the characters.

=== Music ===
During the war, the British composer Vaughan Williams had been writing his 6th Symphony, which premiered in 1948. The deaths of the band members moved him to incorporate elements of jazz, including a saxophone solo in the Scherzo movement. This influence was noted by the conductor Malcolm Sargent who took the symphony on its initial tour around the world.

=== Television and film ===
The Café de Paris and its 1941 bombing are discussed in the episode "Safest Spot in Town" in BBC Four's Queers, a series of monologues in response to the fiftieth anniversary of the Sexual Offences Act 1967.

The Music Video for the single "Tell Me Why" by Nick Heyward was filmed at Café de Paris, London in 1989. The song is from the album I Love You Avenue.

The café features in the Edgar Wright film Last Night in Soho.

There is also a passing reference to the cafe in the 5th episode of the 6th season of Downton Abbey.

The cafe was used as the strip club back drop in the 1991 comedy film King Ralph starring John Goodman and Peter O'Toole.

A sequence where a nightclub is bombed and the dead subsequently looted in Steve McQueen's 2024 film Blitz is clearly based on the Café de Paris incident (indeed Jonah Coombes, the film's Supervising Location Manager, refers to it as the Café de Paris, and Ken "Snakehips" Johnson is included in the character/cast list), though the nightclub is not named and the film is set in 1940.

=== Theatre ===
The Café de Paris is a main plot point in Matthew Bourne's production of Cinderella set during WW2 in London. It is the location of the main ball/party at the heart of the fairy tale. Act 2 begins with the cafe having just been bombed, destroyed and full of dead bodies. Then an Angel (the fairy Godmother equivalent) reverses time and brings the cafe fully to life.
