= Crampton Hodnet =

Posthumous novel by Barbara Pym

- First edition
- Author: Barbara Pym
- Language: English
- Genre: Comedy
- Publisher: Macmillan
- Publication date: 1985 (1st edition)
- Publication place: United Kingdom
- Media type: Print (hardbound)
- Pages: 222 (1st edition)
- ISBN: 0816139687

Crampton Hodnet is a comic novel by Barbara Pym, published posthumously in 1985, and originally written in 1940.

== Plot summary ==
The action takes place over the course of a year in North Oxford, some time before World War II. Miss Doggett likes to entertain students to tea at her gloomy Victorian home in Banbury Road. When a new and unmarried curate, Stephen Latimer, comes to lodge at her house, he strikes up a friendship with her paid companion, Jessie Morrow, through whose eyes much of the action is seen. He begins to see Jessie as a potential wife and proposes to her, but she rejects him, knowing that his interest in her is practical rather than romantic.

Miss Doggett's nephew, Francis Cleveland, a middle-aged don at the (fictitious) Randolph College of Oxford University, begins a romantic relationship with one of his students, Barbara Bird, who has a crush on him. He takes her out for tea, and they are seen by Miss Doggett and Miss Morrow. On another occasion two of Miss Doggett's student protégés see them together, and cannot resist reporting the sighting to her. Francis and Barbara visit the British Museum together; coincidentally, Edward Killigrew, a Bodley library assistant, is there at the same time and hears them declaring their love for each other. He shares the gossip with, among others, Miss Doggett, who drops hints to Francis's wife, Margaret.

Francis's daughter, Anthea, is in love with Simon Beddoes, the son of Lady Beddoes, and Miss Doggett is especially keen for the relationship to progress to marriage.

After Margaret finds out about Francis's relationship with Barbara, she leaves for a trip to London. Francis offers to take Barbara for a weekend in Paris but they only get as far as Dover, where Barbara gets cold feet and goes to stay with a friend, leaving Francis to return alone to Oxford, where Margaret forgives him. Simon breaks up with Anthea by letter; she soon begins dating again. Mr Latimer falls in love while on holiday, and it is expected that he will leave North Oxford for a living of his own and get married. As the new academic year dawns, Miss Morrow acknowledges that she will probably remain unmarried and that nothing ever really changes.

Crampton Hodnet is the name of a fictitious village invented by Mr. Latimer as an excuse for missing evensong one Sunday. Rather than admit to his vicar's wife that he has been for a walk with Miss Morrow and they simply got back too late, he claims that the vicar of Crampton Hodnet had asked him to take the service there. "Crampton" was one of the author's middle names, a family name on her father's side.

== Publication history ==
Pym began writing the novel in 1939. She had not yet been published, but had written at least two novels – Some Tame Gazelle and Civil to Strangers – already. By April 1940, Pym had finished Crampton Hodnet and sent it to close friends for their comments, describing parts of it as "as good as anything I ever did". The outbreak of World War II distracted Pym from her budding literary career, as she served in both England and Naples during the War. She made some alterations to the text in the early 1950s, after her first novel Some Tame Gazelle had been published by Jonathan Cape, but decided the text was too dated to publish. With the novel unpublished, Pym re-used the characters of Miss Doggett and Jessie Morrow in her 1953 novel Jane and Prudence and in the short story So, Some Tempestuous Morn which was later collected in the volume Civil to Strangers (1987).

After Pym's death in 1980, some hitherto unpublished material was released. Crampton Hodnet was revised by Pym's close friend and literary executor Hazel Holt and published in 1985 by Macmillan in England and E. P. Dutton in the United States.

In the 1980s Crampton Hodnet was released by Chivers Press as an audiobook read by Angela Pleasence. It was adapted by Elizabeth Proud for BBC Radio in 1992. The novel was published in Germany in 1994 as Tee und blauer Samt (Tea and Blue Velvet).

== Reception and analysis ==
When Crampton Hodnet was first published in 1985, The New York Times acknowledged that "the disparate parts of this novel do not quite mesh into the seamless wonder of later works" but was largely positive. The Christian Science Monitor found the book "as brilliant as ever". Kirkus Reviews also reviewed the book positively, noting that the book's "datedness", it having been published 45 years after it was written, "provides much of its charm". A. N. Wilson, writing in The Literary Review, was approving of the novel, complimenting especially the "rich period details". However, James Fenton, writing in The Times, felt that Pym was a "minor talent" and that the comparisons of her writing to Jane Austen's were overstated. Fenton argued that "she is obsessed with surfaces. ... I doubt that the novel will give that much comfort. It is too unsatisfactory."

Criticism of the book has examined the way in which Pym's early novel "represents nostalgia for the safety of the Victorian age", and that the novel's North Oxford setting has undertones of the 19th century. Crampton Hodnet has been seen as "both a romantic comedy and a laughing satire on the conventions of romantic comedy", with Pym utilising the tropes of the genre and also questioning them. The novel connects to Pym's other works in the realisation by characters that "relationships ... are always better in imagination than in actuality". The novel features some of Pym's common tropes, including intertextual use of quotes from English poetry, women being treated dismissively by men, and male characters who are exaggeratedly silly. Pym also uses clothing and alcoholic drinks as symbols to clarify characters' social positions, as when Miss Morrow finds the courage to wear a green dress she has been keeping for a special occasion even though it is inappropriate to her station in life, when Miss Doggett drinks sherry but claims it is medicinal, or Francis Cleveland takes a bottle of Niersteiner wine to accompany an evening's punting with Barbara. Charles Burkhart questioned whether the novel should have been released, arguing that it was a strong draft but was "the weakest of the eleven published novels", said that nevertheless it displayed Pym's great theme: "the involved versus the uninvolved life".

The character of Simon Beddoes is based on the British politician Julian Amery, with whom Pym had a brief romance.
