= The Sweet Dove Died =

1978 novel by Barbara Pym

- First edition
- Author: Barbara Pym
- Language: English
- Publisher: Macmillan
- Publication date: 1978 (1st edition)
- Publication place: United Kingdom
- Media type: Print (hardbound)
- Pages: 196 (1st edition)

The Sweet Dove Died is a novel by Barbara Pym, first published in 1978. The title is a quotation from a poem, "I Had a Dove", by John Keats.

== Synopsis ==
Leonora Eyre, an attractive and elegant, but essentially selfish, middle-aged woman, becomes friendly with antique dealer Humphrey Boyce and his nephew James. Both men are attracted to Leonora, but Leonora prefers the young, good-looking James to the more "suitable" Humphrey. While James is away on a buying trip, Leonora discovers to her annoyance that he has been seeing Phoebe, a girl of his own age. Leonora makes use of Humphrey to humiliate Phoebe, and turns out a sitting tenant in order that James can take up a flat in her own house. She does this in an apparent attempt to control his life. While abroad, the bisexual James has begun a relationship with an American, the amoral Ned, who returns with him to London. Ned prises James out of Leonora's grasp, only to engage with other partners then return to the States to escape the complications. James attempts a reconciliation with Leonora, but she refuses to give him a second opportunity to hurt her, and settles for the admiration of the less attractive Humphrey.

Like all Pym's fiction, the novel contains many literary references, notably to works by Keats, John Milton and Henry James.

== Publication history ==
Pym worked intermittently on the novel in the 1960s, commencing the first draft in 1968, noting that it was darker than her previous works, which had all been in the tradition of high comedy. The first (incomplete) draft was entitled Spring before Pym found her final title The plot of the novel is generally believed to have been inspired by Pym's brief romance with a Bahamian antiques dealer, Richard Roberts, known to his friends as "Skipper".

Pym had published six novels but her seventh, An Unsuitable Attachment, had been rejected by several publishers since its completion in 1963. Pym sent the draft to her long-time correspondent, the poet Philip Larkin, who provided detailed critical suggestions. "With fewer characters & slower movement", Larkin wrote, "it could be a strong, sad book"; Pym completed the rewrites in mid-1969, which included reducing the roles of the characters Phoebe and Rose, and increasing the role of "horrible Ned", as well as centring the work more on the character of Leonora. The novel was rejected by Macmillan in 1970, who deemed it "a risky commercial venture". Pym's novels had come to be seen as old-fashioned, and out of tune with the public taste, given their delicate plots and the focus on mundane details of everyday life. A reader's report for publishing house Peter Davies Ltd described the novel as "very accomplished" but not, Pym wrote, "powerful enough or plotted enough to appeal to enough readers". Thinking she might be taken more seriously as a male novelist, Pym sent the manuscript to some publishers under the name of "Tom Crampton", but it made no difference. The reader at Jonathan Cape advised that "while good nature is most lovable in an author, readers unfortunately seem to relish greater asperity in their books!". Ultimately 21 publishers passed on the novel, and Pym moved on to her next work, An Academic Question.

In 1977, Pym was rediscovered by the literary public after being praised in a special edition of the Times Literary Supplement, and her latest novel, Quartet in Autumn, was accepted by Macmillan. Before Quartet had even been published, Macmillan accepted Sweet Dove as well. Quartet was nominated for the 1977 Booker Prize, which further increased public interest in Pym's work. She expressed some trepidation about how audiences would take the new novel, as it was both very different in tone to Quartet and unlike her earlier novels ("there are no clergy in it").

The Sweet Dove Died was published in England by Macmillan in 1978 and in the United States by E.P. Dutton in 1979. The novel was released as an audiobook in 1993 by Chivers Press, read by Sheila Hancock. The novel was published in Dutch in 1987 as En mijn duifje ging heen, in Italy in 1991 as Se una dolce colomba, in Spain as Murió la dulce paloma , in France as La douce colombe est morte, and in Germany as Das Täubchen (Little Dove).

== Critical response ==
The book was widely praised by critics, including The Times and The Guardian, and reached No. 3 on the Sunday Times Bestsellers List. Kirkus Reviews was less positive, admiring the author's use of language but ultimately defining the novel as "sad, rather superficial". As Pym had predicted, some long-standing Pym readers were disappointed by the less overtly comic tone of the book, compared with her earlier novels. However, it is generally recognised as one of her best-constructed and most mature works. Mason Cooley has described it as "the most brilliant success of Barbara Pym's career".

== Connections to other works ==
Pym's characters often reappear throughout her work. Coming at the end of her career, there are fewer connections between The Sweet Dove Died and the rest of Pym's oeuvre, but the character of Ned reappears in the 1979 short story Across a Crowded Room, commissioned by The New Yorker, which is collected in the volume Civil to Strangers. 'Mrs Ainger' (Sophia) from An Unsuitable Attachment is mentioned.

== Adaptation ==
In 2014, the novel was adapted for the stage in a musical entitled The Mirror Never Lies, with book and lyrics by Joe Giuffre and music by Juan Iglesias. The production was first staged in concert in New York City and Los Angeles in 2014 before a full production at The Cockpit in London in 2015. The London production received mixed-to-negative reviews.
