= À La Pym =

1988 cookbook by Barbara Pym

- First edition
- Author: Hilary Pym and Honor Wyatt
- Language: English
- Genre: Cookbook
- Publisher: E.P. Dutton
- Publication date: 1988
- Publication place: United Kingdom
- Media type: Print (Hardback)
- Pages: 111
- ISBN: 978-0907325611

À La Pym: The Barbara Pym Cookery Book (published in the United States as The Barbara Pym Cookbook) is a 1988 cookbook by Hilary Pym and Honor Wyatt collecting recipes for meals served, or mentioned, in the novels of Hilary's sister, Barbara Pym. The book was published in the United States by E. P. Dutton in 1988, and in the United Kingdom by Prospect Books in 1995.

== Contents ==
Pym published her novels between 1950 and 1980, with many of them exploring the lives of spinsters, Anglican priests, and anthropologists. Especially in her early novels, which take place shortly after World War II when rationing was still in effect, Pym's characters are often noted for their simple meals. Food is often used in Pym's novels as a marker of class or social position, and many of Pym's characters face culinary disasters in her novels. In Some Tame Gazelle, the protagonist spinster sisters fret over whether to serve cauliflower cheese to the new vicar. When they serve some to a paid domestic, she is disgusted to find that there is a caterpillar on the cauliflower, leading to an awkward situation. In An Unsuitable Attachment, parts of which take place in Rome, English characters struggle to adjust to the food and the cuisine. Concerns about serving, eating, and affording food recur throughout Pym's oeuvre.

Wyatt and H. Pym take their inspiration from all 12 of Pym's completed novels. The recipes are accompanied by quotes from the novels. A few of the recipes included were Pym's own.

Many of the recipes are staples of English cuisine, and many were seen as old-fashioned by the time of the book's publication.

== Context and critical reception ==
The 1980s was a peak period for interest in Pym's work, especially in the US. After being ignored by publishers for 16 years, Pym had been rediscovered in 1977. All of her books were republished, and new volumes accepted by publishers, before her death from breast cancer in 1980. As a result of the strong interest, her literary executors made available several previously unpublished novels, an autobiography, and a biography.

The cookbook was well received. Publishers Weekly called it "respectfully yet whimsically presented" and noted the importance of cooking and other "small things in life" to Pym's literary style. The Paris Review notes that, while Pym herself was acknowledged as a good cook, the food featured in her novels is often (deliberately) unsatisfactory, and that renders the idea of a cookbook taken from her works rather unusual to 21st century tastes.
