= A Very Private Eye =

1984 autobiography by Barbara Pym

- First edition
- Author: Barbara Pym
- Language: English
- Publisher: Macmillan
- Publication date: 1984
- Publication place: United Kingdom
- Media type: Print (hardback)
- Pages: 360

A Very Private Eye: An Autobiography in Diaries and Letters is a 1984 publication of writings by the English novelist Barbara Pym. Released after Pym's death, the volume was edited by Pym's sister Hilary and her literary executor Hazel Holt.

== Synopsis ==
The volume contains excerpts from Pym's letters, diaries, and notebooks from 1932 to 1979. The sections contain commentary by Holt and Hilary Pym to provide context on Pym's life, relationships, and career as a novelist.

Pym was a dedicated journalist, who detailed her daily life as well as observations about people around her which she might use for a future novel. Pym kept a formal diary separate to her writing observations from 1931 to 1948, after which time she recorded both personal and literary ideas in the same series of notebooks.

Most years of Pym's adult life are represented, although the diaries are limited for the period 1950–1962. During this era, as well as publishing six novels, Pym was working full-time at the International African Institute in London and thus had less time to devote to keeping her notebooks. In 1990, Hazel Holt published A Lot To Ask: A Life of Barbara Pym, her biography of Pym. The two books are designed to complement each other; thus, Holt focuses much of her time on the years 1950–1962, filling out the gaps in the text of A Very Private Eye.

Heavily featured are letters between Pym and the poet Philip Larkin. The two authors shared a two-decade correspondence from 1961 until Pym's death, although they did not meet in person until 1975.

The volume was published by Macmillan in England and by E.P. Dutton in the United States.

== Context and reception ==
Barbara Pym's career had stalled after 1961. Having published six novels, she was no longer able to attract a publisher, and did not publish again until 1977, when she was rediscovered after being profiled in the Times Literary Supplement. Upon her rediscovery, Pym published three further novels and was nominated for the 1977 Booker Prize for Quartet in Autumn. She became a sensation in England and especially in the US. After her death from breast cancer in 1980, there was a strong demand from publishers for further content. As a result, Holt and Hilary Pym made available several previously unpublished novels, and followed those with this autobiography.

The New York Times reviewed the volume positively, as did the New York Review of Books. Kirkus Reviews acknowledged the appeal the volume would have for Pym fans but felt that too much material was included, some of it uninteresting or overly detailed.
