= Epilogue (disambiguation) =

An epilogue or epilog is a piece of writing usually used to bring closure to a work of literature or drama.

Epilogue or epilog may also refer to:

== Film ==
- Epilogue (1950 film), or The Orplid Mystery, a 1950 West German crime film
- Epilogue (1983 film), a Soviet drama film
- Epilogue (1984 film), a Spanish drama film
- Epilogue, a 2018 American experimental film from Nathaniel Dorsky's Arboretum Cycle

== Television ==
- "Epilogue" (Justice League Unlimited), an episode of Justice League Unlimited
- The Epilogue, appeared on BBC radio and television for many years as a sermonette
- "Epilogue" (CSI: NY episode), a season six premiere of CSI: NY

== Music ==
- Epilog (album), a 1994 album by Änglagård
- Epilogue, a 2001 album by To/Die/For
- Epilogue (album), a 2010 compilation album by Epik High
- Epilogue, a 2002 EP by Blake Babies
- "Epilogue", by Electric Light Orchestra from Time
- "Epilogue", by John Ireland
- "Epilogue, by Lovebites from Clockwork Immortality
- "Epilogue", by Twilight Force from Heroes of Mighty Magic
- "Epilogue", by Yoasobi from The Book
- "Epilogue", by Opeth from My Arms, Your Hearse
- "Epilogue", the final section of the 1975 Rush song "By-Tor and the Snow Dog" from Fly by Night

== Other ==
- Epilogue (periodical), a critical journal edited by Laura Riding
