= Epilogue (periodical) =

Epilogue: A Critical Summary was a periodical, biannual in theory but irregular in practice, which appeared between the years 1935 and 1938. It was edited by the American poet Laura Riding in association with Robert Graves and co-published by Constable and the Seizin Press. It contained critical essays on philosophy, politics, the arts and other subjects; also poems and artwork. The fourth and final volume, The World and Ourselves, took the form of a book by Riding.

== Background ==
In 1929 the poets Robert Graves and Laura Riding settled in the village of Deià in Mallorca, where they became the centre of a circle of like-minded friends – some correspondents, some visitors, and some who came to live there – that included James Reeves, Honor Wyatt, Gordon Glover, Norman Cameron, Len Lye, T. S. Matthews, John Aldridge, Eirlys Roberts, and Jacob Bronowski. In January 1935 they started a private magazine, Focus, as a vehicle for letters intended to keep them all up to date with each other's news. This simple project was soon to be eclipsed by the much more ambitious Epilogue.

== Character ==
Epilogue was intended as a twice-yearly periodical, though the outbreak of the Spanish Civil War and the editors' consequent move to London in August 1936 disrupted its publication schedule. It had an octavo hardback format and ran to about 250 pages per number. Laura Riding was listed as the journal's editor, Robert Graves as its associate editor. It consisted of critical and polemic essays written in plain, unliterary English on topics which ranged from religion and philosophy to language, poetry, drama, film and photography, among other subjects. All were collaborations, some being credited to multiple authors while those appearing under a single author's name included footnotes and endnotes giving the responses of other contributors. There were also original poems and artwork.

== History ==
In 1933, at an early stage in Epilogue's gestation when its proposed title was The Critical Vulgate, Graves and Riding found a potential publisher in Arthur Barker, though he soon began to get cold feet when he realized the scale of the proposed volumes. When he finally pulled out Graves turned instead to the firm of Constable & Co. In May 1935 they reached an agreement that Graves would partly finance the publication of the journal, Constable would distribute it, and it would appear under the imprint of both Constable and the Seizin Press, Graves and Riding's private small press. The first volume, dated Autumn 1935, appeared in November of that year under the title Epilogue: A Critical Summary, priced at 7s. 6d. It included contributions by Laura Riding, Robert Graves, James Reeves, T. S. Matthews, Honor Wyatt, John Cullen, John Aldridge, Len Lye, and Ward Hutchinson. Riding's part in this and later volumes was greater than appeared at first glance, partly because she rewrote the essays and poems submitted by others, and partly because some of her own bore the name "Madeleine Vara". Indeed, she later claimed all of the Madeleine Vara essays, though the name seems to have been used by other Epilogue contributors as well.

The second volume, dated Summer 1936, was published in July. Graves, Riding, "Vara", Wyatt, Reeves and Hutchinson were all credited, as were four new contributors: Alan Hodge, Kenneth Allott, Katharine Burdekin, and Gordon Glover.

The Spring 1937 volume, which appeared in April, concentrated more than previous ones on international politics. It featured Graves, Riding, "Vara", Hodge, Wyatt, Aldridge, Hutchinson, Matthews and Reeves, with this time Sally Graves (Robert's niece), Karl Goldschmidt, Basil Taylor, Robin Hale, Lucie Brown, William Archer, and Harry Kemp.

The final volume grew out of a circular "Personal Letter with a Request for a Reply", eventually to be known as the "First Protocol", which Riding sent in January 1937 to 400 public figures asking for their views on how personal action could prevent Europe's slide towards war. Less than a hundred replies were received, and few of those offered much encouragement to Riding's belief, expressed in the letter, that she herself together with a small number of "inside people" could by their example and influence save the world. She collected 65 of the replies for publication and composed her own responses, completing the resulting book in March 1938. Intended to be the fourth and last volume of Epilogue, it finally, after some difficulty in finding a publisher, appeared in November 1938 under the imprint of Chatto & Windus as The World and Ourselves by Laura Riding.

== Reception ==
While critical reaction to the first volume was generally unfavourable, Rebecca West did give it a boost in The Sunday Times. Thereafter, as Graves recalled a few years later, Epilogue "commanded increasing inattention in literary circles", though in the fraught atmosphere prevailing in Britain during the final few months before World War II The World and Ourselves was given serious consideration by reviewers in The Times Literary Supplement, The Bookseller (which compared it to Aldous Huxley's Ends and Means), and Time and Tide. For the rest of the 20th century Epilogue was largely ignored by literary historians, including academic critics of Graves's and Riding's works. However, Martin Seymour-Smith, Graves's friend and biographer, wrote that it was characterised by acute and intelligent criticism, typical of the work's presiding spirit, Laura Riding, and also by severity, dogmatism, unfriendliness, and lack of empathy. The World and Ourselves was described by the literary historian Miranda Seymour as "exasperatingly confused and dissatisfying", and by Riding's biographer Deborah Baker as "bewildering". In the present century the Riding scholar Mark Jacobs has argued for the importance of all four volumes as richly seminal influences on the later works of both Riding and Graves.

== Reprints ==
Eight Epilogue essays by Graves or co-authored by Graves and Riding were reprinted in revised form in his collection The Common Asphodel (1949). A disagreement between the two writers as to who owned copyright in the co-authored essays meant that the book could not be published in the United States. Four of them, all claimed by Graves as entirely his own, were again reprinted in the US (1956) and Penguin (1959) editions of a further Graves collection, The Crowning Privilege. In 2001 Carcanet Press published a selection of essays written mainly by Graves, Riding and "Madeleine Vara", Essays from "Epilogue", 1935–1937, edited by Mark Jacobs.
