= Quartet in Autumn =

1977 novel by Barbara Pym

- First edition
- Author: Barbara Pym
- Language: English
- Publisher: Macmillan
- Publication date: 1 September 1977
- Publication place: United Kingdom
- Media type: Print (Hardback & Paperback)
- Pages: 224 (hardback edition) & 192 (paperback edition)
- ISBN: 0-333-22778-6 (hardback edition) & ISBN 0-330-32648-1 (paperback edition)
- OCLC: 3555681
- Dewey Decimal: 823/.9/14
- LC Class: PZ4.P9965 Qar PR6066.Y58

Quartet in Autumn was the seventh novel by British writer and editor Barbara Pym to be published, appearing in 1977. Highly praised and shortlisted for the Booker Prize, its rather sombre theme contrasted with the light comedy of her earlier novels, dealing as it does with four office workers on the verge of retirement. The book was considered a comeback novel for Pym, who had fallen out of favour as styles changed and a more contemporary storyline was expected, in consequence of which her work had been rejected by publishers for 15 years.

== Plot summary ==
Marcia, Letty, Norman and Edwin work in the same office and are nearing retirement age. Three of them have never married and Edwin is now a widower. When the two women eventually retire, Letty plans to move to the country and live with her long-time friend Marjorie, a widow. She has to change her plans, however, when Marjorie announces that she is to marry a clergyman some years younger than herself. Norman lives a solitary life and is given to sardonic and bitter comments, although he once aroused the interest of Marcia in the past. Edwin is the more sociable man and fills his time outside work with visiting the various high churches in his neighbourhood.

The house in which Letty has a bedsit is sold to the leader of a Nigerian charismatic house church and she no longer feels comfortable there. Edwin finds her a room in the house of an elderly church-going widow, where she is reasonably at home and rather sceptically attends services with Mrs Pope as a result.

Once the two women retire, Marcia, already reclusive and vulnerable after having a breast removed, has to deal with the loss of the routine that was an essential part of her life. She withdraws even further from the outside world, eating less and less, and only begrudgingly allows visits from Janice Brabner, the voluntary social worker assigned by the local senior citizens' centre to keep in contact with her. Eventually Janice discovers Marcia in a state of collapse at the same time that Edwin and his friend, the parish priest Father G, come visiting. She is taken to hospital but dies a few days later, weighing six stone. Then it is discovered that she has unexpectedly left her house to Norman, who calls in his former colleagues to help him plan what to do with it.

A final development comes when Marjorie's fiancé deserts her for the younger and more capable Beth Doughty, warden of the retirement home to which Marjorie had unavailingly tried to persuade Letty to move. In the circumstances, Letty is not so sure she wants to live in the country and does not immediately make up her mind. She realises that at last she has opportunities to make her own choices. Similarly, Norman enjoys being in a position to decide whether or not to live in Marcia's house, though he is inclined to sell it.

At the end of the book, Letty tells Norman and Edwin that Marjorie has invited the three of them to join her for a day in the country. She thinks this would be a consolation for the jilted Marjorie and, though she envisages no romantic developments, enjoys being in a position to supply some male company.

== Publication history ==
Pym conceived of the novel in 1972:

Have thought of an idea for a novel based on our office move – all old, crabby characters, petty and obsessive, bad tempered – how easily one of them could have a false breast! But I'd better not write it till I have time to concentrate on it (look what happened to the last).

At the time, Pym was still working full-time at the International African Institute in London, and recovering from a mastectomy after developing cancer. As she transitioned to retirement in late 1973 and 1974, Pym commenced work on the novel. Whereas most of her books had been written in short time spans, Pym took three years to write Quartet in Autumn. She had not had a novel published since 1961, and had no realistic expectations that this would be either. She completed the novel in 1976, begun under the title Four Point Turn and, after being turned down by Jonathan Cape, submitted it to Macmillan Publishers as Last Quartet. The poet Philip Larkin, who had a long-running correspondence with Pym, read the final draft and found it very strong. He was surprised by the sombre tone, so unlike Pym's earlier comic style, and suggested the title did not suit.

On 21 January 1977, The Times Literary Supplement had run an article in which high-profile literary figures named their most underrated and overrated authors or books of the previous 75 years. Pym was chosen as the most underrated writer by both Larkin and Lord David Cecil; she was the only novelist to be selected by two contributors. On the strength of this review, literary interest in Pym was revived after 16 years and she was approached by several publishers for new material. The finally retitled Quartet in Autumn was published by Macmillan in 1977. It was published in the United States by E.P. Dutton the following year, the second of her novels to be so (Less than Angels had been published in a small run in the 1950s) and the first to have mainstream success in the US.

The novel was now nominated for the 1977 Booker Prize, of which the winner was eventually Paul Scott's Staying On. A year later it was released in Swedish translation as Höstlig kvartett and in 1995 as an audiobook.

== Reception ==
Combined with the media interest after the piece in The Times Literary Supplement, Quartet in Autumn was a success, with almost universally positive reviews, including in The Guardian and The Sunday Times. Kirkus Reviews considered the book "Terribly brisk, but very affecting". The only publications to write mixed reviews were The Sunday Telegraph and the New Statesman. As this was the first time most American readers had heard of Pym, there was especial interest in her from American media outlets. The New York Review of Books favourably reviewed Quartet alongside the earlier Excellent Women while The New York Times published a review entitled The Best High Comedy.

In later years, Quartet in Autumn was described as "a small ironic masterpiece on the theme of aging". Many readers had commented on how true to life was Marcia's mental and physical deterioration in particular.

== Intertextuality transformed ==
Pym customarily recycled her characters in various ways, but in this very different novel it is only glancingly as Edwin recalls Father Thames and Father Bode from A Glass of Blessings (1958).

While in earlier novels much more is made of occasions of social interaction, of eating and drinking together, it is the isolation of the characters that is emphasised here. On only one occasion do the four former colleagues meet for a meal after the women's retirement, and holidays like Christmas only serve to underline for them their sense of isolation. Paradoxically, the gathering of Letty, Norman and Edwin in the reclusive Marcia's house after her death becomes a turning point for them. The tins of food hoarded by lonely Marcia serve as the basis for a shared meal and an occasion to open the bottle of sherry that they discover there too. It is not so long afterwards that Letty, no longer diffident, subverts the expected pattern by proposing to the men the adventure of a trip together into the country.

The novel also subjects traditional certainties that are left unquestioned in her earlier novels to a more stringent examination. The charitable duties encouraged by Christianity are openly felt as burdensome, even by the most pious of the characters, and Father G. admits that he prefers visiting the homes of parishioners after their death rather than before. The task of social welfare is now perceived as succeeding to the post-war state, but as personified by the well-meaning Janice seems equally ineffectual in operation. Her thought processes are restricted by the training manual and the language of the official report. Pym's novels often add to their humour by making fun of organisations and their organisers. This one also examines tentatively how humanity can be discovered in a personal capacity in a changing social landscape.

== Adaptation ==
Quartet in Autumn was serialised by BBC radio on its Woman's Hour programme in 1978.

In 2015, York Theatre Royal commissioned a workshop version of a stage adaptation, written by Amanda Whittington and directed by C P Hallam.
