= Terje Dragseth =

Norwegian poet, author and film director

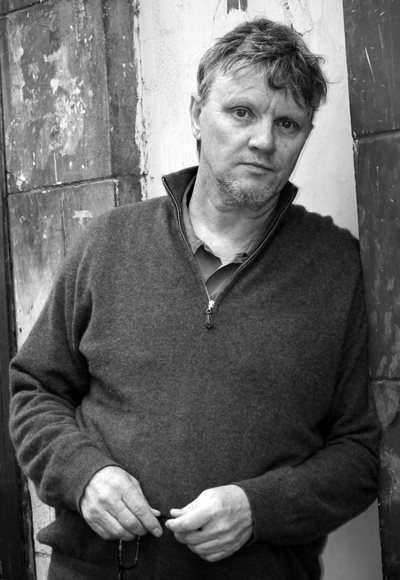
- Terje Dragseth; Credit: Miguel Borzelli Arenas
- Born: 1955 (age 70–71); Kristiansand, Norway
- Occupations: Poet, author and film director and music with I sing My Body Electric.

Terje Dragseth is a Norwegian poet, author and film director, born in Kristiansand in 1955. Dragseth made his debut in 1980 with his collection of poems titled "Offerfesten" (The Sermony of Sacrifice). Since then, he's published seventeen poetry collections, and also published poems in anthologies and literary journals. Two books of short stories "Den amerikanske turisten" and Drømmeboka (The Dream book).In 1996, several of his poems written between 1980 and 1995, were published in an anthology, titled "Du. Dikt i utvalg".

Dragseth has also directed several short films since he studied to become a film director in Copenhagen, Denmark, in 1983 to 1987, and he has translated poetic works of both Laura Riding Jackson and Leonard Cohen. Dragseth also have a rock band I Sing My Body Electric (ismbe.bandcamp.com & Spotify, iTunes, and other digital music platforms. According to the Norwegian literary journal, he has often been characterized as "an ecstatic" in contemporary Norwegian poetry, and he is considered to be one of the most prominent voices of his generation. He has asserted that humanism is central to his work and was awarded The Humanist Award for 1998 by the University of Agder in 1998 and Trizdán Vindtorn Poetry Prize in 2012. F.P. Jacks mindelegat 2018 (Denmark).

42 works in 122 publications in 6 languages and 249 library holding. Link: https://worldcat.org/identities/lccn-n80018622/

== Bibliography ==
Original works:

* 2026 Epifanier lll. Sparker til en kongle og forvandler verden. Poetry/short stories.

* 2025 Astronautmonologen. Novel (sci-fi).

- 2023 Regnbueørret og kokt ris. Poetry.
- 2022 VOODOO SCIENCE. Jakten på den intermentale partikkel. Poetry/short stories.
- 2021 Epifanier ll. Prose poems.
- 2020 Alt jeg er redd for. Poems.
- 2018 Drømmeboka.En okkult dagbok.Short stories.
- 2017 Sange til dem som tror. Text for mass, music by Peter Bruun
- 2017 Epifanier l. Prose poems.
- 2015 Jeg skriver språket. A poem.
- 2014 Solen sukker i min sko. (Short stories).
- 2012 Bella Blu, Handbook for space. Poems.
- 2009: Weisskjäje Sein Lied - Wittreihs leed, Gutleut Verlag, Frankfurt am main. Translation "Kvitekråkas song" by Tone Avenstroup, Bert Papenfuss.
- 2008: Ti titler: dikt 1980–2005. Ten collection of poems from 1980 to 2005.
- 2006: TDZ: publiserte & upubliserte dikt og tekster 1979–2006, (Poems and other texts from 1979 to 2006))
- 2005: Metaforenes tyranni? Essays in multi-author anthology
- 2005: Kvitekråkas song. A poem with CD. (The song of the white Crow).
- 2002: Logg. Poems.
- 2000: Fundament for dannelse av kaos. Poems.
- 1997: Den amerikanske turisten.Short stories.
- 1994: Den sovende. Poems.
- 1990: Vækst. Poem. ill. by Frans Jacobi.
- 1990: Kjærligheten er som døden, alltid levende. Poems.
- 1989: Nå er alle steder. Poems.
- 1987: Lili & revulusjonen (A play for Vladimir Majakovskij).
- 1987: Ennå allerede.Poems.
- 1985: Hymner og hypnoser. Poems.
- 1985: Reminiscens. (A short play)
- 1982: Jeg tenker, lik en pike som tar sin kjole av. Poems.
- 1980: Offerfesten. Poems and short texts.

Translations:

- 2006: Leonard Cohen: Lengselens bok, multi-author cooperation
- 2004: Laura Riding Jackson: Tid for helvete (A need for Hell).

Music with band I Sing My Body Electric available on : ismbe.bandcamp.com., also on Spotify, iTunes, and several music videos on YouTube. Last album "I Do Me" (2023) and singles from album "Hey You" and "Need" on Spotify, and album on band camp "Blood Is Thicker Than Sun", "The Norwegian Album" & "Swim Now I Always Care." https://open.spotify.com/artist/5riSFy3DtiaW0Z4kvUGLvb?si=5_s_dBRvTJiv4sD8R7yUXg
