= Rupert Gleadow =

Rupert Seeley Gleadow (22 January 1909 – 30 October 1974) was a British lawyer and author, who wrote on legal matters under the name of Justin Case. He also wrote extensively on astrology.

Gleadow was born in Leicester, the son of Frank and Mary Phyllis Gleadow (née Seeley), and was educated at Trinity College, Oxford. In his younger days he had a relationship with future novelist Barbara Pym. He married twice, having one daughter with his first wife Marguerite Rendu, and then marrying a painter named Helen Cooke Helen was the daughter of George Albert Cooke, and sister in law of Cecil Harmsworth King. Gleadow died in London, aged 65.

== Bibliography ==
- Astrology of Everyday Life Faber, 1940
- Origin of the Zodiac Cape, 1969
