= Tom Maschler =

British publisher and writer (1933–2020)

- Born: Thomas Michael Maschler; 16 August 1933; Berlin, Germany
- Died: 15 October 2020 (age 87); Luberon, France
- Education: Leighton Park School
- Occupation: Book publisher
- Known for: Booker Prize founder
- Notable work: Publisher (2005)
- Spouses: Fay Coventry (m. 1970; div. 1987) Regina Kulinicz (m. 1988; his death 2020)
- Children: 3

Thomas Michael Maschler (16 August 1933 – 15 October 2020) was a British publisher and writer. From 1960, he was influential as the head of publishing company Jonathan Cape over a period of more than three decades. Maschler was noted for instituting the Booker Prize for British, Irish and Commonwealth literature in 1969. He was involved in publishing the works of many notable authors, including Ernest Hemingway, Joseph Heller, Gabriel García Márquez, John Lennon, Ian McEwan, Bruce Chatwin and Salman Rushdie.

== Early life ==
Maschler was born in Berlin, Germany, to Austrian Jewish parents, Rita (Masseron) and Kurt Leo Maschler on 16 August 1933. His father was a publisher. Maschler was five years old when his family fled to the UK from Vienna after the Nazi annexation (Anschluss) of Austria. After his parents' separation, he moved to Henley-on-Thames, where his mother took on a housekeeping job.

After studying at Leighton Park School, he went to Roscoff, France, where he earned a scholarship to spend the summer in an Israeli kibbutz. It is mentioned that he had written a letter to Israeli Prime Minister David Ben-Gurion, who intervened to arrange a passage for Maschler from Marseille to Haifa. Maschler went on to spend the next three years travelling across the US, working in a tuna cannery, and assorted construction jobs, while writing for the Los Angeles Times and The New York Times. He returned home and worked as a tour guide, and did national service as a part of the Russian Corps of the Royal Air Force.

== Career ==
Maschler started his publishing career in 1955, as a production assistant at André Deutsch, followed by a stint at MacGibbon & Kee between 1956 and 1958. It was here that he published his first anthology of essays, Declaration, in 1957. The collection had essays from leading writers of the time. Earning a reprimand for some of his promotional interviews, he subsequently went on to join Allen Lane's Penguin Books as an assistant fiction editor.

He went on to head Jonathan Cape, after the death of its founder. One of Maschler's first assignments at Cape was to work with Mary Hemingway on papers that her husband Ernest Hemingway had left behind. These would be published as A Moveable Feast (1964).

As head of Jonathan Cape, Maschler was heavily involved in the creation of the Chatto, Virago, Bodley Head and Cape Group (CVBC), which later dissolved. He discovered and published many writers, including Gabriel García Márquez, Ian McEwan and Bruce Chatwin. One of Maschler's earliest coups was purchasing Joseph Heller's Catch-22 for £250. Maschler published two books, In His Own Write (1964) and A Spaniard in the Works (1965), based on John Lennon's doodles. He also published Salman Rushdie's Midnight's Children (1981).

Maschler was one of the key figures responsible for creating the Booker Prize in 1969. The award was envisioned as a British Commonwealth version of the French Prix Goncourt. Having seen the success of the French award, and the related sales uplift, Mascher approached Jock Campbell and Charles Tyrrell from the sugar trading firm Booker–McConnell to set up an equivalent for British books. P. H. Newby was the first winner of the prize for Something to Answer For, in 1969. The prize was sponsored by the Booker–McConnell group from 1969 to 2001, the Man Group from 2002 to 2019, and subsequently by the charitable foundation Crankstart.

In 1991, he stepped down from his position as the chairman of Jonathan Cape, when the company was sold to Si Newhouse's Random House Publishing. The company had been losing money for a few years prior, necessitating the deal. He was diagnosed with manic depression shortly after the deal went through.

His autobiography, Publisher, was published by Picador in 2005.

=== Criticism ===
Maschler was sometimes criticised for his forceful approach to publishing, with a charge that while he was good at identifying commercial best sellers, he had "little interest in books for their own sake". He was considered a galvanising force and criticised for being inhospitable to some of his authors.

He is noted to have played a key role in the career downturn of novelist Barbara Pym. In 1963, after joining Cape, Maschler rejected Pym's seventh novel, An Unsuitable Attachment, on the advice of two readers at the firm. Cape had published all of Pym's previous novels (although before Maschler had joined), and she expressed a belief that she was being unfairly treated, but was told that her novels were no longer attractive to readers. It would be 14 years until Pym had another novel published. The novelist never fully forgave Maschler. When she was rediscovered in 1977, she refused to let Cape publish her new novels. Pym and her sister Hilary invented a weak-tasting dessert, a combination of lime jelly and milk, and called it "Maschler pudding". After Pym's death, Maschler appeared in the 1992 television film Miss Pym's Day Out recounting his decision to reject the novel (which was posthumously published in 1982).

== Personal life and death ==
In 1970, Maschler married his first wife Fay Coventry, who went on to be a restaurant critic for the Evening Standard, and they had three children. The couple divorced in 1987, and he married his second wife, Regina Kulinicz, in 1988. He lived and travelled between his houses in London, France and Mexico.

Maschler died at the age of 87 on 15 October 2020, in a hospital near his home in Luberon, south-eastern France.

In the 2024 play Giant, Maschler's relationship with the author Roald Dahl, who Maschler acted as the agent for, he is played by Elliot Levey.
