= Gordon Glover =

British radio producer and writer

Claud Gordon Glover (7 June 1908 – 1 March 1975) was a British writer, particularly for radio, as well as some novels.

== Early life ==
Glover was born in Edinburgh in 1908, the son of William Gordon Glover (1879-1945), an engineer, and his wife Florence Edith (née Hardie) (1878-1956). His grandfather, Thomas Craigie Glover, was an Indian railway contractor. An aunt, Ann Liston Glover, married Lt-Gen Sir Frederick McCracken.

== Career ==
Glover was a BBC radio producer and presenter. One of his last radio broadcasts was an episode of The Countryside in Summer, broadcast in 1974.

He wrote articles for The Country Gentleman magazine under the pen name of Julian Grey. He wrote short stories and articles for various publications, including the Australian Woman's Mirror, Lilliput, the Radio Times, and the Wireless Weekly.

His first two novels were published by Geoffrey Bles, a London publisher with a reputation for spotting new talent. His son, Julian, described him as a "drunken journalist … hopeless with women".

== Works ==
- Cocktails at Six, (1934: Geoffrey Bles)
- Week-End in Town, (1934: Geoffrey Bles)
- Bolero. A novel, (1936: Cassell & Co)
- Family Gathering. A novel, (1937: Cassell & Co)
- Parish pump (by C. Gordon Glover as Julian Grey), (1975: Roundtree Press)
- Tom Forrest's country calendar (compiled by Charles Lefeaux from the original material written for The Archers by C. Gordon Glover and Phil Drabble), (1978: BBC)

== Personal life ==
Glover married the journalist and radio presenter Honor Wyatt (1910–98) in 1931 at St Peter's Church, Cranley Gardens. Before the Spanish Civil War, they lived in Spain for a while, where they befriended the poet Robert Graves and his lover Laura Riding. They had two children, Prue and the actor Julian. They separated in 1939; Glover then had a brief relationship with Honor's friend, the future novelist Barbara Pym, in 1942 which he broke off abruptly and which traumatised Pym. It prompted Pym to join the Wrens and, when Glover died in 1975, she burnt her diary for 1942.

He married, secondly, in 1946 the children's author Modwena Margaret Sedgwick (1916–96), who had previously been married to John Allen, at the time an actor but subsequently a noted theatre administrator.

He died in 1975, aged 66.
