= A Lot To Ask: A Life of Barbara Pym =

1990 Barbara Pym biography by Hazel Holt

A Lot to Ask
- First edition
- Author: Hazel Holt
- Language: English
- Publisher: Macmillan
- Publication date: 1990
- Publication place: United Kingdom
- Media type: Print (Hardback
- Pages: 310

A Lot To Ask: A Life of Barbara Pym is a 1990 biography of the English novelist Barbara Pym. The author, Hazel Holt, worked with Pym in the 1950s at the International African Institute in London before embarking on her own literary career. The pair remained friends, and Holt functioned as Pym's literary executor after the latter's death from breast cancer in 1980.

Holt had previously edited Pym's posthumous autobiography, A Very Private Eye, which collected the novelist's diaries and notebooks. Holt deliberately opted to have A Lot to Ask function as a companion volume to A Very Private Eye. As a result, some sections that are well-covered in that volume are not detailed here, and vice versa.

== Critical reception ==
The Los Angeles Times reviewed the book as being "touching" but felt that it suffered from Holt refraining from opinions and commentary, that there were too many unfiltered quotes from Pym herself. Publishers Weekly found the volume "well-written" but stressed that the close association of the editors with Pym's estate meant that there was still a need for "an objective look at the novelist's life". The New York Times review similarly complained that Holt treated her subject too reverently, without any critical analysis of the author's works.
