= An Unsuitable Attachment =

Novel by Barbara Pym, written in 1963 and published posthumously in 1982

- First edition
- Author: Barbara Pym
- Language: English
- Genre: Comedy
- Publisher: Macmillan
- Publication date: 1982 (1st edition)
- Publication place: United Kingdom
- Media type: Print (hardbound)
- Pages: 262 (1st edition)

An Unsuitable Attachment is a novel by Barbara Pym, written in 1963 and published posthumously in 1982.

== Synopsis ==
Ianthe Broome is a well-bred librarian in her mid-thirties who has been left in comfortable circumstances by her late parents, so that she is able to buy a house in an up-and-coming London suburb. A new neighbour is Rupert Stonebird, an anthropologist. Both attend the local church, St Basil’s, and get to know the vicar and his wife, Mark and Sophia Ainger (and their cat Faustina). Sophia would like her younger sister Penelope to find a husband; she regards Rupert as a suitable candidate and Ianthe as a possible rival.

Mervyn Cantrell, the head of the library at which Ianthe works, appoints a new library assistant, John Challow, five years younger than Ianthe and from a lower social class. He is attracted to Ianthe, but Ianthe is conscious of their dissimilarities, and in any case ‘did not like men very much, except for the clergy’.

Mark and Sophia take a small group of parishioners, including Ianthe, to Rome. Penelope is also of the party. Rupert is at a conference in Perugia at the same time, and joins the group in Rome afterwards, thereby seeing more of Ianthe and Penelope. Sophia invites Ianthe to accompany her on a visit to her aunt’s villa near Naples. Being apart from John makes Ianthe realise that she loves him.

Back at work, Ianthe receives an unexpected proposal of marriage from Mervyn, whose ‘love’ arises from his envy of her furniture. Rupert too begins to court Ianthe, and she confesses that she loves someone else. John visits Ianthe to return some money she had lent him, and they declare their mutual love. They become engaged, scandalising some of her friends and family. At the wedding, Rupert resolves to ask Penelope out.

== Publication history ==
This novel is notable as the first of Pym's novels to be rejected by publishers after she had established herself as a novelist. Pym completed the novel in February 1963 and sent it to Jonathan Cape, who had published all six of her previous novels. However, the novel was rejected. Pym wrote back to Cape to express her feeling that she had been unfairly treated, and received a sympathetic but firm response. Editor Tom Maschler, who had joined Jonathan Cape in 1960, made the decision to reject the novel. Maschler himself did not read the novel, but was given negative feedback by two readers at the company.

Over the course of 1963, Pym sought out other publishers, including Longman and Macmillan, but was told that the novel was unsuitable or not likely to sell. According to some accounts, the reason was its being "out of step with the racier literary climate of the sixties"; others say Cape and possible further publishers viewed it as commercially unviable, even when endorsed by Philip Larkin, who said: "It was a great pleasure and excitement to me to read An Unsuitable Attachment in typescript and I thoroughly enjoyed it. I found it continuously amusing and interesting – I have tried to keep my eye open for anything that would suggest why Cape's should not publish it, and I am bound to say that it still seems a mystery to me."

Pym continued to revise the novel throughout 1964 and 1965. At one point, she changed the title to Wrapped in Lemon Leaves. Among other titles Pym considered for the novel were The Canon's Daughter and Reserved for Crocodiles.

Pym would not have another novel published until 1977, when she was rediscovered by the reading public. She died in 1980, and An Unsuitable Attachment was finally published in 1982 by Macmillan in England and E.P. Dutton in the United States. The English edition included a foreword by Larkin as well as a note by her literary executor, the novelist Hazel Holt. The novel was recorded as an audiobook by Gretel Davis for Chivers Press in the 1980s and by Penelope Keith for the BBC in 1991. The novel was published in France in 1989 as Une demoiselle comme il faut (A Good Lady), and in Italy in 1987 as Una relazione sconveniente (An Improper Relationship).

The sections of the novel set in Rome were based on Pym's experiences in the city in 1961, where she was a delegate at an anthropology conference.

== Reception ==
On publication after Pym's death, the novel was well received. The Washington Post said that "the publisher must have been mad to reject this jewel", and The New York Times called it "a paragon of a novel". The Boston Phoenix was less effusive, but noted that it was Pym's "quietness, of course, that makes her so very much an Anglophile’s cup of tea."

Pym herself was not satisfied with the work; in a letter to Larkin, she later agreed that the lead character, Ianthe, was "very stiff" and that she had originally intended John to be a "much worse" character. Larkin wrote that he found himself "not caring very greatly for Ianthe...her decency and good breeding are stated rather than shown", and he further observed: "I don't myself think that the number of the characters matters much; I enjoyed the book's richness in this respect. What I did feel was that there was a certain familiarity about some of them; Sophia and Penelope seemed to recall Jane and Prudence, and Mark Nicholas; Mervyn has something of Arthur Grampian, and of course we have been among the anthropologists before. What this adds up to is perhaps a sense of coasting - which doesn't bother me at all, but which might strike a critical publisher's reader – unsympathetic I mean rather than acute – as constituting 'the mixture as before'."

== Connections to other works ==
Pym liked to bring back characters from previous novels to make minor reappearances. An Unsuitable Attachment is particularly notable for this. It features appearances by or mentions of Harriet Bede from Some Tame Gazelle, Professor Fairfax and Digby Fox from Less than Angels, Wilf Bason from A Glass of Blessings, and several characters from Excellent Women including Esther Clovis, Everard Bone, his wife Mildred and his mother, and Sister Blatt.

Pym re-used the characters of Mark and Sophia, as well as the cat Faustina, from An Unsuitable Attachment for her short story "A Christmas Visit", commissioned by the Church Times in 1978. The story was later collected in Civil to Strangers (1987).

== Adaptation ==
The novel was adapted for Book at Bedtime on BBC Radio 4 in 10 15-minute episodes in 1989 and was read by Penelope Keith.
