= Honor Wyatt =

English journalist and radio presenter

Honor Ellen Wyatt (6 February 1910 – 23 October 1998) was an English journalist and radio presenter, known for her association with Barbara Pym, Robert Graves, and Laura Riding as well as for her own work. She was the mother of the actor Julian Glover and the musician Robert Wyatt.

She was born Honor Ellen Wyatt; through her father, she was a second cousin of politician Woodrow Wyatt. Through her work at the BBC, Wyatt met the producer C. Gordon Glover, who became her husband. They had two children, Julian and Prudence. During the 1930s, Wyatt and her husband lived in Majorca, where they became acquainted with the poets Robert Graves and Laura Riding, who had set up home there. Wyatt contributed to Epilogue, the periodical published by Riding and Graves, and her novel, The Heathen, was published by the Seizin Press which they ran.

During the Second World War, the Glovers separated, and Wyatt went to work for the BBC in Bristol, as a scriptwriter for the Children's Department. Wyatt had by now become friendly with the budding novelist Barbara Pym, who shared the family's Bristol home for a time. Pym fell in love with Gordon Glover but was eventually rejected by him.

Following their divorce Honor married George Ellidge, an industrial psychologist, by whom she had a son, Robert; they did not move in together until Robert was six. Ellidge contracted multiple sclerosis and died in 1963, while the couple were in Italy where they had planned to settle. After this, she returned to work at the BBC, adapting Ronald Kirkbride's 1967 novel Yuki for radio.

== Publications ==
- The Heathen. A novel (1937)
- The young traveler in Portugal (1955)
- How Local Government Works (1957)
- Why Pick on Us (with George Ellidge; 1958)
- Crisis Cookery (1959)
- Young people abroad (1961)
- The Barbara Pym Cookbook (with Hilary Pym; 1988)
