= Barbara Pym =

English novelist (1913–1980)

Barbara Pym FRSL
- Born: Barbara Mary Crampton Pym; 2 June 1913; Oswestry, Shropshire, England
- Died: 11 January 1980 (aged 66)
- Resting place: Holy Trinity churchyard, Finstock, Oxfordshire, England
- Education: St Hilda's College, Oxford
- Occupations: Novelist; Assistant editor of Africa

Barbara Mary Crampton Pym (2 June 1913 – 11 January 1980) was an English novelist. In the 1950s, she published a series of social comedies, of which the best known are Excellent Women (1952) and A Glass of Blessings (1958). After a period of rejection by publishers, her career was revived in 1977 when the critic Lord David Cecil and the poet Philip Larkin nominated her as the most underrated writer of the previous 75 years. Her novel Quartet in Autumn (1977) was nominated for the Booker Prize that year, and she was elected as a Fellow of the Royal Society of Literature.

== Biography ==
=== Early life ===
Barbara Mary Crampton Pym was born on 2 June 1913 at 72 Willow Street in Oswestry, Shropshire, the elder daughter of Irena Spenser, née Thomas (1886–1945) and Frederic Crampton Pym (1879–1966), a solicitor. She was educated at Queen's Park School, a girls' school in Oswestry. From the age of 12, she attended Huyton College, near Liverpool. Pym's parents were active in the local Oswestry operatic society, and she was encouraged to write and be creative from an early age. She spent most of her childhood at Morda Lodge in Morda Road, Oswestry, where in 1922 she staged her first play, The Magic Diamond, performed by family and friends.

In 1931 she went to St Hilda's College, Oxford, to study English. There she developed a close friendship with the future novelist and literary critic Robert Liddell, who would read her early works and provide key feedback. She took a second-class BA honours degree in English in 1934. In the 1930s she visited Germany several times, developing a love for the country, and a romantic relationship with a young Nazi officer, Friedbert Gluck. She initially admired Hitler, and did not foresee the advent of war, but she later recognised her "blind spot", and removed a character based on Gluck from the novel she was writing.

In early 1939, Pym approached Jonathan Cape about a job in publishing; none was available at the time. The outbreak of World War II changed her plans, and in 1941 she went to work for the Censorship Department in Bristol, initially checking letters between Irish families in Britain and Ireland. Later, she joined the Women's Royal Naval Service. From 1943 she served in naval postal censorship in Southampton, and was subsequently posted to Naples. She had learned about coded messages while an examiner, and may have worked for or with MI5.

=== Personal life ===
In June 1946, Pym started work at the International African Institute in London. She became the assistant editor of the scholarly journal Africa, and continued in this role until her retirement in 1974. That inspired her use of anthropologists as characters in some of her novels, notably Excellent Women, Less than Angels and An Unsuitable Attachment. Pym's sister Hilary separated from her husband in 1946, and the two sisters moved into a flat in Pimlico. Later they moved to a house in Queen's Park.

Pym did not marry or have children, but had several close relationships with men. In her undergraduate days, they included Henry Harvey (a fellow Oxford student, who remained the love of her life) and Rupert Gleadow. When she was 24 she had a romance with the future politician Julian Amery, six years her junior. In 1942 she had a brief relationship with the BBC radio producer Gordon Glover, who was the estranged husband of her friend Honor Wyatt. Glover broke this off abruptly, which deeply upset Pym, and when Glover died in 1975 she burnt her diary for 1942.

=== Early literary career ===
Pym wrote her first novel, Some Tame Gazelle, in 1935, but it was rejected by numerous publishers, including Jonathan Cape and Gollancz. She wrote another novel, Civil to Strangers, in 1936, and several novellas in the following years, which were published as Civil to Strangers after Pym's death. In 1940, Pym wrote the novel Crampton Hodnet, which was also published after her death.

After some years of submitting stories to women's magazines, Pym heavily revised Some Tame Gazelle, which this time was accepted by Jonathan Cape, and published in 1950. The poet Philip Larkin described Some Tame Gazelle as Pym's Pride and Prejudice. The novel follows the lives of two middle-aged spinster sisters in an English village before the War, who in the course of the narrative are both given offers of marriage but turn them down in favour of their settled life. That year, Pym also had a radio play – Something to Remember – accepted by the BBC.

Pym's second novel, Excellent Women (1952), was well received, but her third, Jane and Prudence (1953), received more mixed reviews. Her fourth novel, Less than Angels (1955), had poorer sales than the previous three, but it attracted enough attention to be Pym's debut novel in the United States. A representative from Twentieth Century Fox came to England with an interest in securing the film rights, but this fell through.

Pym's fifth novel, A Glass of Blessings (1958), was poorly reviewed. Pym noted that – of her first six novels – it was the worst reviewed. However, the inclusion of sympathetic homosexual characters, in an era when homosexuality was largely frowned upon, and homosexual acts between men were illegal, attracted some interest in contemporary reviews, including The Daily Telegraph. Pym's sixth novel was No Fond Return of Love (1961), in which two women engaged in editorial work fall in love with the same man. The book continued the trend of Pym's novels receiving minimal critical attention. Nonetheless, it was positively reviewed in Tatler, the reviewer commenting:

I love and admire Miss Pym's pussycat wit and profoundly unsoppy kindliness, and we may leave the deeply peculiar, face-saving, gently tormented English middle classes safely in her hands.

When Pym made a less than flattering allusion to a Marks and Spencer's dress in her work, the company's legal department was sufficiently concerned by her influence to write to her.

=== "Wilderness years" ===
In 1963, Pym submitted her seventh novel – An Unsuitable Attachment – to Cape. Editor Tom Maschler, who had recently joined the firm, rejected the manuscript, on the advice of two readers. Pym wrote back to protest that she was being unfairly treated, but was told (sympathetically but firmly) that the novel did not show promise. Pym revised the manuscript and sent it to several other publishers, but with no success. Pym was advised that her style of writing was old-fashioned, and that the public were no longer interested in books about small-town spinsters and vicars. She was forced to consider finding a new authorial voice, but concluded that she was too old to adapt to what publishers considered popular taste. Pym was told that the minimum 'economic figure' for book sales was 4,000 copies; several of her books from the 1950s had not achieved that number.

As a result, Pym did not publish anything from 1962 until 1977. Nevertheless, she continued to write novels and short stories, and to refine existing works, while she continued her career at the International African Institute. Pym never fully forgave Cape, or Tom Maschler. She and her sister invented a dessert called "Maschler pudding", which was a combination of lime jelly and milk. In 1965, she wrote in a letter, "I really still wonder if my books will ever be acceptable again". Pym wrote The Sweet Dove Died in 1968 and An Academic Question in 1970. She submitted Dove to several publishers but it too was rejected. However, her earlier novels were reprinted during this period because of popular demand in public libraries.

Pym wrote 27 short stories, of which only six were published during her lifetime. The remainder are stored in the Pym archives at the Bodleian Library.

In 1961, Pym began a correspondence with Philip Larkin, as he wanted to write a review article of her novels. They continued to exchange letters for 19 years, up to her death. They met for the first time in April 1975, at the Randolph Hotel, Oxford.

In 1971, Pym was diagnosed with breast cancer and underwent a mastectomy of her left breast. The operation was successful and she was deemed clear of cancer. In 1972, Pym and her sister Hilary purchased Barn Cottage in Finstock in Oxfordshire. The sisters played an active role in the social life of the village. Pym retired in 1974. That year, she had a minor stroke, which left her temporarily with something like dyslexia. She continued to write, and completed Quartet in Autumn in 1976; it was rejected by Hamish Hamilton Limited. Although Pym was no longer being published, she was appointed to the awards committee of the Romantic Novelists' Association.

=== Rediscovery and final years ===
On 21 January 1977, the Times Literary Supplement ran an article in which high-profile writers and academics named their most underrated and overrated books or authors of the previous 75 years (the lifetime of the publication). Pym was chosen as the most underrated writer by both Larkin and Lord David Cecil, and was the only person to be selected by two contributors. On the strength of that article, literary interest in Pym was revived after 16 years. Pym and Larkin had kept up a correspondence for 17 years, but even his influence had been of no use in getting her a new publishing contract. Several publishing companies now expressed an interest, including her former publisher Cape. Pym rejected them in favour of Macmillan, who agreed to publish Quartet in Autumn the same year. Before Quartet had been published, Macmillan also agreed to publish The Sweet Dove Died, which she had reworked since completing it 10 years earlier. Cape reprinted her earlier novels, to which they still had the rights. The BBC interviewed Pym for a programme, Tea with Miss Pym, which aired on 21 October 1977. Reviews of Quartet were almost uniformly positive, and the novel was nominated for the 1977 Booker Prize, which went to Paul Scott for Staying On.

The rediscovery also meant that Pym attracted more notice in the United States (Less Than Angels had been published there earlier). E. P. Dutton secured the rights to all of her existing novels and, starting with Excellent Women and Quartet in Autumn, published her entire oeuvre between 1978 and 1987. The discovery of Pym's novels, combined with the narrative of her "comeback", made her a minor success in the USA during that period. Following her return to the public eye, she was elected as a Fellow of the Royal Society of Literature. Pym was the subject of Desert Island Discs on 1 August 1978; the episode was replayed on BBC Radio 4 Extra on 2 June 2013 – the centenary of her birth.

Pym's later novels have a more sombre, reflective tone than her earlier ones, which were in the high comedy tradition. By mid-1977, she had conceived an idea for her next novel, A Few Green Leaves, which would turn out to be her last. In January 1979, a lump in Pym's abdomen was diagnosed as malignant, a return of the breast cancer she had had in 1971. She underwent chemotherapy while completing the draft of A Few Green Leaves. Aware that she did not have long to live, she attempted to complete the novel before her death. She had already conceived the plot of another novel, which would follow two women from different social backgrounds, starting with their youth and moving through to maturity, including sequences set in World War II, but she would never have the opportunity to work on it. By October 1979, Pym was confined to bed. Although not entirely satisfied with the final draft of A Few Green Leaves, she submitted it to Macmillan, and it was published in 1980, shortly after her death.

On 11 January 1980, Barbara Pym died of cancer, aged 66. Following her death, her sister Hilary continued to champion her work, and was involved in setting up the Barbara Pym Society in 1993. Posthumously, Crampton Hodnet, An Academic Question and An Unsuitable Attachment were published, in conjunction with Pym's literary executor, the novelist Hazel Holt. Holt and Hilary Pym also published Civil to Strangers and Other Writings, a collection of writings mostly from Pym's early years. Holt and Hilary Pym published three more volumes: A Very Private Eye, an "autobiography" based on Pym's diaries and letters, A Lot To Ask: A Life of Barbara Pym, a biography written by Holt, and A la Pym, a cookbook comprising recipes for dishes featured in Pym's novels.

Hilary lived at Barn Cottage until her death in February 2004. The Pym sisters are buried in Finstock churchyard. In 2006, a blue plaque was placed on the cottage.

== Legacy ==
The Barbara Pym Society, established by fans of the author, was formed on 15 April 1994, following a literary weekend exploring the work of Barbara Pym held at St. Hilda’s College in 1993. The Society holds its Annual General Meeting at St. Hilda’s every September. The Barbara Pym Society also holds a spring meeting in London, and an annual North American conference in Cambridge, Massachusetts.

An English Heritage blue plaque honouring Pym was installed at 108 Cambridge Street, Pimlico, London on 1 May 2025, marking where she lived between 1945 and 1949.

== Works and themes ==
Several themes link works in the Pym canon, which are more notable for their style and characterisation than for their plots. A superficial reading gives the impression that they are sketches of village or London life, and comedies of manners, studying the social activities connected with the Anglican church, Anglo-Catholic parishes in particular. Pym attended several churches over her lifetime, including St Michael and All Angels Church, Barnes, where she served on the Parochial Church Council.

Pym examines aspects of relations between women and men, including the unrequited feelings of women for men, which are based on her own experience. Pym was one of the first popular novelists to write sympathetically about gay characters, notably in A Glass of Blessings. She portrayed the layers of community and figures in the church through church functions. The dialogue is often deeply ironic. A tragic undercurrent runs through some of the later novels, especially Quartet in Autumn and The Sweet Dove Died.

More recently, critics have noted the serious engagement with anthropology that Pym's novels depict. The seemingly naive narrator Mildred Lathbury (Excellent Women), for example, actually engages in a kind of participant-observer form that represents a reaction to the structural functionalism of the Learned Society's focus on kinship diagrams. Tim Watson links Pym's acute awareness of the social changes in the apparently cosy world of her novels to a critique of functionalism's emphasis on static social structures.

Pym's novels are known for their intertextuality. All of Pym's novels contain frequent references to English poetry and literature, from medieval poetry to later work, including John Keats and Frances Greville.

Additionally, Pym's novels function as a shared universe, in which characters from one work cross over into another. Usually the reappearances are in the form of cameos, or mentions by other characters. For instance, the relationship between Mildred Lathbury and Everard Bone is left unconfirmed at the end of Excellent Women . However, the characters are referenced or appear in Jane and Prudence, Less than Angels and An Unsuitable Attachment, and their marriage and happiness are confirmed. Esther Clovis, a leading member of the anthropological community, appears first in Excellent Women and then in two other novels; after her death her memorial service is seen from the point of view of two (unrelated) characters in An Academic Question and A Few Green Leaves. Esther Clovis is thought to have been inspired by Beatrice Wyatt, Pym's predecessor as assistant editor of Africa.

== Popular culture and reputation ==
Forewords to her novels have been written by A. N. Wilson, Jilly Cooper and Alexander McCall Smith.

Philip Larkin said, "I'd sooner read a new Barbara Pym than a new Jane Austen". Shirley Hazzard was a fan of Pym's work, which she described as "penetrating, tender, and ... greatly daring". The novelist Anne Tyler wrote:

Whom do people turn to when they've finished Barbara Pym? The answer is easy: they turn back to Barbara Pym.

On 19 February 1992, the British television series Bookmark broadcast an episode entitled Miss Pym's Day Out, written and directed by James Runcie. The film follows Pym (played by Patricia Routledge) from dawn to evening on the day she attended the 1977 Booker Prize awards, for which Quartet in Autumn was nominated. The script includes excerpts from Pym's letters and diaries. Appearances by real-life figures, including Hilary Pym, Hazel Holt, Jilly Cooper, Tom Maschler and Penelope Lively, are contrasted with adapted excerpts from Pym's novels performed by actors. The film was nominated for a BAFTA Huw Wheldon award for Best Arts Programme and won the Royal Television Society award for Best Arts Programme.

== Novels in order of publication ==
- Some Tame Gazelle (1950) ISBN 1-55921-264-0
- Excellent Women (1952) ISBN 0-452-26730-7
- Jane and Prudence (1953) ISBN 1-55921-226-8
- Less than Angels (1955) ISBN 1-55921-388-4
- A Glass of Blessings (1958) ISBN 1-55921-353-1
- No Fond Return of Love (1961) ISBN 1-55921-306-X
- Quartet in Autumn (1977) ISBN 0-333-22778-6
- The Sweet Dove Died (1978) ISBN 1-55921-301-9
- A Few Green Leaves (completed 1979/1980; published posthumously, 1980) ISBN 1-55921-228-4
- An Unsuitable Attachment (written 1963; published posthumously, 1982) ISBN 0-330-32646-5
- Crampton Hodnet (completed circa 1940, published posthumously, 1985) ISBN 1-55921-243-8
- An Academic Question (written 1970–72; published posthumously, 1986)
- Civil to Strangers (written 1936; published posthumously, 1987)
- "Poor Mildred", "They Never Write"; "The German Baron" (short stories; published posthumously, 2024) ISBN 979-8-218-42830-3

== Biography and autobiography ==
- Barbara Pym, A Very Private Eye: An Autobiography in Diaries and Letters, edited: Hazel Holt and Hilary Pym (1984)
- Hilary Pym and Honor Wyatt, À la Pym: The Barbara Pym Cookery Book (1988)
- Hazel Holt, A Lot To Ask: A Life of Barbara Pym (1990)
- Yvonne Cocking, Barbara at the Bodleian: Revelations from the Pym Archives (2013; ISBN 978-0615765662)
- Paula Byrne, The Adventures of Miss Barbara Pym, London : William Collins; ISBN 978-0008322205 (2021)
