= Seizin Press =

Old press in London

- Industry: Publishing
- Founded: 1927; 99 years ago in London, England
- Founders: Laura Riding; Robert Graves
- Headquarters: Mallorca (from 1930)

The Seizin Press was a small press, founded in 1927 by Laura Riding and Robert Graves in London from 1928 until 1935. From 1930 it was based in Mallorca.

Besides work by Graves and Riding, the Seizin Press published works by Gertrude Stein, Len Lye, Honor Wyatt and James Reeves. During the 1980s, a "New Seizin Press" was operated by an acquaintance of Graves.

Seizin Press Vero is owned and operated by the Laura (Riding) Jackson Foundation located in Vero Beach, Fl. The first volume "Decades" represents poetry by leading American poets who have participated in the Foundation's annual "Poetry & Barbecue."
