= Laura Riding =

American writer (1901–1991)

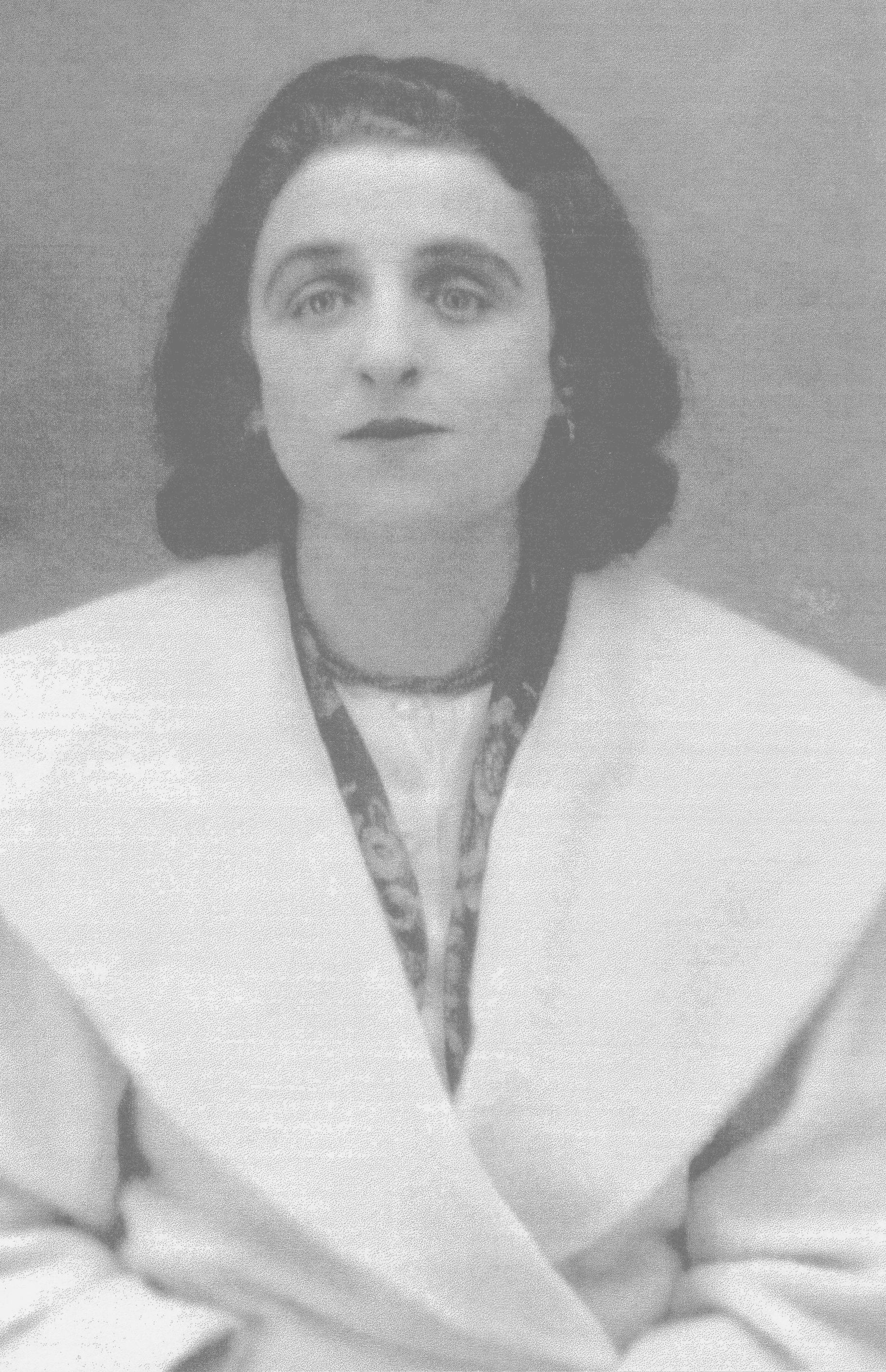
- Riding in January 1924
- Born: Laura Reichenthal; January 16, 1901; New York City, U.S.
- Died: September 2, 1991 (aged 90); Wabasso, Florida, U.S.
- Education: Cornell University
- Occupations: Poet; critic; novelist; essayist; author
- Spouse: Louis R. Gottschalk (married 1920-1925)

Laura Riding Jackson (born Laura Reichenthal; January 16, 1901 – September 2, 1991), best known as Laura Riding, was an American poet, critic, novelist, essayist and short story writer.

== Early life and education ==
She was born in New York City to Nathaniel Reichenthal, a Jewish immigrant from Galicia, and Sadie (née Edersheim), and educated at Cornell University. She met historian Louis R. Gottschalk, then a graduate assistant at Cornell, and they married in 1920.

== Career ==
She began to write poetry, publishing first (1923–26) under the name Laura Riding Gottschalk. She became associated with the Fugitives through Allen Tate, and they published her poems in The Fugitive magazine. They awarded her the Nashville Prize in 1924. Her marriage with Gottschalk ended in divorce in 1925, at the end of which year she went to England at the invitation of Robert Graves and his wife Nancy Nicholson. She would remain in Europe for nearly 14 years.

The excitement stirred by Laura Riding's poems is hinted at in Sonia Raiziss' later description: "When The Fugitive (1922–1925) flashed down the new sky of American poetry, it left a brilliant scatter of names: Ransom, Tate, Warren, Riding, Crane.... Among them, the inner circle and those tangent to it as contributors, there was no one quite like Laura Riding." ("An Appreciation," Chelsea 12 1962, 28.) Riding's first collection of poetry, The Close Chaplet, was published in 1926, and during the following year she assumed the surname Riding. By this time the originality of her poetry was becoming ever more evident: generally she favoured a distinctive form of free verse over conventional metres. She, Robert Graves and Nancy Nicholson lived in London until Riding's suicide attempt in 1929. It is generally agreed that this episode was a major cause of the break-up of Graves's first marriage: the whole affair caused a famous literary scandal.

When Riding met the Irish poet, Geoffrey Phibbs, in 1929, she invited him to join the household that already contained herself, Graves, and Graves's wife, Nancy. Phibbs agreed, but after a few months changed his mind and returned to his wife, referring to Riding as "a virago" in a letter to his friend Thomas MacGreevy. When they failed to effect a reconciliation, he rejoined the household but rejected Laura and moved in with Nancy. This was one of the catalysts for the incident of 27 April 1929, when Riding jumped from a fourth-floor window (or, according to Timothy Sandefur, 2019, “a second-storey window”) at the lodgings she shared with Graves, at the height of an argument involving Graves, Phibbs and Nancy Graves; having failed to stop her, Graves also jumped (from a lower floor), but was unharmed, whilst Riding sustained life-threatening injuries.

Following the break-up with Nancy, until the outbreak of the Spanish Civil War in 1936, Riding and Graves lived in Deià, Mallorca, where they were visited by writers and artists including James Reeves, Norman Cameron, John Aldridge, Len Lye, Jacob Bronowski and Honor Wyatt. The house has become a museum.

Riding and Graves were highly productive from the start of their association, though after they moved to Mallorca they became even more so. While still in London they had set up (1927) the Seizin Press, collaborated on A Survey of Modernist Poetry (1927) (which inspired William Empson to write Seven Types of Ambiguity and was in some respects the seed of the New Criticism), A Pamphlet Against Anthologies (1928) and other works. Progress of Stories (1935) would later be highly esteemed by, among others, John Ashbery and Harry Mathews. In Mallorca, the Seizin Press was enlarged to become a publishing imprint, producing inter alia the substantial hardbound critical magazine Epilogue (1935–1938), edited by Riding with Graves as associate editor.

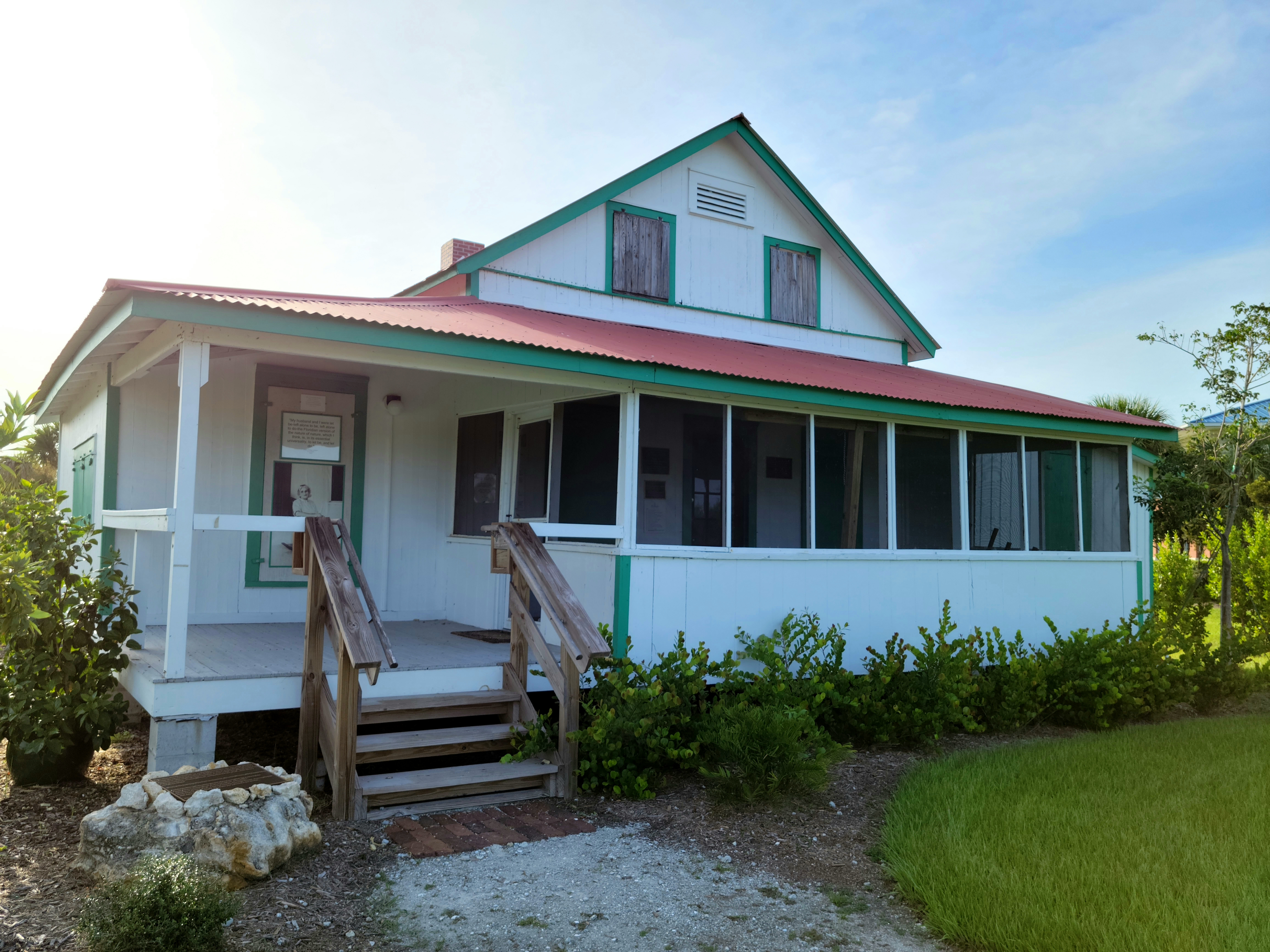
Riding's house, on the Mueller campus of Indian River State College in Vero Beach.

Graves and Riding left Mallorca in 1936, at the outbreak of the Spanish Civil War. Between 1936 and 1939, Riding and Graves lived in England, France and Switzerland. Throughout their association both steadily produced volumes of major poetry, culminating for each with a Collected Poems in 1938. In 1939, they moved to the United States and took lodging in New Hope, Pennsylvania. Their changing relationship is described by Elizabeth Friedmann in A Mannered Grace, by Richard Perceval Graves in Robert Graves: 1927–1940, The Years with Laura and by T. S. Matthews in Jacks or Better (1977; UK edition published as Under the Influence, 1979) and also was the basis for Miranda Seymour's novel The Summer of '39 (1998). In 1939 Riding and Graves parted and in 1941 she married Schuyler B. Jackson, eventually settling in Wabasso, Florida, where she lived quietly and simply until her death in 1991, Schuyler having died in 1968. The vernacular cracker house in which they lived has been renovated and preserved by the Laura Riding Jackson Foundation at the Vero Beach campus of Indian River State College.

According to Graves' biographer Richard Perceval Graves, Riding played a crucial role in the development of Graves' thoughts when writing his book The White Goddess, despite the fact the two were estranged at that point. Riding Jackson later said, "As to the ‘White Goddess’ identity: the White Goddess theme was a spiritually, literarily and scholastically fraudulent improvisation by Robert Graves into the ornate pretentious framework of which he stuffed stolen substance of my writings, and my thought generally, on poetry, woman, cosmic actualities and the history of religious conceptions." She had already written to the Editor of the Minnesota Review, in 1967, about how Graves had used her as a source: "In my thinking, the categorically separated functions termed intellectual, moral, spiritual, emotional, were brought into union, into joint immediacy; other conceptions put the sun and moon in their right rational places as emblems of poetic emotionalism, and lengthened the perspective of Origin back from the skimpy historical heavens of masculine divinity through a spacious dominion of religious symbolism, pre-sided over, for the sake of poetic justice, by a thing I called mother-god."

=== Renunciation of poetry ===
In about 1941, Riding renounced poetry, but it was fifteen to twenty years before she felt able to begin explaining her reasons and exploring her unfolding findings. She withdrew from public literary life, working with Schuyler Jackson on a dictionary (published posthumously in 1997) that would lead them into an exploration of the foundations of meaning and language. In April 1962, she read "Introduction for a Broadcast" for the BBC Third Programme, her first formal statement of her reasons for renouncing poetry (there had been a brief reference book entry in 1955). An expanded version of the piece was published that year in the New York magazine Chelsea, which also published "Further on Poetry" in 1964, writings on the theme of women-and-men in 1965 and 1974 and in 1967, The Telling.

=== Later writings ===
The 62 numbered passages of The Telling, a "personal evangel", formed the "core part" of a book of the same title, thought by some to be her most important book alongside Collected Poems. Writings and publications continued to flow throughout the sixties, seventies and eighties, as Laura (Riding) Jackson (her authorial name from 1963 onwards) explored what she regarded as the truth-potential of language, free from the artificial restrictions of poetic art. "My faith in poetry was at heart a faith in language as the elementary wisdom," she had written in 1976 ("The Road To, In, And Away From, Poetry", Reader 251). Her later writings attest to what she regarded as the truth-potential contained in language and in the human mind. She might be regarded as a spiritual teacher whose unusually high valuation of language, led her to choose literature as the locus of her work. Two issues of Chelsea were given over to new writings by her, It Has Taken Long (1976) and The Sufficient Difference (2001).

She was awarded the Bollingen Prize in 1991.

She died of cardiac arrest on September 2, 1991.

== Reception and legacy ==
Publication of her work has continued since her death in 1991, including First Awakenings (early poems, 1992), Rational Meaning: A New Foundation for the Definition of Words (1997), The Poems of Laura Riding, A Newly Revised Edition of the 1938/1980 Collection (2001), Under the Mind's Watch (2004), The Failure of Poetry, The Promise of Language (2007), and On the Continuing of the Continuing (2008). Trent Editions published a number of her works, beginning with the two-volume edition of her literary memoirs, The Person I Am (2011), following which four early collections of her poetry were edited and re-published with lengthy introductions: The Close Chaplet (1926), Love as Love, Death as Death (1928), Poet: A Lying Word (1933), and Poems: A Joking Word (1930). Ugly Duckling Presse has also re-published some of her work.

Paul Auster in the New York Review of Books called her "an important force of the international avant-garde".

Her poems also had many detractors, such as John Gould Fletcher, William Carlos Williams, Virginia Woolf, Louise Bogan, Dorothy L. Sayers and Dudley Fitts.

Her works have appeared in translation in French, German, Spanish, Danish, Polish, Portuguese and Norwegian (by Terje Dragseth).

== Selected bibliography ==
- The Close Chaplet (London: Hogarth Press, [October] 1926; New York: Adelphi Company, 1926; Nottingham: Trent Editions, 2017; New York: Ugly Duckling, 2020)
- A Survey of Modernist Poetry [with Robert Graves] (London: Heinemann, 1927; New York: Doubleday, 1928)
- Voltaire: A Biographical Fantasy [with foreword, 1921] (London: Hogarth Press, 1927).
- Anarchism Is Not Enough (London: Cape; New York: Doubleday, 1928; new ed. Berkeley CA: University of California Press, 2001)
- Contemporaries and Snobs (London: Cape; New York: Doubleday, 1928)
- A Pamphlet Against Anthologies [with Robert Graves] (London: Cape; New York: Doubleday, 1928)
- Love as Love, Death as Death (Hammersmith/London: Seizin Press, 1928; Nottingham: Trent Editions, 2018)
- Twenty Poems Less (Paris: Hours Press, 1930)
- Poems: A Joking Word [with Preface] (London: Cape, 1930; Nottingham: Trent Editions, 2020)
- Four Unposted Letters to Catherine (Paris: Hours Press, n.d.[1930])
- Experts Are Puzzled (London: Cape, 1930; New York: Ugly Duckling, 2018)
- Though Gently (Deià: Seizin Press, 1930) (reproduced, with responses from commentators and critics, in Delmar 8, Winter 2002)
- Laura and Francisca: A Poem (Deià: Seizin Press, 1931)
- Everybody's Letters (London: Barker, 1933)
- The Life of the Dead [with Ten Illustrations by John Aldridge] (London: Arthur Barker, 1933)
- Poet: A Lying Word (London: Barker, 1933; Nottingham: Trent Editions, 2017)
- Focus I – IV (periodical edited with Robert Graves and others, four vols published, Deià, Mallorca, 1935)
- Progress of Stories (Deià: Seizin Press; London, Constable, 1935; The Dial Press, 1982; Persea, 1994)
- Epilogue: A Critical Summary (periodical edited with Graves)
  - Volume I (Deià: Seizin Press; London: Constable, Autumn 1935)
  - Volume II (Deià: Seizin Press; London: Constable, Summer 1936)
  - Volume III (Deià: Seizin Press; London: Constable, Spring 1937)
  - Volume IV: The World and Ourselves (London: Chatto & Windus, 1938)
- Convalescent Conversations (Deià: Seizin Press, 1936; New York: Ugly Duckling, 2018)
- A Trojan Ending (Deià: Seizin Press; London: Constable, 1937)
- Collected Poems (London: Cassell; New York: Random House, 1938)
- Lives of Wives (London: Cassell, 1939)
- "The Telling" (Chelsea 20/21, May 1967, pp. 114–162). This essay formed the core of The Telling, 185 pp. (London: Athlone, 1972; New York: Harper & Row, 1973; Manchester: Carcanet, 2005)
- Selected Poems: In Five Sets (London: Faber, 1970; New York: Norton, 1973; New York: Persea, 1993)
- It Has Taken Long (Chelsea 35 [whole issue], New York, 1976)
- The Poems of Laura Riding: A New Edition of the 1938 Collection (Manchester: Carcanet; New York: Persea 1980)
- Some Communications of Broad Reference (Northridge, CA: Lord John Press, 1983)
- First Awakenings (Manchester: Carcanet; New York: Persea, 1992)
- The Word 'Woman' and Other Related Writings (New York: Persea, 1993; Manchester: Carcanet, 1994)
- A Selection of the Poems of Laura Riding, edited with an Introduction by Robert Nye (Manchester: Carcanet, 1994; New York: Persea, 1996)
- Rational Meaning: A New Foundation for the Definition of Words, with Schuyler B. Jackson; edited by William Harmon (University Press of Virginia, 1997)
- The Sufficient Difference: A Centenary Celebration of Laura (Riding) Jackson, guest-edited by Elizabeth Friedmann (Chelsea 69 [whole issue], New York, Dec. 2000)
- The Poems of Laura Riding, newly revised edition, edited by Mark Jacobs, note on the text by Alan J. Clark (New York: Persea, 2001)
- Under The Mind's Watch: Concerning Issues Of Language, Literature, Life Of Contemporary Bearing, edited by John Nolan and Alan J. Clark (Oxford: Peter Lang, 2004)
- The Failure of Poetry, The Promise of Language, edited by John Nolan (Ann Arbor: University of Michigan Press, 2007)
- On the Continuing of the Continuing (London: Wyeswood Press, 2008) (fine-printed limited edition)
- The Person I Am, in two volumes, edited by John Nolan and Carroll Ann Friedmann (Nottingham: Trent Editions, 2011)

Translations

- Anatole France at Home, by Marcel Le Goff, translated by Laura Riding Gottschalk (New York: Adelphi, 1926)
- Almost Forgotten Germany, by Georg Schwarz, translated by Laura Riding and Robert Graves (Deià, Mallorca: Seizin Press; London: Constable, 1936)
