= A Glass of Blessings =

1958 novel by Barbara Pym

- First edition
- Author: Barbara Pym
- Language: English
- Publisher: Jonathan Cape
- Publication date: 1958
- Publication place: United Kingdom
- Media type: Print (Hardcover)
- Pages: 255 pp

A Glass of Blessings is a novel by Barbara Pym, first published in 1958. It deals with the growing estrangement of a well-to-do married couple and the means by which harmony is restored.

== Plot summary ==
The central character and narrator, Wilmet Forsyth, is the thirty-three-year-old wife of a civil servant, Rodney, with a comfortable though routine life. She does not need to work and enjoys a life of leisure. When not lunching or shopping she occupies her time, somewhat guiltily, with occasional "good works", particularly at the instigation of Sybil, her slightly eccentric mother-in-law, whose house Wilmet and Rodney share. She becomes drawn into the social life of her church, St Luke's, and there makes a change for the good in the lives of two other characters. The kleptomaniac Wilf Bason has to resign from the government ministry where Rodney works and she arranges for Wilf to become housekeeper at the clergy house, shared by two celibate priests. She also gives support to Mary, a ‘mousy’ worshipper, who goes to live for a trial period in a convent after the death of her mother, but later marries the handsome curate.

After a church service, Wilmet renews acquaintance with her close friend Rowena's attractive but ne'er-do-well brother, Piers Longridge. She and Sybil go to his evening classes in Portuguese. Wilmet develops a romantic interest in Piers, and begins to believe that he is her secret admirer. Wilmet fails to realise that Piers is gay, until she becomes aware of his relationship with Keith, a lower-class young man with a Leicester accent. Keith comes in useful later, helping her to choose furniture after she and Rodney have to find somewhere new to live following Sybil's remarriage. Rodney confesses that he has taken a friend of a colleague, Prudence Bates, out for dinner on a couple of occasions, but there was nothing more than that. The move brings Rodney and Wilmet closer together at the same time as troubles are resolved for some of the other characters.

== Publication history and reception ==
A Glass of Blessings was Pym's fifth novel and was published by Jonathan Cape in 1958. Pym's working title for the novel was The Clergy House. The book received less critical attention than Pym's previous novels, and she noted in a diary entry that none of the reviews was "wholly good". There she was described as "tone-deaf to dialogue" and "moderately amusing". Pym later recalled that - of her first six novels - Glass was the worst reviewed. The novel sold 3,071 copies in its first printing - fewer than any of Pym's previous novels.

The novel was first published in the United States by E.P. Dutton in 1980. The novel was published in Germany in 1995 as Ein Glas voll Segen, in Spain in 2010 as Los hombres de Wilmet, and in Italy in 2012 as Un sacco di benedizioni. In 2012 too, Hachette released the novel as an audiobook.

== Intertextuality ==
Barbara Pym often resorted to various kinds of intertextuality in order to give her novels added depth and relevance. In the case of A Glass of Blessings, the title is taken from a line in George Herbert’s poem "The Pulley", which is quoted and commented on in this novel's final chapter. In the poem, when God first made man and, "having a glass of blessings standing by", all its contents were poured on him except rest, since otherwise he would not appreciate the others with which he was endowed. It is this theme, that a life that does not run smoothly is itself a glass of blessings, that Wilmet has satisfaction in applying to all that has happened to her. There is also an ironical reference back to the source of Wilmet Forsyth's name, which is taken from the heroine of Charlotte M. Yonge's The Pillars of the House. There Yonge's Wilmet Underwood was the mainstay of her family, while the performance of Pym's narrator falls rather short of her achievement.

Another form of intertextuality is the way characters from one Pym novel reappear in another. In his introduction to A Glass of Blessings, John Bayley refers to it as "one of her most engaging devices". Rodney and Wilmet Forsyth had already made a cameo appearance in Jane and Prudence (1953). Now Prudence Bates serves as catalyst to the renewed closeness between Wilmet and Rodney. Prudence is a friend of Eleanor Hitchens (a very minor character in Jane and Prudence), who works in the same ministry as Rodney, and he had taken her out to dinner on two occasions. This prompts Wilmet to admit to previously unmentioned lunches with Rowena's husband Harry and with Piers. Their stiff conversation then dissolves "into helpless laughter, so that an elderly woman, coming into the lounge to retrieve the knitting she had left there before dinner, retreated quickly and with a look of alarm on her face." Wilmet, Piers, and Keith also appear in No Fond Return of Love (1961), when Dulcie Mainwaring and Viola Dace encounter them while visiting the castle in Taviscombe. Julian and Winifred Malory from Excellent Women (1952) are also mentioned in A Glass of Blessings, as well as Rocky Napier, whom both Wilmet and Rowena remember as a love interest during their war service in Italy. Archdeacon Hoccleve from both Pym's debut novel Some Tame Gazelle (1950) and Excellent Women makes an appearance, and Catherine Oliphant from Less than Angels is mentioned. The names of two other characters, Oswald Thames and Wilf Bason, were eventually recycled in A Few Green Leaves (1980).

== Themes ==
Commentators frequently point out that the focus of Barbara Pym's earlier novels is limited to the world of middle class women. Wilmet Forsyth, the narrator in A Glass of Blessings, represents the reasonably affluent end of that microcosm. Without children, with no job or meaningful social function, she is largely cocooned from reality and only comes to an understanding of her situation through exposure to the fascinating Piers and his "slightly common" homosexual partner. Some would regard Pym herself as similarly limited at this stage and judge "the dwindling class relevance of this kind of English social comedy by the way in which Pym was bypassed by [contemporary] literary trends" and lost her publisher soon after. Others see her as objectively ironical and have pointed to the way in which she, in the company of other women novelists of the 1950s, portrays the prop of the social establishment, the Church of England. Unchangeably traditionalist, its supporters remain blind to its growing irrelevance.

Nowhere is Pym's sympathetic permissiveness more clear than in her attitude to homosexuality, particularly in this novel, although, given the time at which it was published, that is usually referred to in oblique and subtle ways. In fact both 'camp' and 'gay' behaviour are described. The former is found Wilf Bason (and possibly some of the clergy), which led a contemporary reviewer in The Daily Telegraph to note how the "queer goings on of male housekeepers are described with catty accuracy". But whereas this behaviour is made the matter of comedy, it is only Wilmet's misunderstanding of the gay relationship between Piers and Keith that is treated as comic. As a novelist, "Pym just seems to see homosexual characters as part of the world, and depicts them as they are, with no fuss." Nor does she present only Piers's domestic relationship; she extends her depiction to the homosexual subculture, as in the scene in the gay coffee-bar, La Cenerentola.

== Adaptations ==
A Glass of Blessings was broadcast by BBC Radio 4 in 1991 in an adaptation by Valerie Windsor, produced by Barbara Pym's sister Hilary and the actress Elizabeth Proud.
