= Excellent Women =

Novel by Barbara Pym

- First edition
- Author: Barbara Pym
- Language: English
- Publisher: Jonathan Cape
- Publication date: 1952
- Publication place: United Kingdom
- Media type: Print (Hardback)
- Pages: 256 p. (hardback edition)

Excellent Women, the second published novel by Barbara Pym, first appeared from Jonathan Cape in 1952. A novel of manners, it is generally acclaimed as her funniest and most successful in that genre.

== Title ==
The phrase "excellent women" appears frequently throughout the novel, and is often used by men in reference to the kind of women who perform small but meaningful duties in the service of churches and voluntary organisations and are taken for granted. The phrase first appears in Pym's early unpublished novel Civil to Strangers and is taken from Jane Austen's novel Sanditon.

== Plot summary ==
The book is a first-person narrative in which Mildred Lathbury records the humdrum details of her everyday life in post-war London near the start of the 1950s. Perpetually self-deprecating, but with the sharpest wit, Mildred is a clergyman's daughter who is now just over thirty and lives in "a shabby part…very much the 'wrong' side of Victoria Station". She works part-time at the charitable Society for Aged Gentlewomen and otherwise occupies herself by attending and helping at the local church. There she is particularly friendly with its unmarried High church priest Julian Malory and his slightly older sister Winifred, who keeps house for him.

Recently Mildred had shared a flat with her schoolteacher friend Dora Caldicote and at one time had been briefly courted by Dora's brother William, with whom she still occasionally keeps in touch. Her rather uneventful life grows more exciting with the arrival of new neighbours in the flat below her, anthropologist Helena Napier and her handsome husband Rocky, to whom Mildred feels herself drawn. However, she is wary of being too taken in by his charm, having learned that while serving in Italy in the Royal Navy, Rocky's principal task had been to look after the welfare of the female auxiliaries known as 'Wrens'.

Helena is not interested in housework and leaves the flat in an untidy state. After his return, Rocky is only a little more house-proud, preferring to go up to Mildred's flat and get her to make him tea. Eventually the ill-matched married couple quarrel when Helena leaves a hot saucepan on a polished walnut table; she storms off to live with her mother and he to stay in a country cottage he owns. Mildred is left to negotiate between them who owns what furniture and eventually helps arrange their reconciliation.

A subplot revolves around the activities of Julian Malory, who accepts Allegra Gray, a glamorous clergyman's widow, as a tenant for the flat in his vicarage. After Julian eventually becomes engaged to Allegra, she attempts to ease Julian's sister out of the house. Winifred then flees weeping to Mildred and asks if she can stay with her. Julian follows her closely, having quarrelled with Allegra over her behaviour. The engagement is broken off and Allegra leaves for the more upmarket area of Kensington. Winifred confesses that she had always hoped that Mildred would marry Julian so that they could all live together, but obviously that has now become impossible.

Throughout these events, Mildred wryly observes the ups and downs of matrimony, offering a ready ear to the participants and wondering whether she would be happy left completely on the shelf. When attending a meeting of Helena Napier's 'Learned Society' (which is never specified), Mildred had met Helena's supposed alternative love interest, fellow anthropologist Everard Bone, who is definitely wary of becoming entangled with a married woman and at one point flees to the north to pursue his interest in prehistory. Subsequently he seems more impressed by Mildred than she is by him as he pursues her with phone calls and invitations to dinner. By the end of the novel, however, Mildred reluctantly agrees to play the 'excellent woman' in Everard’s life, to the extent of proof-reading his learned papers and helping index them.

== Publication history ==
Barbara Pym originally outlined the novel in one of her notebooks, where it is headed "A full life", the phrase on which the book's eventual final chapter closes. Another partial draft was begun in February 1949, this time headed "No life of one's own", which relates to Mildred's reflections on how others perceive spinsterhood. There is also a note that "the time the novel begins is February 1946", which explains the emphasis on immediately post-war drabness.

Pym completed the novel in February 1951 and it appeared the following year from Jonathan Cape, which had published her previous Some Tame Gazelle, as was noted on its cover. The book was well received, with plaudits which included the Church Times comparing her writing to Jane Austen's, while John Betjeman, in his review for The Daily Telegraph, praised its humour. The novel sold 6,577 copies in Great Britain by the end of the 1950s, far outselling her other novels, although by no means a bestseller.

By 1954, Pym wrote that eight American publishers and 10 publishers from Continental Europe had seen the manuscript and declined to publish it. Indeed, Excellent Women had to wait until E.P. Dutton published it in the US in 1978. The novelist John Updike, reviewing it then, wrote that:

Excellent Women... is a startling reminder that solitude may be chosen, and that a lively, full novel can be constructed entirely within the precincts of that regressive virtue: feminine patience.

Translations into European languages began soon after, with the Dutch Geweldige Vrouwen in 1980, followed by a Spanish translation in 1985, an Italian in the same year, and a German in 1988. The French translation of 1990 not only changes the title to Des Femmes Remarquables but is reported to lack much of the novel's wit. Excellent Women was later translated into such languages as Russian, Estonian, Icelandic, Turkish and Persian.

== Analysis ==
Excellent Women has been noted for its accurate analysis of life in post-war England, where rationing and other shortages were still in effect. Pym was drawing on her own life for some elements of the novel. It is the first of many to feature anthropologists and she had worked at the International African Institute in London since 1946, at the period she is describing. Previously she had been an officer in the WRNS in Italy during World War II and no doubt had come across Rocky Napier's equivalent then.

The novel's humour is achieved through linguistic as well as situational means. Very often the serious is juxtaposed to the bathetic in a style similar to mock-heroic. Thus Mildred reflects, "I know myself to be capable of dealing with most of the stock situations or even the great moments of life – birth, marriage, death, the successful jumble sale, the garden fete spoiled by bad weather". This mood is prolonged by Mildred's absorption in mundane detail, as in her first meeting with Helena by the dustbins in the basement, where they make arrangements for managing the supply of toilet rolls in the shared bathroom, followed by Mildred's squeamishness at having such matters discussed where others might hear.

But behind the humour, there is a darker mood, expressed by one critic as "the world of vague longing… described in this novel in a way which not only shows us the poignancy of such hopes, but allows us to smile at them". Philip Larkin, a long-time admirer of Pym's writing, also noted this in a 14 July 1964 letter, having just re-read Excellent Women and remarking that the novel was "better than I remembered it, full of a harsh kind of suffering [-] it's a study of the pain of being single,- time and again one senses not only that Mildred is suffering but that nobody can see why she shouldn't suffer, like a Victorian cabhorse." Later, in a letter of 1971, he enthused: "what a marvellous set of characters it contains! My only criticism is that Mildred is a tiny bit too humble at times, but perhaps she's satirising herself. I never see any Rockys, but almost every young academic wife ('I'm a shit') has something of Helena."

== Adaptations ==
The novel was serialised as a radio play in the 1950s on the BBC Woman's Hour.

Excellent Women was serialised in 10 parts on BBC Radio 4's Books at Bedtime programme, at the start of 2002.

== Connections to other Pym novels ==
Barbara Pym's characters often reappear or are referenced in later novels. In Jane and Prudence (1953), one of the characters mentions that "nice Miss Lathbury" has married an anthropologist (presumably Everard). In Less than Angels (1955), Everard reappears as a character, described as "having married a rather dull woman who was nevertheless a great help to him in his work; as a clergyman's daughter she naturally got on very well with the missionaries that they were meeting now that they were in Africa again." Later Pym writes "Everard's wife Mildred would do the typing". Bone appears finally in An Unsuitable Attachment in which he attends a dinner party while his wife, Mildred, is at home sick.

This novel also introduces Everard Bone's assistant Esther Clovis, who will feature in the novels Less Than Angels and An Unsuitable Attachment, and whose funeral service will appear from different perspectives in both An Academic Question and A Few Green Leaves. The character of Archdeacon Hoccleve in Excellent Women had previously played a larger role in Pym's first novel, Some Tame Gazelle.
