= Some Tame Gazelle =

1950 novel by Barbara Pym

- First edition
- Author: Barbara Pym
- Language: English
- Genre: Comedy
- Publisher: Jonathan Cape
- Publication date: 1950 (1st edition)
- Publication place: United Kingdom
- Media type: Print (hardbound)
- Pages: 252 (1st edition)
- OCLC: 7094635

Some Tame Gazelle is Barbara Pym's first novel, originally published in 1950.

The title of the book is taken from the poem "Something to Love" by Thomas Haynes Bayly, and the work of other English poets is frequently referenced during the course of the story. Started soon after Pym's period of study at Oxford University, it contains many sly references to those she knew there.

== Plot ==
The novel details episodes in the life of Belinda Bede, a spinster in her fifties who shares a house with her younger, more dominant sister Harriet, who is also unmarried. Belinda has loved the village's Archdeacon Hoccleve since they were at university together, but he had preferred to marry the better-connected Agatha, a bishop's daughter. Harriet has an admirer in the village, the Italian Count Ricardo Bianco, who regularly proposes marriage to her, but her preference has always been to look after the welfare of young curates.

As the story begins, the village has a new curate, Mr Donne. Agatha leaves for a visit to a German spa, and another of Belinda's and the Archdeacon's student acquaintances comes to stay at the vicarage. This is Dr Parnell, now head of the main university library, who is accompanied by his assistant, the socially suspect Mr Mold. Before leaving, Mr Mold proposes marriage to Harriet and, refused, takes it calmly by visiting the local pub and counting himself well escaped.

When Agatha returns, she brings with her Dr Grote, the colonial bishop of Mbawawa, who had been a protégé of Harriet's when he was a curate. Belinda begins to see in him another threat to her peaceful coexistence with her sister, but it is to herself that the bishop proposes. When he too is rejected, he proposes to Connie Aspinall, a decayed gentlewoman living in the village, and is accepted.

Harmony returns to the disrupted community with the marriage of Mr Donne and Olivia Berridge, an academic specialising in Middle English literature and a niece of Agatha Hoccleve, and their subsequent departure. As life returns to normal, a new curate arrives to claim Harriet's attention, while Belinda finds "such consolation as she needed in our greater English poets", gardening and good works.

== Publication history ==
Pym started to write Some Tame Gazelle in 1934, shortly after completing her studies at St Hilda's College, Oxford. The novel was rejected by several publishers, including Jonathan Cape and Gollancz. Cape expressed interest in Pym's writing, however, and encouraged her to make some alterations to the text and consider re-submitting. Pym's friend, the up-and-coming literary critic Robert Liddell, provided detailed criticism of the novel to assist with edits.

World War II interrupted Pym's budding literary career, and she finally revised the novel to the point where it was accepted by Cape in 1950. The novel sold 3,544 copies in Great Britain by the end of the 1950s, which was not a bestselling figure but was reasonable for a debut novel. Among alternative titles that Pym considered were Some Sad Turtle and The Well Tam'd Heart.

The novel was first published in the United States by E.P. Dutton in 1983. In 2012, it was released as an audiobook by Hachette. Some Tame Gazelle was published in Italy as Qualcuno da amare (Someone to love) and in France as Comme une gazelle apprivoisée (Like a tamed gazelle).

== Reception ==
The novel received several positive reviews. The Manchester Guardian called it "an enchanting book about village life", and Antonia White reviewed the novel for the New Statesman thus:

(Pym) keeps her design so perfectly to scale, and places one mild tint in such happy juxtaposition to another that this reader ... derived considerable pleasure from it.

It has been considered a remarkable first novel, because of the way in which the youthful Pym — who began the book when she was 21 — imagined herself into the situation of a middle-aged spinster, living with her sister in the country. The poet Philip Larkin regarded Some Tame Gazelle as Pym's Pride and Prejudice

== Characters ==
Two months after she had begun work on the first draft in 1934, Barbara Pym noted in her diary that "Some time in July I began writing a story about Hilary and me as spinsters of fiftyish. Henry, Jock and all of us appeared in it." There exists a first edition of its much edited final version annotated in the author's hand with a pencilled list identifying the characters based on her friends and associates. A later scholar has therefore drawn the conclusion that originally Some Tame Gazelle "was to be a roman à clef for her particular circle".

Besides herself and her sister Hilary, who are the characters Belinda and Harriet Bede, many others with whom Barbara Pym had associated at Oxford were included, sometimes under revealing names. Henry Harvey, her (and Belinda's) abiding love interest, is transformed into Archdeacon Hoccleve; the Archdeacon's wife Agatha is identified not with the woman who became Henry's first wife (whom he had not yet met), but with Alison West-Watson, a more successful girlfriend than was Barbara. Three of the characters were based on former librarians at the Bodleian at one time or another, although the library itself is never identified by name in the novel. Principal among them was Robert Liddell, nicknamed "Jock" as in the diary entry, who is Dr Nicholas Parnell, the former university friend who comes to stay with the Archdeacon. The other two librarians were Count Roberto Weiss and John Barnicot, who become the novel's Count Ricardo Bianco and his dead friend John Akenside. Two more women also had real-life counterparts. Edith Liversidge was based on Honor Tracy, once Liddell's love interest, and Lady Clara Boulding has been identified with Lady Julia Pakenham, a daughter of the 5th Earl of Longford.

Throughout her life, Barbara Pym kept records of unusual names, such as a cathedral organist named A. Surplice. As a roman à clef, Some Tame Gazelle provided a framework for incorporating these naming references. For instance, the Bede sisters—characters who observe minor village events such as the departure of the vicar's wife from behind bedroom curtains—share their surname with the ecclesiastical historian the Venerable Bede. Similarly, Dr. Theo Grote, a character who delivers slide lectures on the Mbawawa people, shares his surname with George Grote, author of History of Greece.

Then, in a novel where so much is made of "our greater poets", the characters bear the name of several. The Augustan poets Thomas Parnell and Matthew Prior give their names to the librarian Dr Parnell and the dressmaker Miss Prior. Other 18th-century literary names include Akenside, that of the Count's letter-writing friend, and Piozzi, which was the name given to the Count in Pym's original manuscript before the editors at Cape made her change it. Edgar Donne, who pronounces his name as Don, is embarrassed by the Archdeacon's insistence that it should be pronounced, like the poet John Donne’s, as Dunne. The Archdeacon himself also has a poet's name, that of Thomas Chaucer's disciple Thomas Hoccleve, and quotes John Gower and Chaucer to an uncomprehending congregation in his sermons. The humour is underlined by the fact that both his wife and her niece are more erudite students of Middle English literature.

Pym's characters sometimes recur in minor roles in later novels. Archdeacon Hoccleve features in Excellent Women and A Glass of Blessings. Harriet Bede reappears in An Unsuitable Attachment, which also includes the report of Count Bianco's death.

== Adaptation ==
Some Tame Gazelle was adapted as a radio play by BBC Radio 4 in 1995 with Miriam Margolyes as Harriet and Hannah Gordon as Belinda.

== Bibliography ==
- Yvonne Cocking, Who’s Who in Some Tame Gazelle (2016)
