= Less than Angels =

1955 novel by Barbara Pym

Less Than Angels
- First edition
- Author: Barbara Pym
- Language: English
- Publisher: Jonathan Cape
- Publication date: 1955
- Publication place: United Kingdom
- Media type: Print (Hardback)
- Pages: 254 pp (hardback edition)

Less Than Angels is a novel by Barbara Pym, first published in 1955.

== Synopsis ==
Catherine Oliphant is a writer of magazine stories and articles who lives with anthropologist Tom Mallow. Tom begins a romance with a student, Deirdre Swan, and moves out of Catherine's flat. At the same time, she becomes interested in reclusive anthropologist Alaric Lydgate, who has recently returned from Africa and lives next-door to Deirdre and her family.

A sub-plot involves the activities of Deirdre's fellow-students Mark and Digby, and their attempts to curry favour with influential academics as they seek grants to facilitate the next phase of their careers. Tom departs for Africa, where he is killed during a time of political unrest. Deirdre begins to return Digby's fondness for her, and Catherine seems about to begin a relationship with Alaric.

== Publication history ==
Less Than Angels was Pym's fourth novel and was published by Jonathan Cape in October 1955. It received muted reviews, in contrast to the success of her first two novels in particular. The novel's 1955 sales totalled 3,092 copies, which the publisher commented "isn't good enough". By the end of the decade, it had sold only 3,569 copies. The book did not lose money for the publisher but was not considered a success.

Less Than Angels was the only Pym novel to be published in the United States before the 1970s. It was published by The Vanguard Press in April 1957, selling 1,386 copies, which was considered a failure. The novel was republished in the United States by E.P. Dutton in 1980, alongside the rest of Pym's canon.

In the 1980s, the novel was released as an audiobook by Chivers Press read by the actress Joanna David. In 2013, Hachette released the novel as an audiobook, narrated by Patience Tomlinson. The novel was published in Spain as Un poco menos que ángeles, Italy as Un po' meno che angeli and in France as Moins que les anges

== Analysis ==
Less Than Angels is set in a period of social change which is subtly represented within the novel's plot and setting. Pym sought to precisely describe life in post-war England, with life slowly returning to normal but the impacts of rationing and great loss of life still evident.

The novel is largely concerned with the activities of a group of anthropologists, and is to some extent based on the author's own experiences working at the International African Institute in London. Pym wrote, "It is surely appropriate that anthropologists, who spend their time studying life and behaviour in various societies should be studied in their turn".

The central character, Catherine, is considered by many to represent the author, being a writer of short stories who observes the actions of other characters with an air of detachment. Anne Wyatt-Brown writes that "Catherine represents Pym’s view of the world. She shares her author’s imagination, her amused reaction to anthropologists, and her detachment."

== Connections to other novels ==
Several characters from Pym's earlier novel Excellent Women reappear, including Mildred Lathbury, Rocky Napier, Everard Bone, and Esther Clovis. Catherine Oliphant, Less Than Angels' central character, will be mentioned in Pym's A Glass of Blessings, as a writer. In No Fond Return of Love we learn that Deirdre did indeed marry Digby.

== Adaptation ==
Less Than Angels was the first Pym novel to be considered for a film adaptation, with Twentieth Century Fox showing some interest in the 1950s. However, nothing came of this.
