= Jane and Prudence =

1953 novel by Barbara Pym

- First edition
- Author: Barbara Pym
- Language: English
- Publisher: Jonathan Cape
- Publication date: 1953
- Publication place: United Kingdom
- Media type: Print (Hardback)
- Pages: 222 pp (hardback edition)
- ISBN: 978-1-84408-449-4
- OCLC: 166627476

Jane and Prudence is the third novel by Barbara Pym, first published in 1953.

== Plot summary ==
Jane Cleveland, aged 41, is married to a clergyman who has recently taken on a new parish in an English village. Their daughter Flora is to follow in her mother's footsteps in the autumn by studying English at the same Oxford college. Jane's friend and former student Prudence Bates, aged 29, lives in London. She is famous for her love affairs but currently has an imponderable attraction to Arthur Grampian, her older, married boss, the head of an unspecified academic foundation. Jane would like to see Prudence married, and thinks she has found a suitable candidate in Fabian Driver, a handsome, fortyish widower who lives in the village and is known to have been habitually unfaithful to his late wife. She invites Prudence to stay for a weekend, knowing that she will meet Fabian at a village event. Prudence and Fabian begin to see each other in London and the romance seems to be going well.

There is, however, competition for Fabian: his next-door neighbours are the domineering Miss Doggett and her paid companion Jessie Morrow, who has long loved him and seeks escape from her lowly situation. One evening, Jessie pays him an unannounced visit and they are soon pursuing a clandestine relationship on her evenings off.

Prudence visits the Clevelands again, at the same time as Flora and her undergraduate boyfriend Paul. Fabian greets her enthusiastically when he comes to dinner at the vicarage, but does not seek any time with her alone during the rest of her time there, so the weekend is a disappointing one for Prudence.

Matters come to a head when Miss Doggett guesses that there is something between Fabian and Jessie and tells Jane of her suspicions; they find the pair at Fabian's house and they confirm that they are to be married. Jane offers to write to Prudence, and Fabian says he will too.

Prudence is very upset: she is not used to being rejected. She is consoled to some extent by the attentions and friendship of a colleague, Geoffrey Manifold, whom she had previously not had much time for but whose kindness she now recognises. At the end of the book Arthur Grampian finally asks her to have dinner with him; she turns him down as she is going out with Geoffrey, but life seems full of promise again.

== Publication history and reception ==
Jane and Prudence was Pym's third novel, published by Jonathan Cape in 1953. Whereas Pym's first two novels had been successful, this received more mixed reviews. Literary figures Lady Cynthia Asquith and Lord David Cecil both championed the novel, but The Guardian felt it was "a horrid disappointment after Excellent Women" and the Times Literary Supplement remarked that the plot was "not easy to recall after one has closed the book". The novelist Jilly Cooper regards Jane and Prudence as Pym's finest work - "full of wit, plotting, characterization and miraculous observation". Throughout her life, Pym remained unhappy with the novel, commenting several times in her diary that she had not emphasised the "town and country" differences between the lives of the protagonists more effectively

The novel did not sell particularly well; the initial bookshop orders from Cape totalled 2,300 and the publisher had sold 5,052 copies by the end of the 1950s. This meant that the book had made money, but was not a bestseller. Pym reported in 1954 that the publishers could attract no interest from American or Continental publishers. The book was first published in the United States in 1981, after Pym's death.

The novel was released as an audiobook by Hachette in 2011, read by Maggie Mash.

== Characters ==
- Jane Cleveland, a good-hearted vicar's wife, aged 41
- Nicholas Cleveland, her mild-mannered husband
- Flora Cleveland, their daughter
- Paul, Flora's boyfriend
- Prudence Bates, aged 29, a beautiful and elegant spinster
- Fabian Driver, a vain and self-obsessed widower
- Miss Doggett, a tyrannical old lady
- Miss Morrow, her outwardly meek but calculating companion
- Arthur Grampian, the director of the institution where Prudence works
- Geoffrey Manifold, an academic working at the same institution
- other office workers at the institution
- Edward Lyall, the MP of the constituency in which the village is situated
- Mrs Lyall, his mother
- people living in the village and active in the church

== Adaptations ==
Jane and Prudence was adapted for radio by Hilary Pym and Elizabeth Proud in 1993, with Julian Glover, Elizabeth Spriggs, Samantha Bond and Penelope Wilton among the cast.

A second radio adaptation was broadcast in 2008, written by Jennifer Howarth. Penelope Wilton was the narrator, Emma Fielding played Prudence and Susie Blake Jane. Miss Doggett was played by Elizabeth Spriggs.

== Connections to other novels ==
Characters in Pym novels often reappear or are referenced in later works. The characters of Miss Morrow and Miss Doggett had originally appeared in an early unpublished work from 1940, Crampton Hodnet, which would be published after Pym's death. The character of Miss Morrow is distinctly different in Jane and Prudence, as is that of Barbara Bird, also re-used from Crampton Hodnet.

The character of William Caldicote, from Pym's previous novel Excellent Women, appears very briefly late in this volume. Miss Doggett reports that Mildred Lathbury from the same novel married the anthropologist Everard Bone.
