= Hazel Holt =

British novelist (1928–2015)

Hazel Holt (née Young; 3 September 1928 – 23 November 2015) was a British novelist.

She studied at King Edward VI High School for Girls in Birmingham, England, and then Newnham College, Cambridge. She went on to work at the International African Institute in London, where she became acquainted with the novelist Barbara Pym, whose biography she later wrote. She also finished one of Pym's novels after Pym died. Holt wrote My Dear Charlotte, a story that uses the actual language of Jane Austen's letters to her sister Cassandra to construct a Regency murder mystery.

Holt wrote her first novel in her sixties, and was a leading crime novelist. She is best known for her Sheila Malory series. She was also a regular contributor to The Stage for some years. She married Geoffrey Louis Holt (1924–2010) in 1951. Their son, Tom Holt is a novelist.

== Bibliography ==
- A Lot To Ask: A Life of Barbara Pym (1990)
- My Dear Charlotte (2010)

=== Sheila Malory ===
1. Gone Away [US title Mrs Malory Investigates] (1989)
2. The Cruellest Month (1991)
3. The Shortest Journey (1992)
4. An Uncertain Death (1993)
5. Murder on Campus (1994)
6. Superfluous Death (1995)
7. Death of a Dean (1996)
8. The Only Good Lawyer... (1997)
9. Dead and Buried (1998)
10. Fatal Legacy (1999)
11. Lilies That Fester (2000)
12. Leonora (2002)
13. Delay of Execution (2001)
14. Death in Practice (2003)
15. The Silent Killer (2004)
16. No Cure for Death (2005)
17. Death in the Family (2006)
18. A Time to Die (2008)
19. Mrs. Malory and Any Man's Death (2009)
20. Mrs. Malory and a Necessary End (2012)
21. Death is a Word (2014)
