= Bullers Wood School =

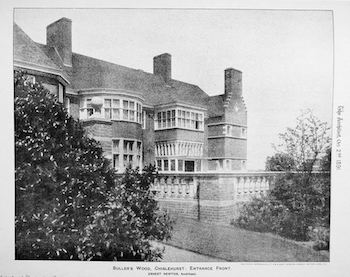
- 1891 image of Bullers Wood School

Location
- St Nicolas Lane, Logs Hill; Bickley, Chislehurst, Greater London, BR7 5LJ; England; 51°24′36″N 0°02′46″E

Information
- Type: Academy
- Motto: Quod Potes Tenta
- Established: c. 1940
- Department for Education URN: 136709 Tables
- Ofsted: Reports
- Headteacher: Simon Hardwick
- Gender: Girls
- Age: 11 to 18
- Enrolment: 1462
- Website: http://www.bwsgirls.org/

Bullers Wood School is a comprehensive girls' school with a mixed Sixth Form academy school located on St Nicolas Lane in Chislehurst, part of the London Borough of Bromley. It is a member of the Bullers Wood Multi Academy Trust, along with Bullers Wood School for Boys.

== Admissions ==
The school accepts girls only until the Sixth Form, when boys are admitted. As of 2021, enrollment included 1514 girls and 59 boys. The school's motto is Quod Potes Tenta, which is translated, "Strive To Your Utmost". It is situated just north of Chislehurst Road (B264), halfway (east-west) between Bromley and Chislehurst.

== History ==
Bullers Wood facilities are a combination of several refurbished historical houses and modern additions. Named after an ancient forest, the original Bullers Wood house was built in the 1860s and was owned by the Sanderson family from the 1870s. Scotsman John Sanderson, who had made his money sheep farming in Australia, employed local architect Ernest Newton (1856–1922) to extend the house in 1889.

=== County council control ===
From 1929 to 1939, the site hosted Sir Sydney Nicholson's Royal School of Church Music, with the school's chapel being the present library. At the beginning of the second World War, the site was bought by Kent County Council and used by the Auxiliary Fire Service.

=== Technical and grammar school ===
During the Second World War it was transformed into a secondary school. A V-1 flying bomb hit the Bromley Day Commercial School for Girls on Wharton Street in Bromley, so it moved to the Bullers Wood site. It became Bromley Girls' Technical High School for ages 14–17, and after buildings were added, it became Bromley Technical High School for Girls for ages 11–18. It was known as Bromley Technical School for Girls by 1958, before becoming Bromley Technical High School for Girls.

In 1968, it became a grammar school as Bullers Wood School under Kent Education Committee.

=== Comprehensive ===
In April 1974 it came under Bromley borough control. It became a grant-maintained school in 1991. In 1990 it had around 1000 girls. In 1991, after raising money from parents, it bought the £65,000 La Serronnerie study centre in deepest Normandy, which was used for week-long visits via Dieppe. The head teacher at the time was Barbara Vanderstock. The house had room for 14 girls at a time.

=== Academy ===
On 1 May 2011, Bullers Wood School gained academy status, marking the end of its control by Bromley borough.

In 2015, Bullers Wood made plans to open a boys' school to accommodate 900 pupils in Bromley. Bullers Wood Boys School had been approved in 2018 by the Bromley council, but the council reversed its decision after reconsidering the impact it would have on traffic. Bullers Wood School for Boys did open in September 2018, with plans to complete a main school building at Chislehurst Road in 2021.

== Achievements ==
In 2011 Ofsted described the school as "outstanding", and noted that it held Healthy Schools, Artsmark Gold and Consultant School accreditation. In 2024 it was rated "good".

== Facilities and involvement in the community ==
The school's grounds cover 22 acres. A sports field with a pavilion is approximately a quarter mile from the school grounds, and a netball court is next to the school pond, as well as a gym, a sports hall, an assembly hall.

== Sixth form ==
The school has a mixed sixth form open to both Bullers' girls and external students. The sixth-form centre is based in Inglewood. Here students have access to a kitchen with cooking appliances and computer rooms. Common rooms are available for both Year 12 and 13 students and a media suite can be found in the attic.

== Notable former pupils ==
- Ruthie Henshall, theatre actress
- Theresa Lola, poet and writer
- Judy Oakes, shot putter, powerlifter, and weightlifter
- Zoë Tapper, actress
- Kirsty Woodward, actress
