= Clarence Rook =

British writer and journalist

Clarence Rook (1862/3–1915) was a British writer and journalist, known for his short, witty sketches of late Victorian and Edwardian London.

== Life ==
Rook was born in Faversham, Kent, as the son of bookseller and postmaster Henry John Rook.

Rook studied at Oriel College, Oxford, from 1881 to 1886. He was in Bristol as a civil service examination tutor in 1891.

He married Clara Wright in September 1893. The marriage certificate gives his profession as journalist. He became a fairly successful London journalist in the 1890s, writing for The Globe with E. V. Lucas, contributing to the "By the Way" column, The Daily Chronicle with Henry Nevinson, where he founded the "Office Window" column, The Illustrated London News, The Idler, The Ludgate Monthly, The Art Journal. He became known in London's literary circles and was strongly praised by George Bernard Shaw. He was befriended by Louis Frederic Austin, and was a member of the Argonaut's Club, a literary society whose other members included Rudolph Lehman, Florence Marryat, Bernard Partridge, John Alfred Spender, George Paston and William Henry Wilkins.

He rose to fame with his novel on working-class life in the East End of London, The Night of the Hooligan, published in 1899. The book purports to be a factual report on the London underworld, but contemporary reviewers were skeptical. Rook claims that the protagonist, named Alf, was introduced to him by publisher Grant Richards. Richards's autobiographical notes seem to confirm this, but it is possible that Richards was writing to perpetuate the literary fiction of Rook. Green (1979) in the introduction to the OUP edition, in any case, points out some possible fictional sources for episodes in the book. Rook also placed some of the characters of The Hooligan Nights in a clearly fictional story called "The Stakes" published in Pall Mall Magazine in 1900.

Rook also wrote a detective-story, The Stir Outside The Café Royal, published in the September 1898 edition of The Harmsworth Magazine. He visited St Louis in 1904, a trip he wrote about in a piece with the title "American Manners" in 1906. He visited Gran Canaria in 1909. His 1907 book on Switzerland is a serious study of the Swiss national character and republican institutions.

Rook retired from writing early and unexpectedly. Green (1915) suggests that he had disappeared suddenly and without leaving a trace, and indeed Rook's early retirement and death and his comparatively small body of work has left him far more obscure than his contemporaries of the literary establishment of Edwardian London such as George Gissing, Rudyard Kipling, Arthur Morrison or Walter Besant. Rook died after prolonged illness in December 1915. His death certificate suggests that he had suffered from locomotor ataxia, a symptom of advanced stage syphilis, for the last 26 years. He left his wife the sum of GBP 1300 (about GBP 130,000 in 2019 money).

== Bibliography ==
- 1896, George Bernard Shaw
- 1898, The Stir Outside The Café Royal
- 1899, The Hooligan Nights: Being the Life and Opinions of a Young and Impertinent Criminal Recounted by Himself and Set Forth by Clarence Rook, reprinted 1901, 1906, 1907, 1908, 1910; Oxford Paperbacks, with an introduction by Benny Green (1979)
- 1900, A Lesson for Life
- 1907, Switzerland; the Country and its People, with illustrations by Effie Jardine (1857 – c. 1931)
- 1908, London Side-Lights
