= A History of Everyday Things in England =

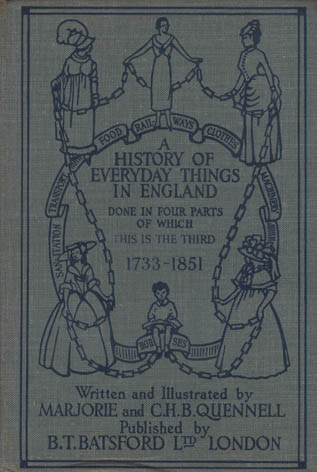
- Cover page, illustration by Marjorie Quennell
- Author: Marjorie Quennell and C. H. B. Quennell
- Publication date: January 1, 1918

A History of Everyday Things in England is a series of four history books for children written by Marjorie Quennell and her husband Charles Henry Bourne Quennell (aka C. H. B.) between 1918 and 1934. The books concern English history between 1066 and 1914. The series has been in print as late as year 2000, although they generally went out of print after the 1960s. Marjorie did many of the illustrations.

Little or no scholarly research has been done about the Quennells, but as Tony Woolrich writes:

[The books] sold in thousands and were reputed to have been used by more than eight hundred schools in Britain alone and more were in use in overseas in English-speaking schools. Translations of a number of titles have been made into Russian, French, German, Italian, Dutch, Swedish and Danish. The books were illustrated with some coloured drawings of mostly costume, half tones and a profusion of line drawings made by the authors. All the books went into numerous revisions, with the information upgraded to take account of modern knowledge.

The books were especially strong on housing, agriculture and the way people earned their livings. They were described by Hector Bolitho as “transforming teaching”. In an era when history focused on the Great Man and political forces as the drivers of history, these books about the day to day life of the common person were ahead of their time, which would not come into the fore until the 1970s (see microhistory).

In 1935 the Quennell's published The Good New Days (1935), where modern industrial and agricultural processes, together with the problems of the future, were considered. In 1968 author S. E. Ellacott published a fifth volume titled A History of Everyday Things in England: Volume V: 1914-1968. They had three children, including a son Peter Courtney Quennell (1905–1993) who became a well-known writer and was editor of History Today. He maintained the family tradition, editing an updated set of 'everyday histories' under the general title of the "English Life" series during the 1960s.

== Volumes ==
First editions listed. Many other editions have been printed that collect some or all of the below into a single volume. Originally intended to be in two parts running until 1799, a further two were produced bringing 'The Industrial Age' back to 1733, and the fourth volume running until the outbreak of the First World War.

- Marjorie & C. H. B. Quennell, A History of Everyday Things in England, London, B. T. Batsford Ltd, 1918-1934
  - Volume I 1066-1449 (1918)
  - Volume II 1500-1799 (1919)
  - Volume III 1733-1851 (1933)
  - Volume IV 1852-1914 (1934)
