= Bickley =

District of south east London, England

Coordinates: 51.4003°N 0.0466°E

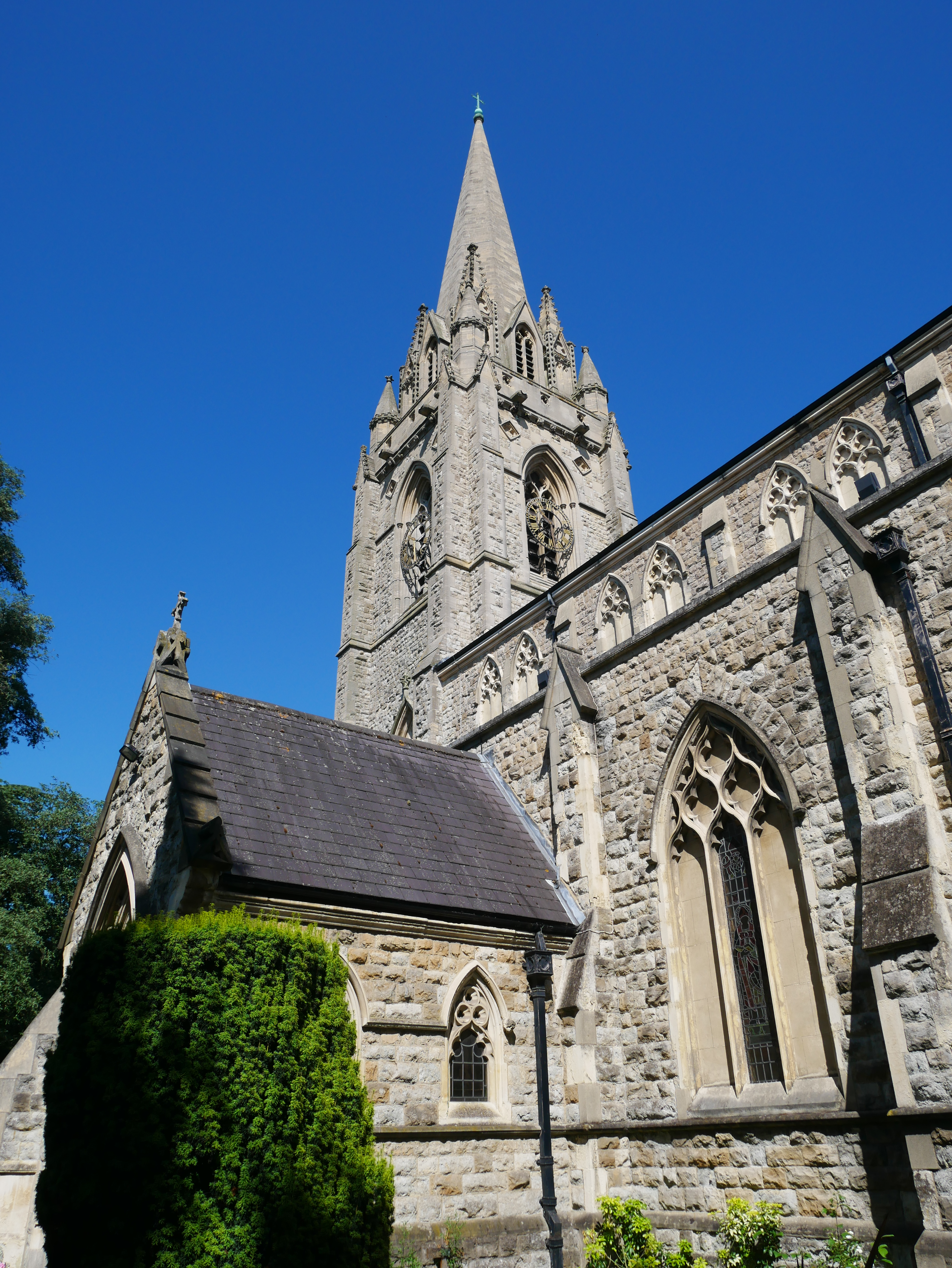
- The Church of Saint George in Bickley

- Location within Greater London
- Population: 13,904 (ward, 2001 Census); 15,098 (2011 Census. Ward)
- OS grid reference: TQ423688
- London borough: Bromley
- Ceremonial county: Greater London
- Region: London
- Country: England
- Sovereign state: United Kingdom
- Post town: BROMLEY
- Postcode district: BR1, BR2
- Dialling code: 020
- Police: Metropolitan
- Fire: London
- Ambulance: London
- UK Parliament: Bromley & Biggin Hill
- London Assembly: Bexley and Bromley

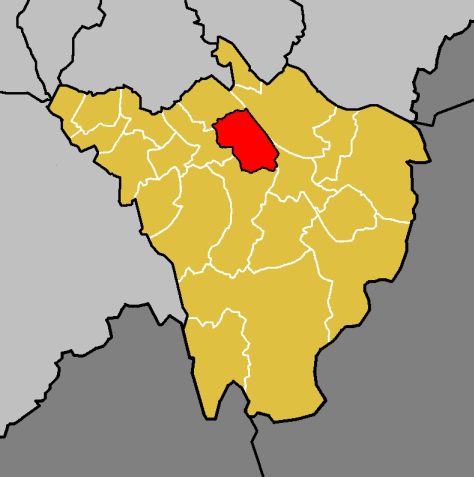
The ward of Bickley (red) shown within the London Borough of Bromley (orange)

Bickley is a district and a local government electoral ward in South East London, within the London Borough of Bromley. It is located 10.4 miles (16.7 km) south east of Charing Cross, bordering Elmstead to the north, Chislehurst to the north-east and east, Petts Wood to the south-east, Southborough to the south, Bromley to the south-west and west and Widmore to the north-west. Until 1965, it was in the historic county of Kent.

== History ==
The area's name is first recorded in 1279, the 'ley' or 'lea' referring to a forest clearing, and 'Bicca' either meaning a pointed ridge, or else a personal name. The area remained rural, save for a small hunting lodge belonging to the Wells family dating to 1759. The Lodge was gradually enlarged to become Bickley Hall, a classical house designed by Robert Mylne, FRS, for John Wells, shipbuilder, in 1780 (demolished 1963). His brother William, shipbuilder and a director of Greenwich Hospital, inherited the estate, and his son John commissioned additions by Robert Smirke in 1810. John Wells began selling part of his lands in 1841 following due to financial difficulties, and by the late 1850s a few large houses had been built in the area, aided by the opening of Bickley railway station (formerly named Southborough Road) in 1858 and Chislehurst station in 1865. Much of the area was purchased and developed by George Wythes, who commissioned numerous large houses for the wealthy classes, most of them designed by Richard Norman Shaw and Ernest Newton. St George's Church was built in 1865, and a cricket ground in 1868. Smaller-scale development continued throughout the early 20th century and several of the older, larger properties were demolished or sub-divided. The area today remains a wealthy one, characterised by large detached housing.

== Parks in Bickley ==
=== Jubilee Country Park ===
With entrances in Thornet Wood Road and Blackbrook lane, there are 62 acres (25 hectares) of wildflower meadows, hedgerows and semi-natural ancient woodland. There is a cycle route through this park to Petts Wood. The London LOOP footpath also goes through Jubilee Park and it is linked to National Trust countryside at Petts Wood and beyond that to Scadbury Park Nature Reserve.

=== Whitehall Recreation Ground ===
A large play area on Southlands Road with a children's playground.

=== Widmore Recreation Ground ===
A small local park with a children's playground which has entrances in Pembroke Road, Lewes Road and Tylney Road.

== Education ==
Schools in Bickley

- Bickley Park (Independent)
- Bickley Primary School
- Breaside Preparatory School (Independent)
- Bromley High School (Independent)
- Bullers Wood School for Boys
- Scotts Park Primary
- St. George's Bickley Primary

== Transport ==
Bickley station serves the area with services to London Victoria, Kentish Town, Orpington and Sevenoaks via Swanley. Bickley is also served by several Transport for London buses, connecting it with areas including Beckenham, Bexleyheath, Bromley, Catford, Chislehurst, Eltham, Locksbottom, Orpington, Petts Wood and Sidcup.

== Politics and government ==
Bickley is part of the Bickley and Sundridge ward for elections to Bromley London Borough Council. It is currently represented by MP Peter Fortune of the Conservative Party, as well as Conservative Councillors Colin Smith, Kate Lymer and Mark Brock.

== Places of worship ==
- St George's Church
- St. Augustine's Church
- Southborough Lane Baptist Church

== Notable residents ==
- David Bowie (1947-2016), musician, lived at 106 Canon Road from 1953 to 1954.
- Colin Cowdrey, Baron Cowdrey of Tonbridge (1932–2000) Cricket player, lived on Hawthorne Road until about 1965.
- Florence Farr (1860–1917), religious writer and playwright, was born in Bickley.
- Norman Fulton (1909–1980), composer, lived in Bickley.
- Evelyn Hellicar (1862–1929), architect.
- Gertrude Hermes (1901–1983) wood engraver, print maker and sculptor, born in Bickley.
- Ethel Hurlbatt, principal of Bedford College, London, born in Bickley.
- Pixie Lott (born 1991), singer-songwriter, spent part of her childhood in Bickley.
- Ernest Newton (1856–1921), architect who designed many houses in the area.
- Charles Henry Bourne Quennell (1872–1935), architect of the Bickley development and writer, lived at 9 The Avenue.
- Marjorie Quennell née Courtnay (1884–1972), artist, writer and museum curator, wife of CHB Quennell.
- Peter Quennell (1905–1993), biographer, literary historian, editor, essayist, poet, and critic, son of CHB Quennell.
- John Wells (1761–1846), of Bickley Hall, High Sheriff of Kent. MP for Maidstone.

== Gallery ==
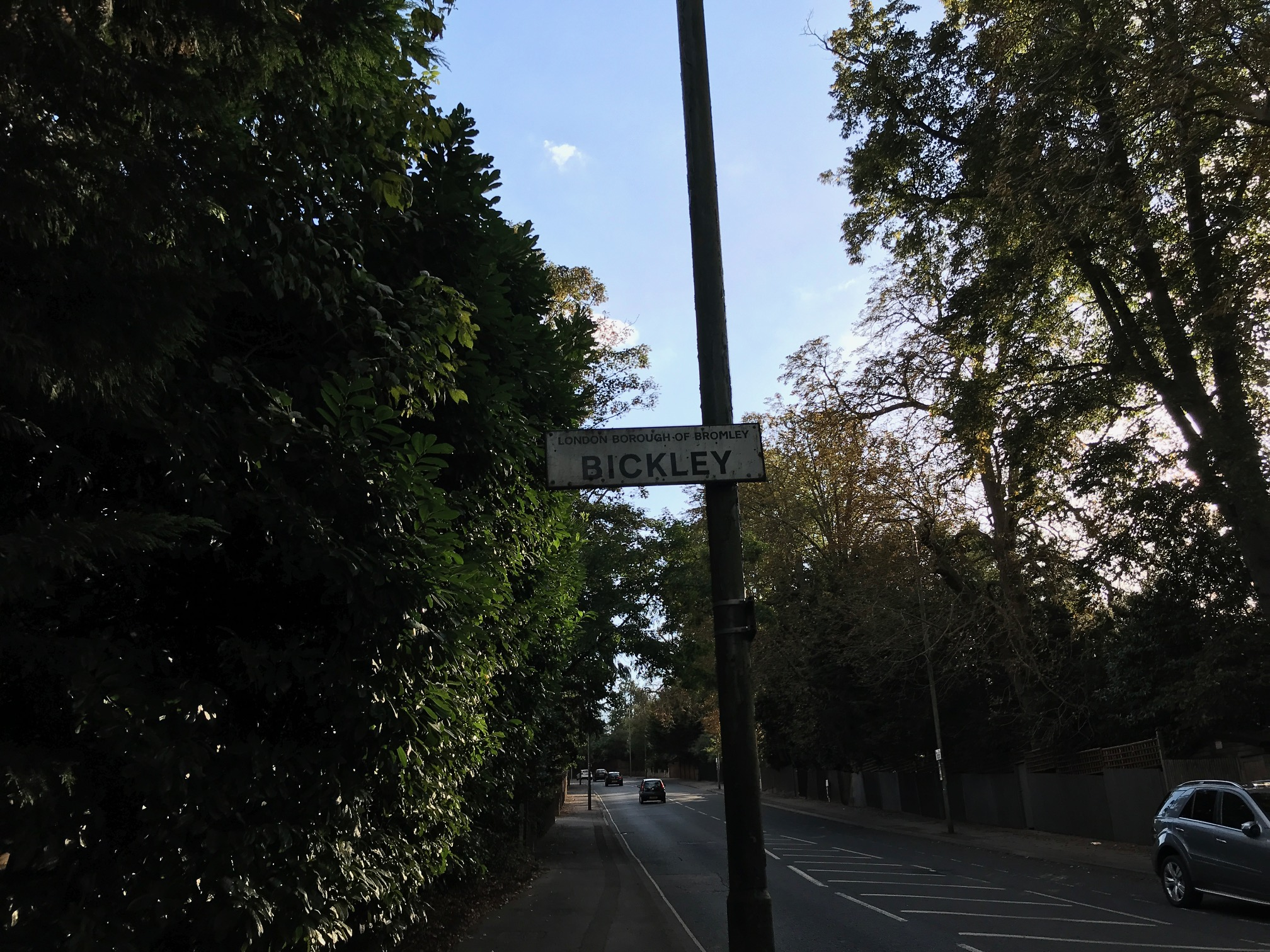
Bickley sign on Bickley Park Road

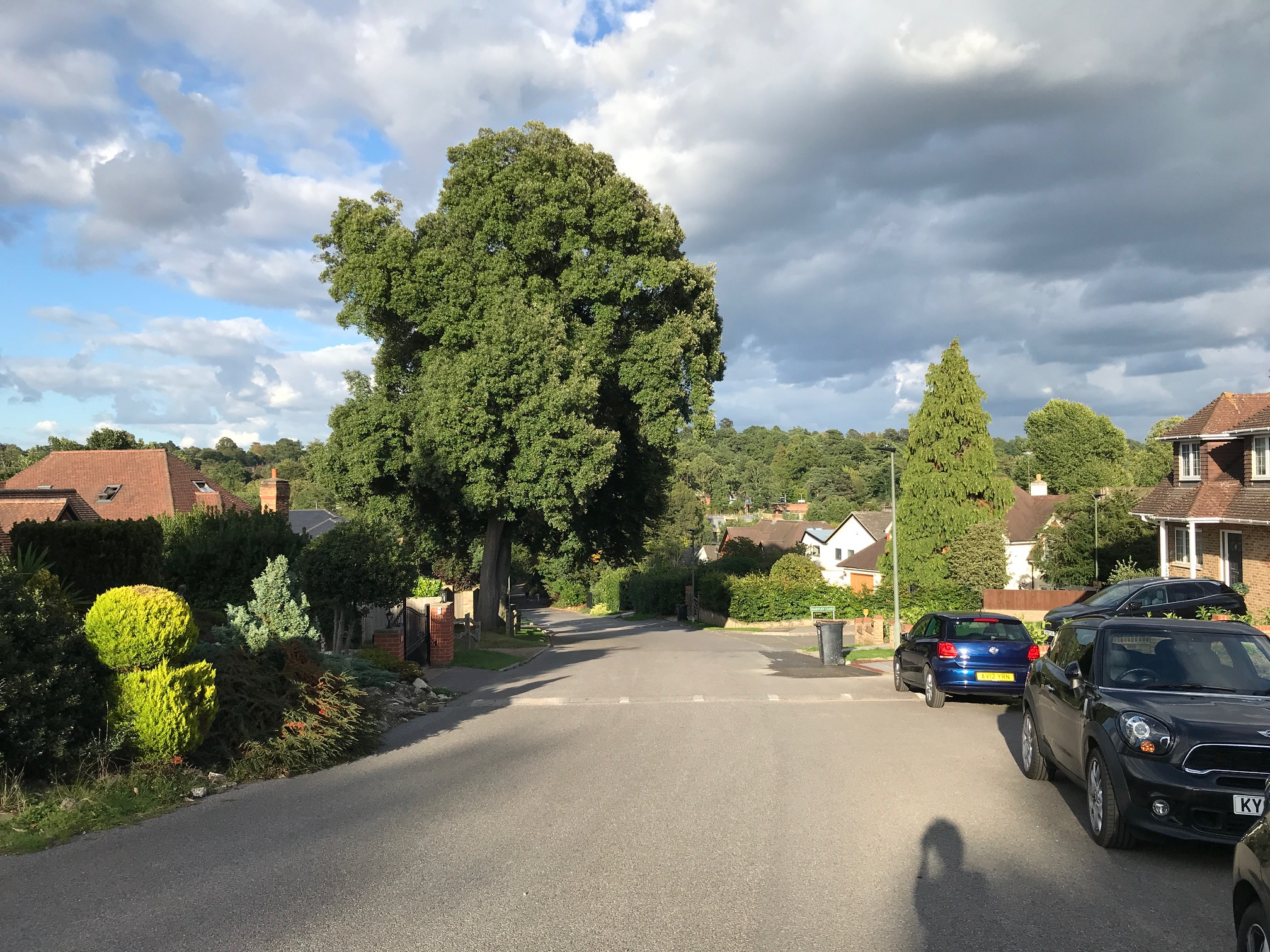
Woodlands Road, lined by substantial detached properties

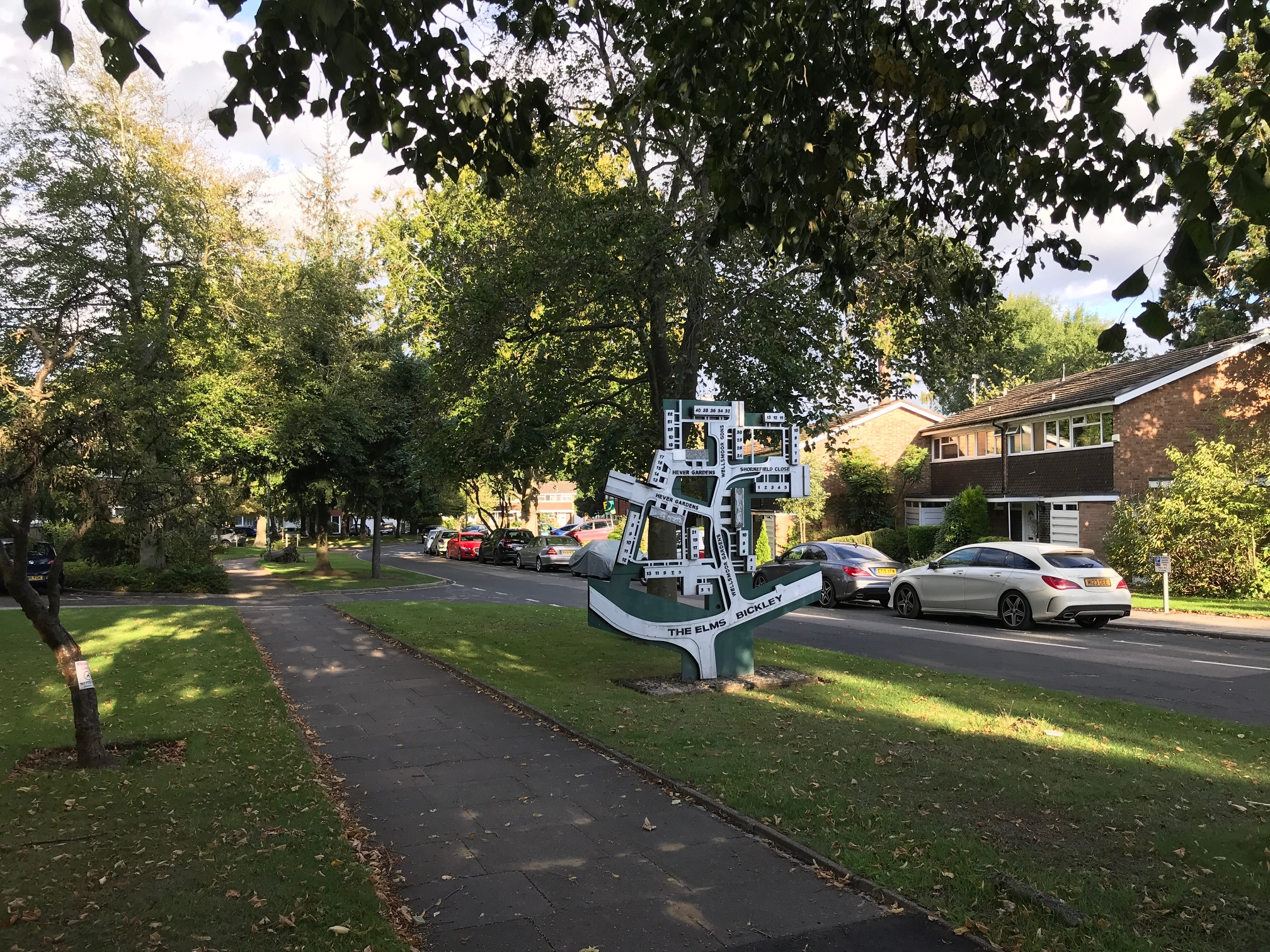
The Elms, Bickley

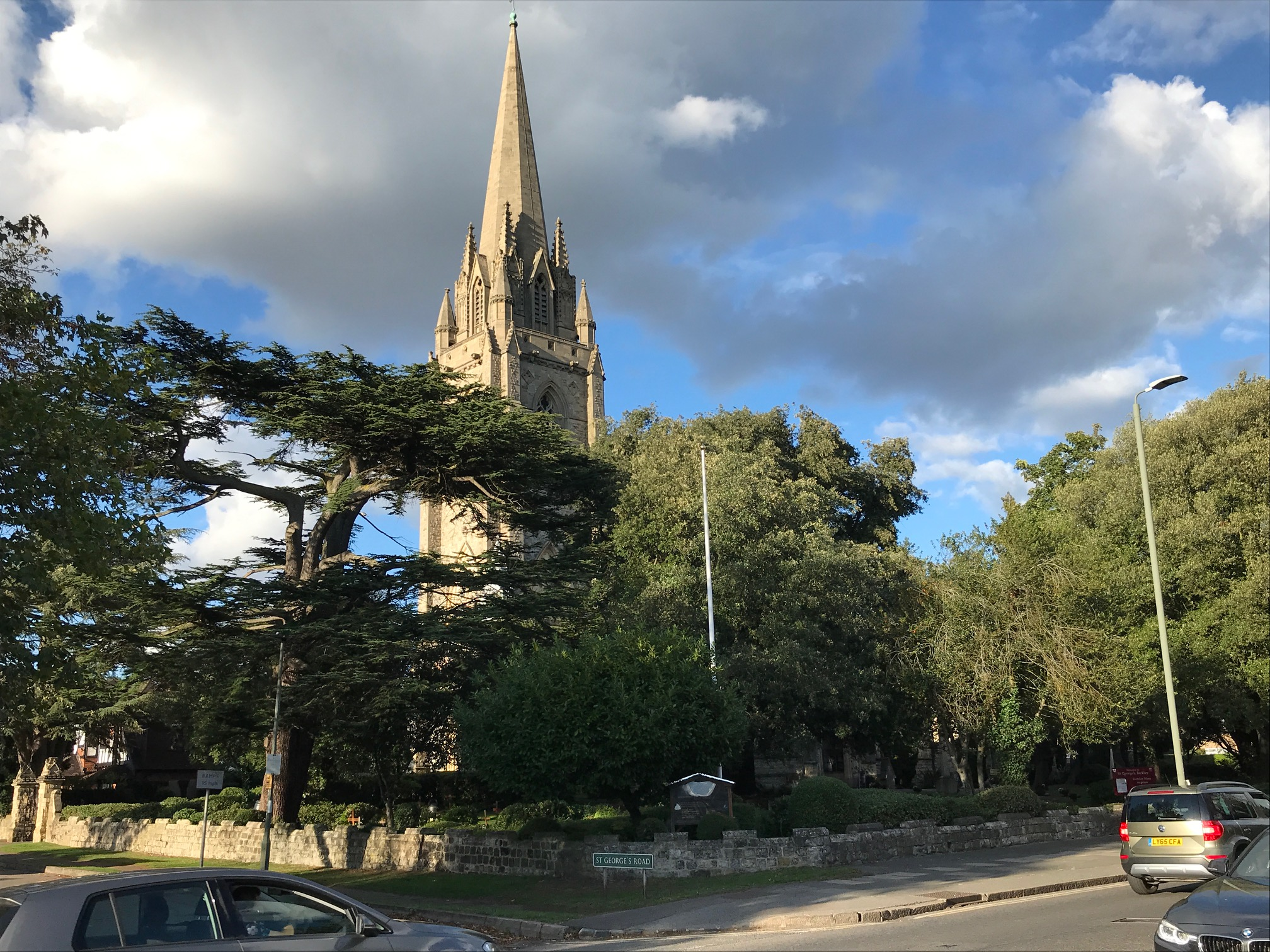
The grade II listed St George's Church, built 1863-65 (with the spire rebuilt in 1905-06)

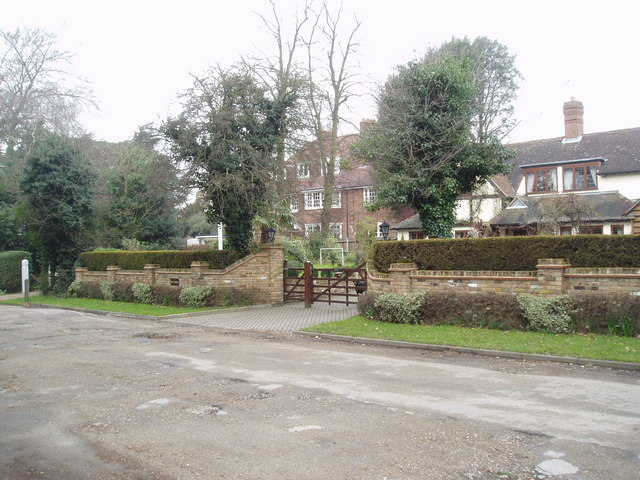
A typical house in the area

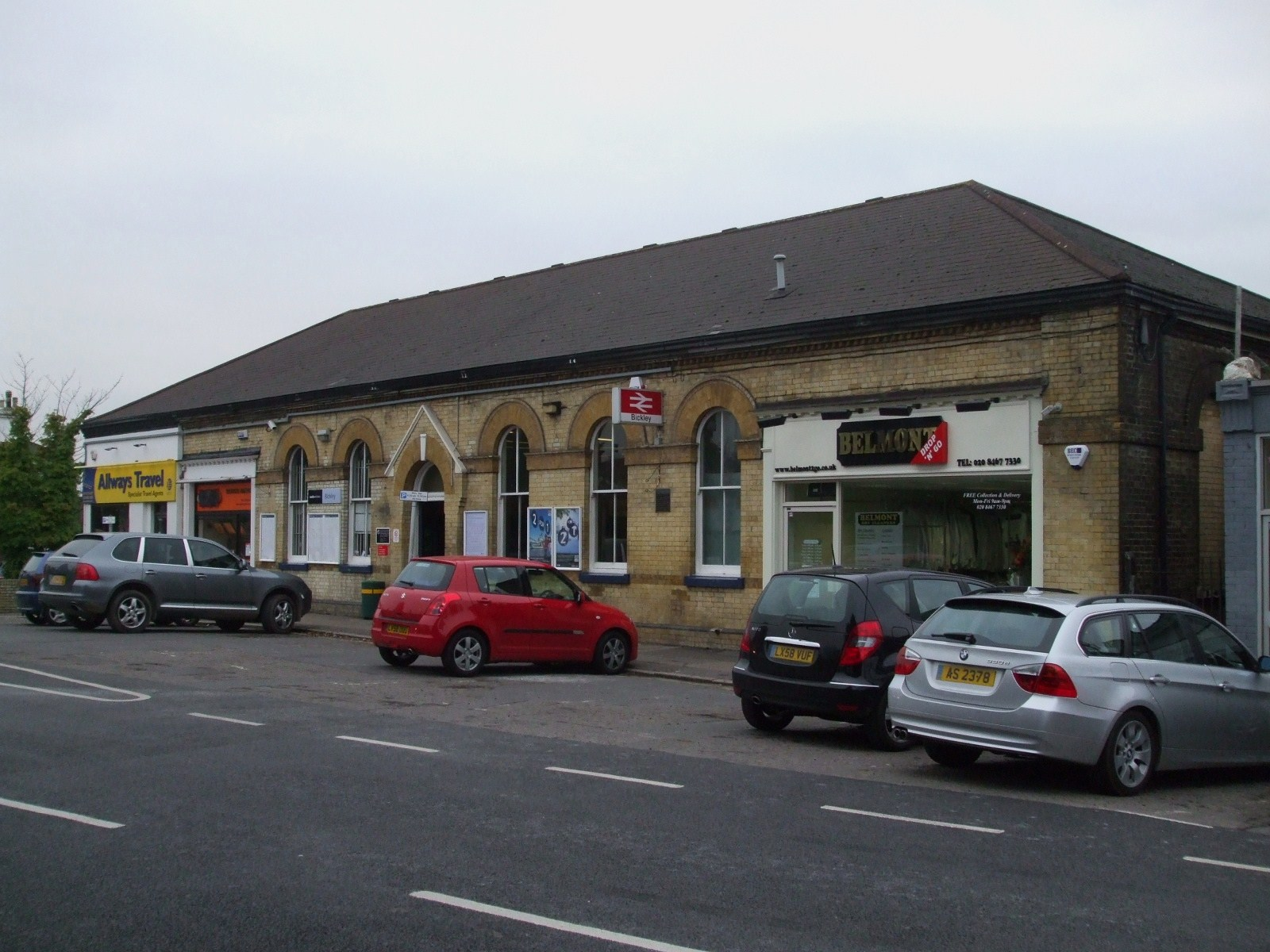
Bickley rail station
