= Alan Hodge =

English historian and journalist (1915–1979)

- Born: 16 October 1915 (age 110); Scarborough, Yorkshire, England
- Died: 25 May 1979 (aged 63)
- Education: Oriel College, Oxford
- Known for: Historian and journalist

Alan Hodge (16 October 1915 – 25 May 1979) was an English historian and journalist. He was a member of the circle of writers and artists that centred on Laura Riding and Robert Graves in the late 1930s, and later collaborated with Graves on The Long Week-End, a social history of Britain in the interwar period, and The Reader Over Your Shoulder, a guide to writing English prose. After the Second World War he worked as the general editor of Hamish Hamilton's Novel Library, as an editorial assistant on Winston Churchill's History of the English-Speaking Peoples, and as a founding co-editor (with Peter Quennell) of the successful magazine History Today.

== Parentage and education ==
Alan Hodge was born on 16 October 1915 in Scarborough, Yorkshire; his father was T. S. Hodge, a Cunard Line captain and officer in the Royal Naval Reserve. He grew up in Liverpool and attended Liverpool Collegiate School before going up to Oriel College, Oxford, where he read history. In his spare time he wrote poetry and, with Kenneth Allott, co-edited the Oxford University English Club's magazine, Programme.

== The Riding-Graves circle ==
In 1935 Hodge, then in his second year at Oriel, wrote a review of the first volume of Epilogue, an irregular critical journal, which led to a correspondence with its editor, the American poet Laura Riding. Riding invited Hodge to visit her at the house in Majorca she shared with Robert Graves, and Hodge duly turned up in time for Christmas. He made an excellent impression; Graves noted in his diary, "Hodge very decent & sensible", and described him as "young, blonde good head". Another description of his appearance a year or so later described him as "a small blond boy with a cherubic soprano's face, an incongruously deep and hollow voice, and a deliberate, sententious manner; he seemed about sixteen". Hodge went home in early January 1936, but returned the following July to spend the summer holidays there. He was kept busy helping with a planned series of schoolbooks, contributing to Epilogue, and writing poems. During July, the Spanish Civil War broke out, and on 2 August, acting on official advice, the entire household left Majorca aboard a British destroyer.

Hodge settled in London with his new girlfriend Beryl Pritchard, a PPE student he had met at Oxford, but remained a part of the circle of writers and artists dominated by Laura Riding. Before long, he decided to return to Spain to work for the beleaguered Socialist government, despite himself being a lifelong Conservative, but Riding told him he must stay in England. Hodge, who was becoming her closest disciple, acquiesced. At this time, he was working on a novel called A Year of Damage, based on his experiences with a former girlfriend, Audrey Beecham, and by the spring of 1937 it was completed. Graves and Riding supervised its progress closely and made many suggestions for its improvement, all of which he adopted, but though both of them loved the finished book Hodge wouldn't publish it, and destroyed the manuscript. In the second half of 1937, he used his skills as a historical researcher to help Graves with the writing of Count Belisarius, a novel set in the early Byzantine Empire; and at about the same time they worked on a historical survey of the influence of politics on literature, eventually published in Harry Kemp and Laura Riding's book The Left Heresy in Literature and Life. These were only the first results of a fruitful partnership between the two friends.

== First marriage ==
On 29 January 1938, Hodge and Beryl Pritchard were married. Beryl had previously doubted it was a good idea, but Hodge won her round; Beryl's parents were less amenable, her father being rude to Hodge at the wedding, and her mother telling her she was throwing her life away. In June Riding, Graves, the Hodges and two more of the coterie travelled to Rennes in Brittany and found a large country house, which they rented and moved into. A year later, the entire party took ship for America, where an old friend of Graves, the journalist Tom Matthews, had engaged to find them a home. The atmosphere in the new community became increasingly claustrophobic and nightmarish as Riding's domination grew more oppressive, and in a few months the group broke up. Hodge, utterly disillusioned with Riding, returned to England with Graves in August, Beryl being expected to follow shortly after. By now the dynamic of the Hodge marriage had completely changed, both coming to suspect that theirs was more a friendship than a romance, while Beryl and Graves had gradually fallen in love with each other. On arriving in England, Hodge immediately set out on a journalistic assignment to Poland, and was in Warsaw when the German army invaded the country. He managed to return to England by a circuitous journey via Estonia, Finland, Sweden and Norway. Beryl reached England from America in October and moved in with Graves, a situation which Hodge, after some initial resistance, accepted without ill-feeling. Beryl remained with Graves for the rest of his life, while Hodge kept his close friendship with both.

== Collaborations with Robert Graves ==
Hodge now resumed his literary partnership with Graves, beginning with some historical research on the American War of Independence for Graves's Sergeant Lamb novels. The next project, The Long Week-End, was intended as "a reliable record of what took place, of a forgettable sort, during the twenty-one-year interval between the two great European wars", for which Hodge did research work and wrote first drafts of several of the chapters. The evidence was mainly drawn from ephemeral sources, such as newspapers, magazines and radio broadcasts, and the book depicted British life in this period as being mainly devoted to frivolities and distractions. The Long Week-End was completed in June 1940 and published the following November by Faber and Faber, with Graves and Hodge being credited as co-authors. There have been many subsequent editions in Britain and the United States, it has been translated into Danish and Swedish and even published in Braille. On its first publication the reaction of academe was mixed. One historian detected the malign influence of the Mass-Observation movement in the authors' approach, and called it "a strange unfocused photograph of the times, in which, although the 'camera-eye' has not lied, it has failed entirely to introduce any perspective or integration", but the sociologist Alfred McClung Lee thought it "regrettable that so few books do so well the useful task Graves and Hodge assigned themselves". Press reviews had some very enthusiastic things to say: "thoroughly good reading", "swift, ironic, entertaining...fair and penetrating and a thoroughly significant book today", "it could hardly have been better done". More recently, it has been described as "stimulating and well-informed", and by Francis Wheen as "enthralling", while for the historian Alfred F. Havighurst "nothing has as yet replaced" it as a social history of the period.

By August 1940, the two were working together on what Graves called a "new book about English prose...for the general reader, and also for intelligent colleges and VI-forms". Originally intended to help Graves's daughter Jenny Nicholson, it was eventually published as The Reader Over Your Shoulder: A Handbook for Writers of English Prose. Its plan, which owes something to Riding's 1938 work The World and Ourselves, is as follows: first come chapters entitled "The Peculiar Qualities of English", "The Present Confusion of English Prose", "Where Is Good English to Be Found?", and "The Use and Abuse of Official English"; then a history of English prose, quoting many examples; then chapters on "The Principles of Clear Statement" and "The Graces of Prose"; finally, taking up the greater part of the book, the authors present under the title "Examinations and Fair Copies" fifty-four stylistically aberrant passages by well-known writers, analyze their faults, and rewrite them in better English. This last section, according to the academic Denis Donoghue, "accounted for much of the fame and nearly all of the delight that the book has given its readers". Getting copyright waivers from each of the 54 writers made demands on the co-authors' time, and since this section was, in Graves's words, "dynamite under so many chairs", also on their diplomacy. Their private nickname for the book was A Short Cut to Unpopularity. The publishers Faber and Faber initially accepted the book while it was still in progress, but later took fright and dropped it; it was finally published in May 1943 by Jonathan Cape. There have been several later editions, some at full length and some drastically abridged. G. W. Stonier, reviewing The Reader Over Your Shoulder in the New Statesman and Nation, regretted that "a book, whose general aims are admirable, should be spoilt so often by its pedantry", but most other contemporary reviews were favourable: "it might seem that The Reader Over Your Shoulder would be unavoidably dry on questions of punctuation and grammar, but even here it is witty and stimulating — a desk-book for the writer that should never fail to key him up", "a stimulating and stirring book, which meets a great and genuine need of our times", "instructive and entertaining book", "highly pleasurable and in some degree profitable", "any editor of [this journal] would mortgage the office filing cabinet to place this book before the eyes of every contributor". The Spectator wryly noted that "this book, with its high standards, its scholarship and its brilliance, is exactly calculated to suit the contemporary taste for spiced and potted knowledge which it deplores". Evelyn Waugh wrote in The Tablet: "This is the century of the common man; let him write as he speaks and let him speak as he pleases. This is the deleterious opinion to which The Reader Over Your Shoulder provides a welcome corrective"; he ended, "as a result of having read [it]...I have taken about three times as long to write this review as is normal, and still dread committing it to print". It has been highly praised in the years since. For the sociologist C. Wright Mills it was "the best book I know" on writing, for the academic Greg Myers, "relentlessly prescriptive and hilarious", for the journalist Mark Halperin "one of the three or four books on usage that deserve a place on the same shelf as Fowler". The biographer Miranda Seymour said that "as a handbook to style, it has never been bettered", and the literary critic Denis Donoghue wrote, "I don't know any other book in which expository prose is read so seriously, carefully, helpfully. For this reason the book is just as important as I. A. Richards' Practical Criticism". He went on, "there is no point in being scandalized by the assumption in The Reader Over Your Shoulder that good English is the sort of English written by Graves and Hodge. In my opinion, that claim is justified."

By 1941, another project was in the offing, alongside The Reader Over Your Shoulder. This was intended as a volume of new poems by Hodge, Graves, James Reeves, Norman Cameron and Harry Kemp, all of whom were veterans of the Laura Riding circle. In the event the publisher, Hogarth Press, rejected Reeves and Kemp from this line-up, so when the book appeared in March 1942 it included 17 poems by Hodge alongside contributions by Graves and Cameron, "published under a single cover for economy and friendship", as the Authors' Note says. The Times Literary Supplement thought Hodge's poems showed "an ironic humour...enriched by a spontaneous vivacity and a sympathetic closeness to nature".

One more book was to have been a collaboration between Graves and Hodge. This was eventually published under Graves's name alone as The White Goddess: A Historical Grammar of Poetic Myth. Hodge retired from the project at a fairly early stage, in 1943, as it became clear that this would be a very personal view of the nature of poetic inspiration and would go beyond his own areas of expertise. Of the central thesis of the book Hodge wrote: "I think it is a good myth, that is, it has truth, and it is not necessary to ask whether it is entirely factually true". They would not produce another book together again, and Graves began to recede from the foreground of Hodge's life.

== Civil Service and journalism ==
Hodge spent the Second World War at the Ministry of Information, where he served first under Sir Harold Nicolson, then as Assistant Private Secretary to his successor, Brendan Bracken. In 1944 he added to his workload by taking a job as book-reviewer to the London local paper, the Evening Standard. After the 1945 general election Bracken was out of office, and Hodge left with him, but when Bracken took on a gossip column called "Men and Matters" at the Financial Times in 1946 he appointed Hodge his assistant. According to Hodge's later description of his role as Bracken's literary catalyst he would be "asked to produce a list of targets for attack. Invariably these were shot down by Bracken in withering terms. This was part of a process of warming up by which he got into his stride". Not everyone reacted well to this kind of treatment – his civil servants cheered when he departed in 1945, and he is rumoured to have been in some respects the model for Orwell's Big Brother – but the relationship with Hodge was different, Bracken having a genuine fondness for him as well as a respect for his scholarship.

== Publishing ==
From 1946 to 1952 Hodge worked for the publishing firm Hamish Hamilton as the general editor of their Novel Library, a series of reprints of classic novels, both English and foreign. The introductions with which Hodge furnished some of the volumes won the admiration of Raymond Chandler, who wrote to the publisher, "Your man Hodge is a superb editor, the rarest kind of mind...Surely no one could write better introductions". The series was eventually wrapped up, but Novel Library editions are now much sought after in secondhand bookshops. He also produced for Hamish Hamilton two translations from the French, Maigret's Mistake by Georges Simenon (later reprinted by Penguin) and Caves of Adventure by Haroun Tazieff.

== Life as a working historian ==
The last 28 years of Hodge's life were dominated by his work on the magazine History Today. This was the creation of Brendan Bracken, Hodge's old boss and from 1945 Chairman of the Financial News group which owned the Financial Times. One of his projects was the creation of a monthly history magazine to be edited by Hodge, but when in 1950 he decided to act on this plan he brought in the literary biographer Peter Quennell as well, making the two men co-editors. Paper-rationing delayed the magazine's launch, but on 12 January 1951 the first issue appeared. History Today (the title was allegedly suggested by Winston Churchill) was attractively illustrated and aimed itself at the general reader without writing down to him. The intention, as A. L. Rowse later wrote, was to "bridge the gap between specialist journals, all too often unreadable by the general public, and the intelligent reader who wanted to read history". From the outset, the magazine brought in a wide range of heavyweight academic historians to contribute articles, the first two issues alone boasting the names of G. M. Trevelyan, G. M. Young, Veronica Wedgwood, Eric Linklater, Alan Bullock, A. J. P. Taylor, D. W. Brogan, G. D. H. Cole and Max Beloff. Later, Hodge and Quennell brought in experts from a wide range of fields, including Kenneth Clark, Freya Stark, Nancy Mitford, Arthur Waley, Julian Huxley and Michael Grant. Hodge's editorial style was described as "scholarly, imaginative and judicious".

While editing the magazine Hodge took up a prolonged side-activity, the editing of Winston Churchill's History of the English-Speaking Peoples. Churchill had begun to work on this massive work during his "wilderness years", in 1932, and it was in proof by the time he re-entered the Cabinet in September 1939, at which point he had to lay it aside. In 1953, once again Prime Minister, he returned to the History, uncertain whether it was in a publishable state. His close friend Bracken advised him to take on Hodge as an editorial assistant, the introductions were made, and Hodge soon found himself leading a team of historians advising Churchill on necessary revisions. His brief was to produce "a lively, continuous narrative" emphasizing "famous dramatic events", but getting major changes made in the text proved very difficult. "Errors of fact were changed with courteous alacrity," according to the historian John H. Plumb; "subject to strong pressure, an adjective might or might not be pruned, but the grand design proved immutable." Hodge worked in various places: at home, at the History Today offices, at Chartwell (Churchill's home in Kent), and in the south of France where Churchill spent lengthy holidays. They developed a close friendship, but the work came to an end at last in 1957.

One project suffered from Hodge's heavy workload in these years. When his old friend Norman Cameron died from a stroke in 1953 leaving Hodge his copyrights, Hodge agreed to prepare an edition of his poems with an introduction by Robert Graves. This edition hung fire for a long time, to Graves's increasing anger, but the Collected Poems finally appeared in June 1957.

The same year, having resigned as Prime Minister amid heavy press criticism of the Suez Crisis, Anthony Eden decided to write his memoirs as a way of giving his side of the story. He recruited a team of historians to assist him, and Bracken once more stepped forward to recommend Hodge for his "grace of style and nicety of perspective". Hodge joined the team, and was kept occupied through to 1959.

In 1958, Brendan Bracken died, and Hodge was commissioned to write his biography. Hodge researched his subject diligently, but found himself hampered by the fact that Bracken had ordered his private papers to be burned after his death and also by a sense of loyalty to his old boss which would not have allowed him to publish everything he found. After several years he abandoned the task and gave his notes to Charles Lysaght and Andrew Boyle, both of whom were engaged on the same task.

In 1960, Hodge and Quennell collaborated on The Past We Share: An Illustrated History of the British and American Peoples. Reviews were mixed. Kirkus Reviews called it "a superb panoramic view of history with a somewhat misleading subtitle, for the emphasis is so largely British that the America aspects take definitely second place", The New Yorker "a more than ordinarily serious entry in a frequently trumped-up field", and The Booklist and Subscription Books Bulletin "an inviting historical summary for casual reading"; the Times Literary Supplement found the illustrations good in themselves but inaccurately captioned, the New York Herald Tribune thought that "the real past we share with the English was a broader, harsher, more dynamic and far more astonishing saga of conquest than this genteel survey suggests", The New York Times that "the luminous histories of our two peoples have not been dovetailed at all (as the title implied they would be) but rather set side by side to languish augustly in isolation from one another", but the Chicago Sunday Tribune believed that "this gallery of a pictured past is as rewarding as any the reader is likely to tour for some time".

Alan Hodge remained until his death the co-editor with Peter Quennell of History Today. He died at the age of 63 on 25 May 1979.

== Personal life ==
In 1942, Hodge opened the way for his first wife, Beryl, to marry Graves by instituting divorce proceedings, and the divorce was made absolute the following year. In the autumn of 1947, he met Jane Aiken, daughter of the poet and novelist Conrad Aiken, and on 3 January 1948 they married. He encouraged her to begin her successful career writing Gothic romances. They lived in Wimbledon and later Lewes, and had two daughters, Jessica and Joanna.

== Books co-authored by Alan Hodge ==
- Robert Graves and Alan Hodge The Long Week-End: A Social History of Great Britain 1918–1939 (London: Faber and Faber, 1940; New York: Macmillan, 1941)
- Alan Hodge, Norman Cameron and Robert Graves Work in Hand (London: The Hogarth Press, 1942)
- Robert Graves and Alan Hodge The Reader over Your Shoulder: A Handbook for Writers of English Prose (London: Jonathan Cape, 1943; New York: Macmillan, 1944)
- Peter Quennell and Alan Hodge The Past We Share: An Illustrated History of the British and American Peoples (London: Weidenfeld and Nicolson, 1960; New York: Putnam, 1960)
