= The Reader Over Your Shoulder =

1943 style guide by Robert Graves and Alan Hodge

The Reader Over Your Shoulder: A Handbook for Writers of English Prose (1943) is a style guide by the poet and novelist Robert Graves and the historian and journalist Alan Hodge. It takes the form of a study of the principles and history of writing in English, followed by a series of passages by well-known writers subjected to a critical analysis by Graves and Hodge. It was favourably reviewed on first publication, and has since received enthusiastic praise.

== Composition ==
The book's authors, Robert Graves and Alan Hodge, had been friends since they had met in Mallorca in 1935, when Hodge was still an undergraduate. They collaborated on a social history of Britain between the two world wars, The Long Week-End. By August 1940 the two were working together on what Graves called a "new book about English prose...for the general reader, and also for intelligent colleges and VI-forms". Originally intended to help Graves's daughter Jenny Nicholson, it was eventually published as The Reader Over Your Shoulder: A Handbook for Writers of English Prose.

Its plan, which owes something to Laura Riding's 1938 work The World and Ourselves, is as follows: first come chapters entitled "The Peculiar Qualities of English", "The Present Confusion of English Prose", "Where Is Good English to Be Found?", and "The Use and Abuse of Official English"; then a history of English prose, quoting many examples; then chapters on "The Principles of Clear Statement" and "The Graces of Prose"; finally, taking up the greater part of the book, the authors present under the title "Examinations and Fair Copies" fifty-four stylistically aberrant passages by well-known writers, analyze their faults, and rewrite them in better English. This last section, according to the Irish literary critic Denis Donoghue, "accounted for much of the fame and nearly all of the delight that the book has given its readers". Getting copyright waivers from each of the 54 writers made demands on the co-authors' time, and since this section was, in Graves's words, "dynamite under so many chairs", also on their diplomacy.

Their private nickname for the book was A Short Cut to Unpopularity. The publishers Faber and Faber initially accepted the book while it was still in progress, but later took fright and dropped it; it was finally published in May 1943 by Jonathan Cape. There have been several later editions, some at full length and some drastically abridged.

== Reception ==
G. W. Stonier, reviewing The Reader Over Your Shoulder in the New Statesman and Nation, regretted that "a book, whose general aims are admirable, should be spoilt so often by its pedantry", but most other contemporary reviews were favourable: "it might seem that The Reader Over Your Shoulder would be unavoidably dry on questions of punctuation and grammar, but even here it is witty and stimulating — a desk-book for the writer that should never fail to key him up", "a stimulating and stirring book, which meets a great and genuine need of our times", "instructive and entertaining book", "highly pleasurable and in some degree profitable", "any editor of [this journal] would mortgage the office filing cabinet to place this book before the eyes of every contributor".

The Spectator wryly noted that "this book, with its high standards, its scholarship and its brilliance, is exactly calculated to suit the contemporary taste for spiced and potted knowledge which it deplores". Evelyn Waugh wrote in The Tablet, "This is the century of the common man; let him write as he speaks and let him speak as he pleases. This the deleterious opinion to which The Reader Over Your Shoulder provides a welcome corrective"; he ended, "as a result of having read [it]...I have taken about three times as long to write this review as is normal, and still dread committing it to print". It has been highly praised in the years since.

For the sociologist C. Wright Mills it was "the best book I know" on writing, for the academic Greg Myers, "relentlessly prescriptive and hilarious", for the journalist Mark Halperin "one of the three or four books on usage that deserve a place on the same shelf as Fowler". The biographer Miranda Seymour said that "as a handbook to style, it has never been bettered", and the literary critic Denis Donoghue wrote, "I don't know any other book in which expository prose is read so seriously, carefully, helpfully. For this reason the book is just as important as I. A. Richards' Practical Criticism". He went on, "there is no point in being scandalized by the assumption in The Reader Over Your Shoulder that good English is the sort of English written by Graves and Hodge. In my opinion, that claim is justified."

== Sources ==
- Donoghue, Denis (1989) [1988]. England, Their England: Commentaries on English Language and Literature. Los Angeles: University of California Press. ISBN 0520066928.
- Graves, Richard Perceval (1998) [1995]. Robert Graves and the White Goddess, 1940–1985. London: Phoenix Giant. ISBN 0753801167.
- Graves, Robert (1982). O'Prey, Paul (ed.). In Broken Images: Selected Letters of Robert Graves 1914–1946. London: Hutchinson. ISBN 0091477204.
- James, Mertice M.; Brown, Dorothy, eds. (1944). The Book Review Digest. Volume 39. New York: H. W. Wilson.
- Seymour, Miranda (1995). Robert Graves: Life on the Edge. London: Doubleday. ISBN 0385408609.
