= Chislehurst =

Settlement in Southeast England

Coordinates: 51.412°N 0.075°E

- Village
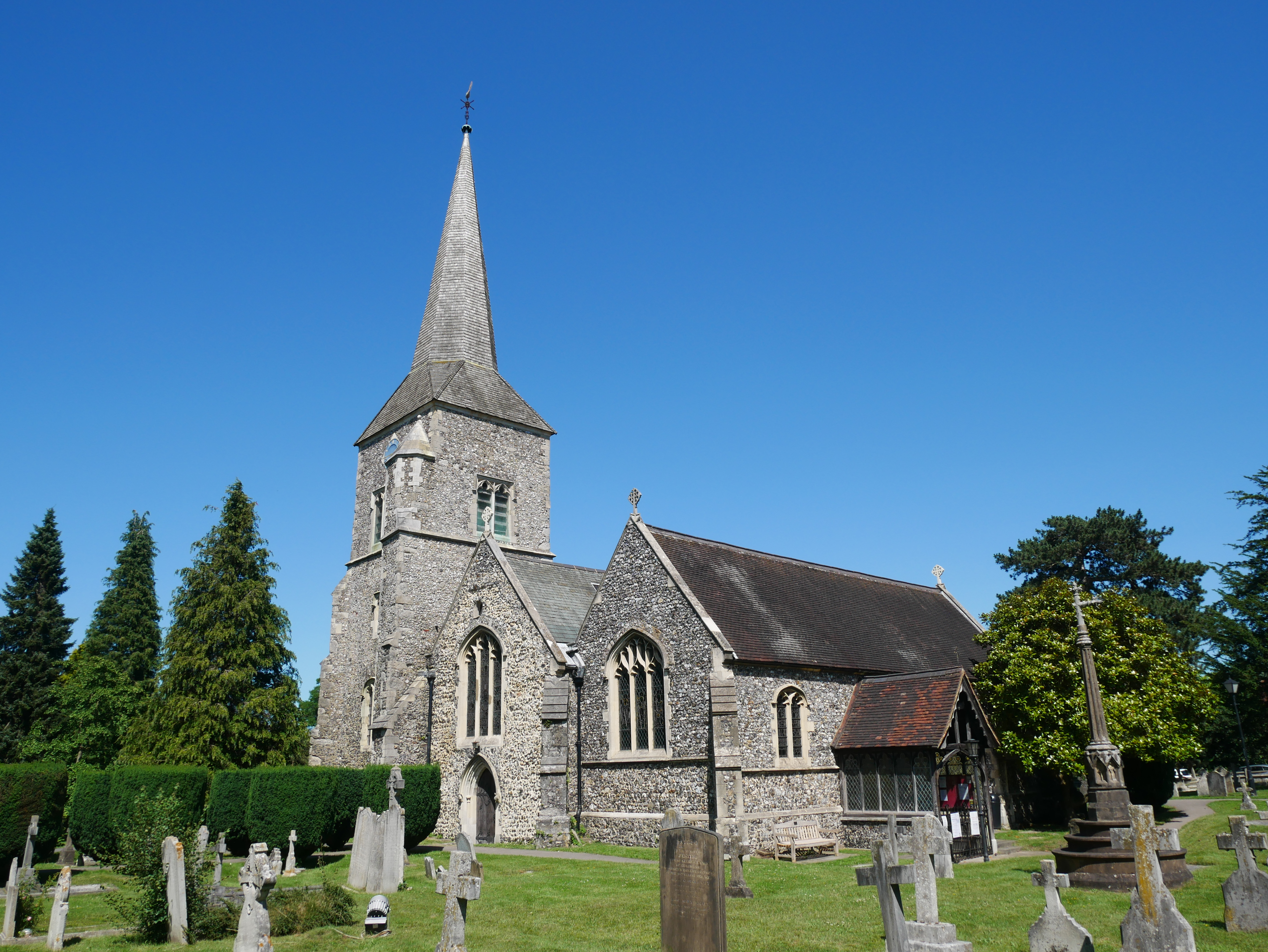
- The Saxon Church of Saint Nicholas, the oldest standing building in Chislehurst.

- Location within Greater London
- Population: 15,600 (2021 census)
- OS grid reference: TQ445705
  - Charing Cross: 10 mi (16 km) NW
- London borough: Bromley
- Ceremonial county: Greater London
- Region: London
- Country: England
- Sovereign state: United Kingdom
- Post town: Chislehurst
- Postcode district: BR7
- Dialling code: 020
- Police: Metropolitan
- Fire: London
- Ambulance: London
- UK Parliament: Eltham and Chislehurst
- London Assembly: Bexley and Bromley

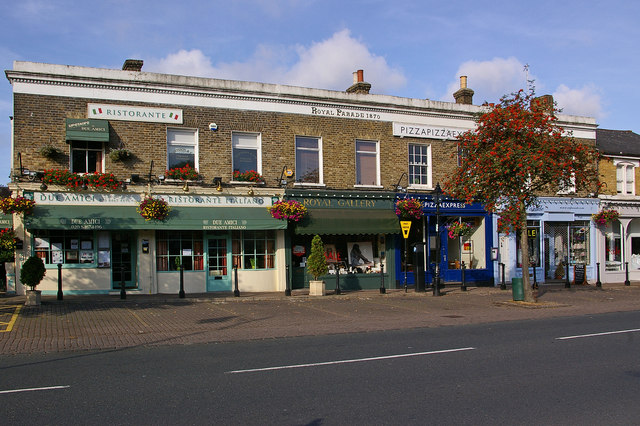
Royal Parade

Chislehurst (/ˈtʃɪzəlˌhɜːrst/) is an affluent suburban district of south-east London, England, in the London Borough of Bromley. It lies east of Bromley, south-west of Sidcup and north-west of Orpington, 10 miles (16 km) south-east of Charing Cross. Before the creation of Greater London in 1965, it was in Kent. According to the 2021 census, Chislehurst has a population of 15,600 (rounded to the nearest 100).

== History ==
The name "Chislehurst" is derived from the Saxon words cisel, "gravel", and hyrst, "wooded hill".

The Walsingham family, including Christopher Marlowe's patron, Sir Thomas Walsingham and Queen Elizabeth I's spymaster, Francis Walsingham, had a home in Scadbury Park, now a nature reserve in which the ruins of the house can still be seen.

A water tower used to straddle the road from Chislehurst to Bromley until it was demolished in 1963 as one of the last acts of the Chislehurst and Sidcup UDC. It marked the entrance to the Wythes Estate in Bickley, but its narrow archway meant that double-decker buses were not able to be used on the route.

== Governance ==
In 1894 the civil parish of Chislehurst became part of Bromley Rural District, in 1900 Chislehurst became an urban district of Kent, the district only contained the parish of Chislehurst. On 1934 the district and parish were abolished to form Chislehurst and Sidcup Urban District and parish, part also went to Orpington and Bromley. Chislehurst and Sidcup was split in 1965 between the London boroughs of Bromley and Bexley. At the 1931 census (the last before the abolition of the parish), Chislehurst had a population of 9876. Chislehurst ward has three councillors on Bromley Council: the first non-Conservative party candidates returned for the ward were Chislehurst Matters members elected in 2022.

== Demographics ==
As of 2021, Chislehurst is recorded as having a population of roughly 15,600. 35.3% of people in Chislehurst were recorded as being between the ages of 35 and 59, below the borough average of 36.4%. The largest religious group is Christian at 51.5%, above the borough average of 48.3%, with the second largest group being No religion at 33.8%, below the borough average of 37.3%. The largest ethnic group in Chislehurst is White, comprising 81.4% of the population, above the borough average of 76.5%, with the second largest being Asian/Asian British who make up 7.9% of the population, below the borough average of 8.3%.

== Geography ==
Chislehurst is largely a residential area. Chislehurst West, previously known as "Pricking" or "Prickend", includes the biggest of the ponds and the High Street.

Chislehurst is one of the starting points for the Green Chain Walk, linking to places such as Crystal Palace, Erith, the Thames Barrier and Thamesmead.

Chislehurst Common (and nearby St Paul's Cray Common) were saved from development in 1888 following campaigns by local residents. They were a popular destination for bank holiday trips in the early 20th century, and now provide a valuable green space. Nearby Petts Wood, Hawkwood and Scadbury have also been preserved as open spaces following local campaigns.

=== Chislehurst Conservation Area ===
A 2017 list shows there have been 596.4 hectares (1,474 acres) in Chislehurst designated as conservation areas since 1971. The designation of conservation areas is one of the many planning tactics used in the United Kingdom that includes local planning authorities (LPA's), with plans working in conjunction such as the listing of buildings and scheduled monuments, metropolitan Green Belts, National Trusts, and "Tree Preservation Orders". These give stringent policies against development with statues and non-statutory orders. The destruction of many trees and Victorian style buildings caused by bombing during WWII, as well as the ensuing building boom, made protection even more critical. The result is the protection of areas by preventing arbitrary destruction from large as well as small-scale development that can cause a creeping effect into side spaces and back gardens.

=== Nearby areas ===
Chislehurst borders New Eltham to the north, Sidcup to the north east and east, St Paul's Cray to the south east, Petts Wood to the south, Bickley to the south west, Elmstead to the west and Mottingham to the north west.

== Landmarks ==
=== Chislehurst Caves ===
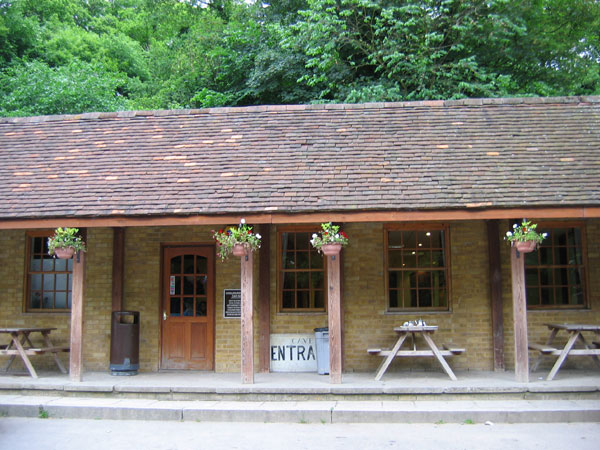
Chislehurst Caves entrance

A local attraction is Chislehurst Caves. They were originally used to mine flint and chalk. During World War II, they were used nightly as an air-raid shelter. There is a chapel inside. A child was born in the caves during World War II and was given a middle name of 'Cavena'. The caves have also been used as a venue for live music; Jimi Hendrix, the Who, the Rolling Stones, David Bowie, Pink Floyd and Led Zeppelin have all played there.

=== Camden Place ===
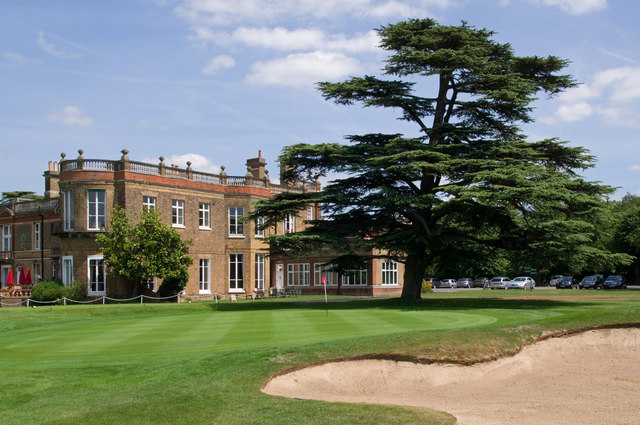
Camden Place in 2011

Camden Place (now Chislehurst Golf Club) takes its name from the antiquary William Camden, who lived in the former house on the site from c. 1609 until his death in 1623. The present house was built shortly before 1717. An occupant of the house, from 1871 until his death there in 1873, was the exiled French Emperor, Napoleon III. His body and that of his son, the Prince Imperial, were originally buried in St Mary's Catholic Church, before being removed to St Michael's Abbey, Farnborough.

=== War Memorial ===
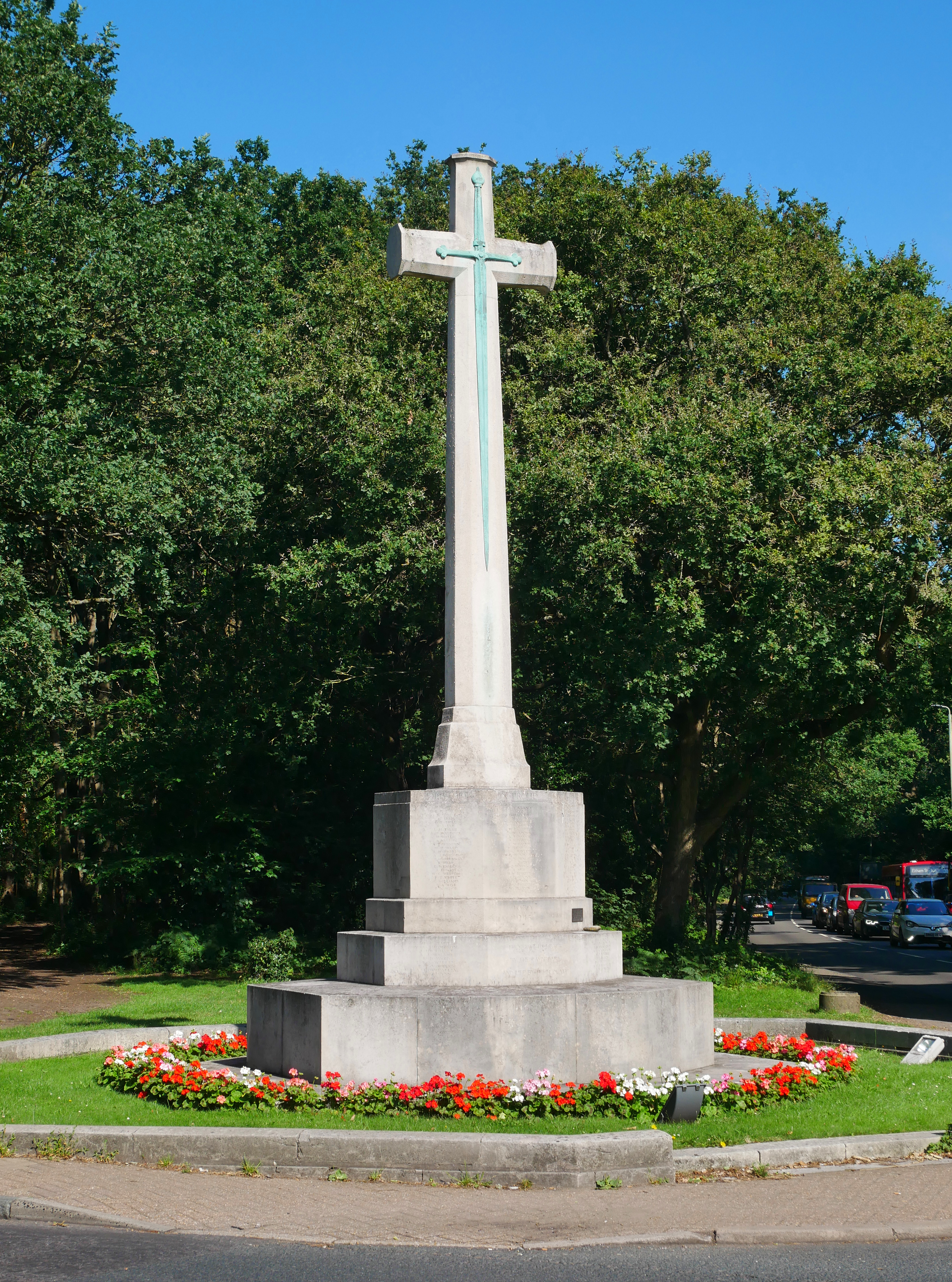
Chislehurst War Memorial

The Chislehurst War Memorial was dedicated on 17 October 1920. It commemorates the fallen of World War I and World War II.

== Transport ==
=== Rail ===
Chislehurst station, operated by Southeastern Railway, provides National Rail services to London Charing Cross, London Bridge and London Cannon Street via Lewisham.

=== Bus ===
Chislehurst is served by London Buses routes 61, 160, 161, 162, 269, 273, R7, SL3 and N136 (with 625, 638 and 661 passing through the historical town). These connect it with areas including Beckenham, Bexleyheath, Bromley, Catford, Eltham, Plumstead, Grove Park, Lewisham, North Greenwich, Orpington, Sidcup, Coney Hall and Woolwich.

== Education ==
- Bullers Wood School
- Bullers Wood School for Boys (part of Chislehurst and Bickley)
- Chislehurst School for Girls
- Coopers School
- Saint Nicholas Church of England Primary School
- Babington House School
- Farringtons School
- Chislehurst C of E Primary School
- Edgebury Primary School
- Red Hill Primary School
- Mead Road Infant School
- Marjorie McClure Special School

== Religious sites ==
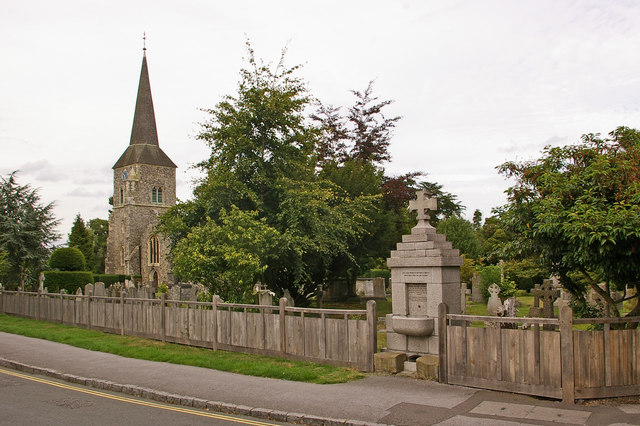
St Nicholas' Church and the Charles A Janson Memorial Drinking Fountain

- Chislehurst Baptist Church
- St Patrick's Catholic Church
- Christ Church Chislehurst
- Elmstead Baptist Church
- Chislehurst Methodist Church
- The Annuncation
- St. Nicholas
- Darul Uloom Mosque and School
- Ichthus Christian Fellowship
- St Mary's Catholic Church, original burial place of Napoleon III and his son, the Prince Imperial

== Notable people ==
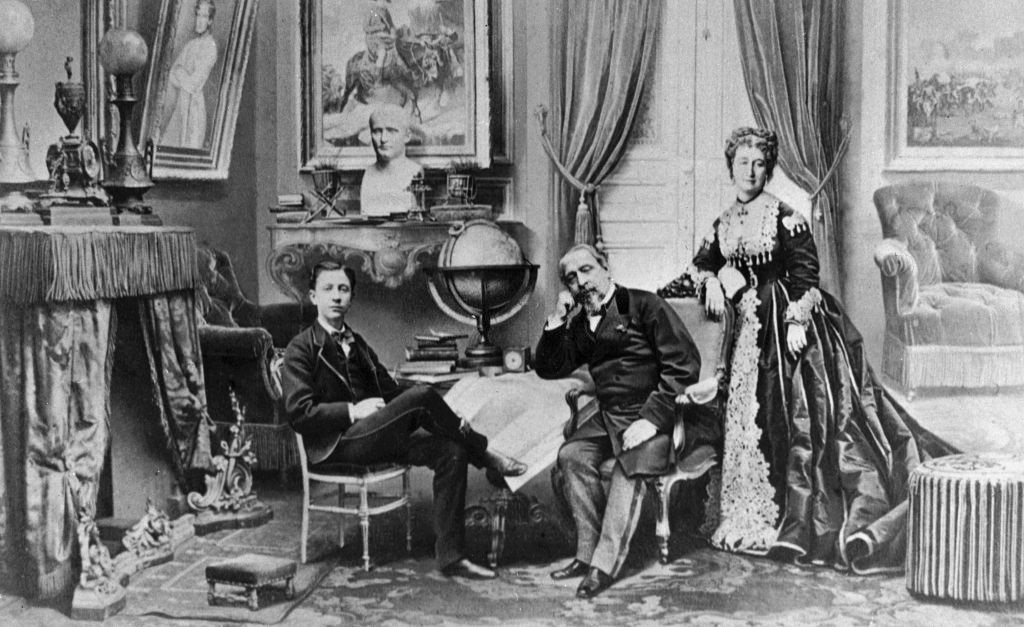
Louis-Napoleon Bonaparte with his wife Eugénie de Montijo and their son in exile in Chislehurst, 1872.

- Louis-Napoleon Bonaparte, President of France and Emperor of the French, lived in exile (1871–1873) in Camden Place, with his wife Eugénie de Montijo (remained in the area until 1885) and son Louis-Napoléon, Prince Imperial (died 1879).
- William Camden (1551–1623), Clarenceux King of Arms, lived in the house later known as Camden Place from c. 1609 until 1623
- Malcolm Campbell, former land and water speed record holder, was born in Chislehurst and is buried in St. Nicholas Parish Church
- George Somers Leigh Clarke (1822–1882), architect who lived at Walpole, Manor Park and is buried in the St Nicholas' churchyard.
- Richmal Crompton, author of the Just William series of books.
- Craig Fairbrass, actor
- Arthur Hay, 9th Marquess of Tweeddale (1824–1878), soldier and ornithologis, died in Chislehurst
- Tilly Keeper, who plays Louise Mitchell in BBC One soap opera EastEnders.
- E. J. May (1853–1941), architect, lived locally and designed a number of local buildings.
- Eugénie de Montijo, Countess of Teba and Empress of France.
- Jozef Michal Poniatowski, Polish nobleman, composer.
- Charles Pratt (1714–1794), Earl Camden, a British politician and judge, who lived at Camden Place
- Peter Redpath, Canadian businessman
- Brian Sibley, writer and biographer, best known for books on J.R.R. Tolkien and C.S. Lewis
- Siouxsie Sioux, singer, best known for being in the band Siouxsie and the Banshees
- Thomas Townshend, 1st Viscount Sydney; the city of Sydney, Australia is named after him.
- Francis Walsingham, spymaster to Elizabeth I.
- Alan Watts, philosopher, born and raised in Chislehurst, moved to the United States in 1938.
- William Willett, a campaigner for daylight saving time, lived most of his adult life in Chislehurst.
- Ted Willis, creator of Dixon of Dock Green.
- William Hyde Wollaston, chemist and physicist who discovered rhodium and palladium.
