= Louis Frederic Austin =

British journalist and writer

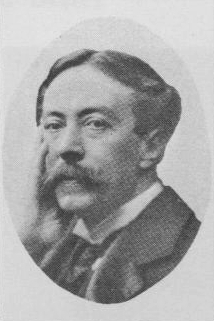
Louis Frederic Austin

Louis Frederic Austin (L.F. Austin, 1852/4–1905) was a British literary journalist, theatre critic, and long-time secretary to Henry Irving. He was a regular contributor to The Illustrated London News and The Sketch. He also wrote under the pen names Augustin Lewis (in Dublin University Magazine), and Frederic Daly.

== Bibliography ==
- 1886, Henry Irving in England and America 1838–84
- 1896, At Random : Essays and Stories
- 1896, The Astrologer at Large : An Interview with Old Moore, English Illustrated Magazine
- 1906, Points of View, edited by Clarence Rook
