= Marjorie Quennell =

British historian, illustrator and museum curator

- Born: Marjorie Courtney; 1884; Bromley, United Kingdom
- Died: 1972 (aged 87–88); London, United Kingdom
- Spouse: C. H. B. Quennell (m. 1904–1935)

Marjorie (Courtney) Quennell (1884–1972) was a British historian, illustrator and museum curator.

== Life ==
Her husband was architect Charles Henry Bourne Quennell (1872–1935). They met at the Junior Art Workers Guild. They had three children, including a son Peter Courtney Quennell (1905–1993) who became a well-known writer and was editor of History Today.

After World War I the Quennells wrote a series of illustrated children’s books, A History of Everyday Things in England, 4 volumes (1918–1934). The series ended with The Good New Days (1935), where modern industrial and agricultural processes, together with the problems of the future, were considered. A second series was written, Everyday Life in… (1921–26) describing living from Prehistoric to Norman times. A third series of Everyday Things (1929–32) covered Greece in antiquity. After World War II she illustrated two more books in the Everyday Life series on Biblical times, the texts being written by others. She was a painter in oils and watercolour, mostly of architectural subjects.

After her husband died in 1935 she was appointed curator of the Geffrye Museum. While there she installed the series of "period rooms" on which the museum is still based to this day. She remained there until she retired in 1940, then moved to the United States

== Works ==
Author

- Marjorie & C. H. B. Quennell, A History of Everyday Things in England, London, B. T. Batsford Ltd, 1918-1934
  - Volume I: 1066-1449
  - Volume II: 1500-1799
  - Volume III: 1733-1851
  - Volume IV: 1852-1914
- Marjorie & C. H. B. Quennell, A History of Everyday Life in.., London, B. T. Batsford Ltd, 1921-1926.
  - Everyday life in Anglo-Saxon, Viking, and Norman times
  - Everyday Life in Roman Britain
  - Everyday Life in Prehistoric Times (vol. 1 The Old Stone Age, vol. 2 The New Stone Age)
- Marjorie & C. H. B. Quennell, Everyday Things in Greece, London, B. T. Batsford Ltd, 1929-1932.
  - Volume 1: Homeric Greece
  - Volume 2: Archaic Greece
  - Volume 3: Classical Greece
- Marjorie & C. H. B. Quennell, The Good New Days, London, B. T. Batsford Ltd., 1935.
- Marjorie Quennell, London Craftsman: A Guide to Museums Having Relics of Old Trades, London, London Transport, 1939.

Illustrator

- E. Lucia Turnbull and H. Dalway Turnbull, Through the Gates of Remembrance: First Series: A Trilogy of Plays Centred Round Glastonbury, London, T. Nelson & Sons, 1933.
- Elisabeth Kyle, Disappearing Island, Boston, Houghton Mifflin Co., 1944.
- Gertrude Hartman and Lucy S. Saunders, Builders of the Old World, Boston, D. C. Heath & Co., 1949. [Vol. 4 of the History on the March series]
- A. C. Bouquet, Everyday Life in New Testament Times, London, B. T. Batsford Ltd, 1953.
- Wallace Walter Atwood and Helen Goss Thomas, Visits in Other Lands, Toronto, Ginn, [1943].
- E. W. Heaton, Everyday Life in Old Testament Times, London, Batsford Ltd, 1957.
