= Peter Quennell =

English writer (1905–1993)

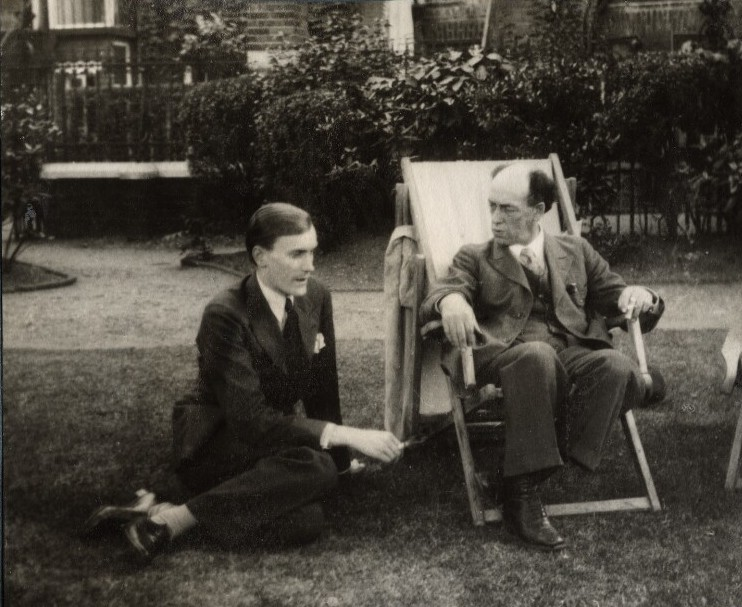
Quennell (left) with James Stephens in 1929

Sir Peter Courtney Quennell (9 March 1905 – 27 October 1993) was an English biographer, literary historian, editor, essayist, journalist, poet and critic. He wrote extensively on social history. In his Times obituary he was described as "the last genuine example of the English man of letters". Anthony Powell called him "The Last of the Mandarins".

== Life and work ==
Born in Bickley, Kent, he was the son of architect C. H. B. Quennell and his wife Marjorie Quennell. After World War I the Quennells wrote a popular series of illustrated children’s books, A History of Everyday Things in England (four volumes, 1918–1934). Peter Quennell was educated at Berkhamsted School (where the headmaster was Graham Greene's father) and at Balliol College, Oxford, though he left Oxford before taking a degree.

While still at school some of his poems were selected by Richard Hughes for the anthology Public School Verse, which brought him to the attention of writers such as Edith Sitwell. At Oxford he forged some lasting literary friendships, including with Robert Graves, and made some enemies (Evelyn Waugh).

In all he published over thirty books and edited thirty-seven more.

=== Biography ===
In 1922 he published his first book, Masques and Poems, and gained further attention when some of his poems were published in the influential Edward Marsh anthology Georgian Poetry 1920–1922. But Quennell soon abandoned poetry for prose, and especially biography and non-fiction. His first major book, commissioned by T. S. Eliot, was Baudelaire and the Symbolists (1929). Other literary biographies followed, including the Four Portraits of 1945 (studies of Boswell, Gibbon, Sterne, and Wilkes), and full length works on Byron (three volumes, 1934, 1935, 1941), Pope (1949), Ruskin (1949), Hogarth (1955), Shakespeare (1963), Proust (1971) and Samuel Johnson (1972).

=== Journalism ===
He first practised journalism in London and wrote several books and essays on London (for instance, Casanova in London, 1971). In 1930 he taught at the University of Tokyo, a somewhat negative experience he turned into a positive through the success of his written account, A Superficial Journey through Tokyo and Peking (1932). During the war he took posts within the Ministry of Information and the Auxiliary Fire Service. In 1944–51, he was editor of The Cornhill Magazine and from 1951 to 1979 founder-editor of History Today, working in partnership with the historian Alan Hodge.

=== Autobiography ===
Quennell published three volumes of autobiography, The Sign of the Fish (1960, his own growth as a writer), The Marble Foot (1976, covering the years 1905 to 1938) and The Wanton Chase: an Autobiography from 1939 (1980). Customs and Characters (1982) collected together anecdotes of his friends and contemporaries. He continued to work hard even into his old age, tackling more general subjects in his later work. His final book, In Pursuit of Happiness (1988), published when he was 83 years old, was a response to a remark from his father, remembered from childhood: "Well, we're not happy are we?"

=== Personal life ===
He married five times: to Nancy Marianne (1928), Marcelle Marie José (1935), Joyce Frances Glur (1938), Sonia Geraldine Leon (1956, daughter Sarah), and Joan Marilyn Peek (1967, son Alexander). He also had a relationship with the writer Barbara Skelton in the 1940s, sharing a flat with her.

He was appointed a Commander of the Order of the British Empire (CBE), and was knighted in the 1992 New Year Honours. Quennell died in University College Hospital, Camden, London. His funeral was held at St Mark's Church, Regent's Park.

Quennell's first cousin – daughter of his father's brother Walter – was Joan Quennell, a Conservative MP.

== Publications ==
=== Author ===
- Masques & Poems (1922)
- Poems (1926)
- Inscription on a Fountainhead (1929), poetry pamphlet
- Baudelaire And The Symbolists: Five Essays (1929)
- The Phoenix Kind (1931), novel
- A Superficial Journey Through Tokyo and Peking (1932), travel memoir
- A Letter to Mrs. Virginia Woolf (Hogarth Press 1932)
- Byron (1934), Duckworth "Great Lives" series
- Byron: The Years of Fame (1935)
- Somerset (1936), Shell Guide (with his father, C. H. B. Quennell)
- Victorian Panorama: A Survey of Life & Fashion from Contemporary Photographs (1937)
- Sympathy (1938), short stories (Quennell's last attempt at fiction)
- Caroline of England: An Augustan Portrait (1940)
- Byron In Italy (1941)
- Four Portraits: Studies of the Eighteenth Century – James Boswell, Edward Gibbon, Laurence Sterne, John Wilkes (1945)
- John Ruskin: The Portrait of a Prophet (1949)
- The Singular Preference: Portraits & Essays (1952)
- Spring In Sicily (1952), travel book
- Diversions of History (1954)
- Hogarth's Progress (1955)
- The Past We Share. An Illustrated History of the British and American Peoples (1960), with Alan Hodge
- The Sign of the Fish (1960, autobiographical essays)
- Alexander Pope: The Education of Genius 1688–1728 (1968)
- The Colosseum: A History of Rome from the Time of Nero (1971)
- Shakespeare: A Biography (1963)
- Who's Who in Shakespeare (1971)
- Casanova in London (1971), essays
- Marcel Proust, 1871–1922: A Centennial Volume (1971)
- Samuel Johnson: His Friends and Enemies (1973)
- A History of English Literature (1973)
- The Marble Foot: An Autobiography, 1905–1938 (1977), vol. 1 of autobiography
- The Day Before Yesterday: A Photographic Album of Daily Life in Victorian and Edwardian Britain (1978)
- Customs and Characters: Contemporary Portraits (1982)
- Wanton Chase: An Autobiography from 1939 (1980), vol. 2 of autobiography
- The Last Edwardians: An Illustrated History of Violet Trefusis and Alice Keppel (1985) with John Phillips and Lorna Sage
- The Pursuit of Happiness (1988)

=== As editor or anthologist ===
- Harold Acton and Peter Quennell (eds.) Oxford Poetry (1924)
- Antoine Hamilton, transl. Quennell: Memoirs of the Comte de Gramont (1930)
- Aspects of Seventeenth Century Verse (1933, selected and prepared by Quennell)
- The Private Letters of Princess Lieven to Prince Metternich 1820–1826 (1937) editor
- George Paston: To Lord Byron: Feminine Profiles – based upon unpublished letters 1807–1824 (1939) completed and edited by Quennell
- Samivel, trans. Quennell and Katharine Busvine. Brown the Bear: Who Scared the Villagers Out of Their Wits (circa 1940)
- Cecil Beaton: Time Exposure (1946, photographs with commentary and captions by Quennell)
- The Pleasures Of Pope (1949, anthology)
- Henry Mayhew, ed. Quennell: Mayhew's London (1949)
- Byron (ed. Quennell): A Self-Portrait: Letters and Diaries 1798–1824 (2 volumes) (1950)
- Henry Mayhew, ed. Quennell: London's Underworld (1951)
- Henry Mayhew, ed. Quennell: Mayhew's Characters (1951)
- Selected Writings of John Ruskin (1952) editor
- Byron, ed. Quennell: Selected Verse and Prose Works Including Letters and Extracts from Byron's Journal and Diaries (1959)
- Byronic Thoughts: Maxims Reflections Portraits From the Prose and Verse of Lord Byron (1961)
- Selected Essays of Henry de Montherlant (1961) editor, with John Weightman, translator
- William Hickey, ed. Quennell: The Prodigal Rake: Memoirs of William Hickey (1962) editor
- Edward Lear in Southern Italy: Journals of a Landscape Painter in Southern Calabria and the Kingdom of Naples (1964) introduction
- The Journal of Thomas Moore (1964) editor
- Romantic England Writing And Painting 1717–1851 (1970)
- Vladimir Nabokov: A Tribute (1979) editor
- Genius in the Drawing Room: The Literary Salon in the Nineteenth and Twentieth Centuries (UK edition); Affairs of the Mind: The Salon in Europe and America (US edition) (1980) editor
- A Lonely Business: A Self-Portrait of James Pope-Hennessy (1981) editor
- The Selected Essays of Cyril Connolly (1984) editor
- An Illustrated Companion to World Literature (1986) editor, original Tore Zetterholm

== See also ==
- Duncan Fallowell, 20th Century Characters, ch. Feline: the Quennells on Primrose Hill, (London, Vintage books, 1994)
