= Jane Aiken Hodge =

American novelist

- Born: December 4, 1917 near Cambridge, Massachusetts, U.S.
- Died: June 17, 2009 (aged 91); Lewes, Sussex, England
- Education: Somerville College, Oxford; Radcliffe College
- Occupation: Writer
- Spouse: Alan Hodge (m. 1948)
- Children: 2
- Parent(s): Conrad Aiken; Jessie McDonald
- Relatives: Joan Aiken (sister)

Jane Aiken Hodge (December 4, 1917 – June 17, 2009) was an American-born British writer.

== Life ==
Born near Cambridge, Massachusetts, the second child of Pulitzer prize-winning poet Conrad Aiken and his first wife, the writer Jessie McDonald. Jane Hodge was 3 years old when her family moved to Great Britain, settling in Rye, East Sussex where her younger sister, Joan, who would become a novelist and a children's writer, was born. Their parents' marriage was dissolved in 1929.

From 1935, Jane Hodge read English at Somerville College, Oxford University, and in 1938 she took a second degree in English at Radcliffe College, USA, her mother's alma mater. She was a civil servant for a time, and also worked for Time magazine, before returning to the UK in 1947.

In 1948 she married Alan Hodge, an English historian and journalist. Hodge had divorced his first wife Beryl to allow her to marry the poet Robert Graves.

Her works of fiction include historical novels and contemporary detective novels. In 1972 she renounced her United States citizenship and became a British subject.

For many years a believer in the right of people to end their own lives, Hodge chose to end her own life by means of an overdose in June 2009. The Times obituary (pub. July 25, 2009) stated that she left "a letter expressing her deep distress that she had felt unable to discuss her plans with her daughters without risking making them accessories.". She died at home in Lewes, Sussex on June 17, 2009 and was survived by two daughters and two granddaughters.

== Select bibliography ==
=== Non-fiction ===
- (1972) Only a Novel: The Double Life of Jane Austen
- (1984) The Private World of Georgette Heyer, Arrow Books. ISBN 978-0-09-949349-5
- (1996) Passion and Principle: Loves And Lives of Regency Women

=== Fiction ===
- (1961) Marry in Haste
- (1963) Maulever Hall
- (1965) The Adventurers a.k.a.Royal Gamble (U.S.)
- (1966) Watch the Wall My Darling
- (1967) Here Comes a Candle a.k.a. The Master of Penrose (U.S.)
- (1968) The Winding Stair
- (1970) Greek Wedding
- (1970) Savannah Purchase a.k.a. All for Love (2018)
- (1973) Strangers in Company
- (1973) Shadow of a Lady
- (1974) One Way to Venice
- (1975) Rebel Heiress
- (1976) Runaway Bride
- (1976) Judas Flowering
- (1977) Red Sky At Night a.k.a. Red Sky at Night, Lovers' Delight (U.S.)
- (1979) Last Act
- (1981) Wide Is the Water
- (1982) The Lost Garden
- (1985) Secret Island
- (1987) Polonaise
- (1989) First Night
- (1990) Leading Lady
- (1992) Windover
- (1993) Escapade
- (1995) Whispering
- (1996) Bride of Dreams
- (1997) Unsafe Hands
- (1998) Susan in America
- (1999) Caterina
- (2000) A Death in Two Parts
- (2003) Deathline
