= Hooliganism =

Disruptive or unlawful behavior such as rioting, bullying, and vandalism

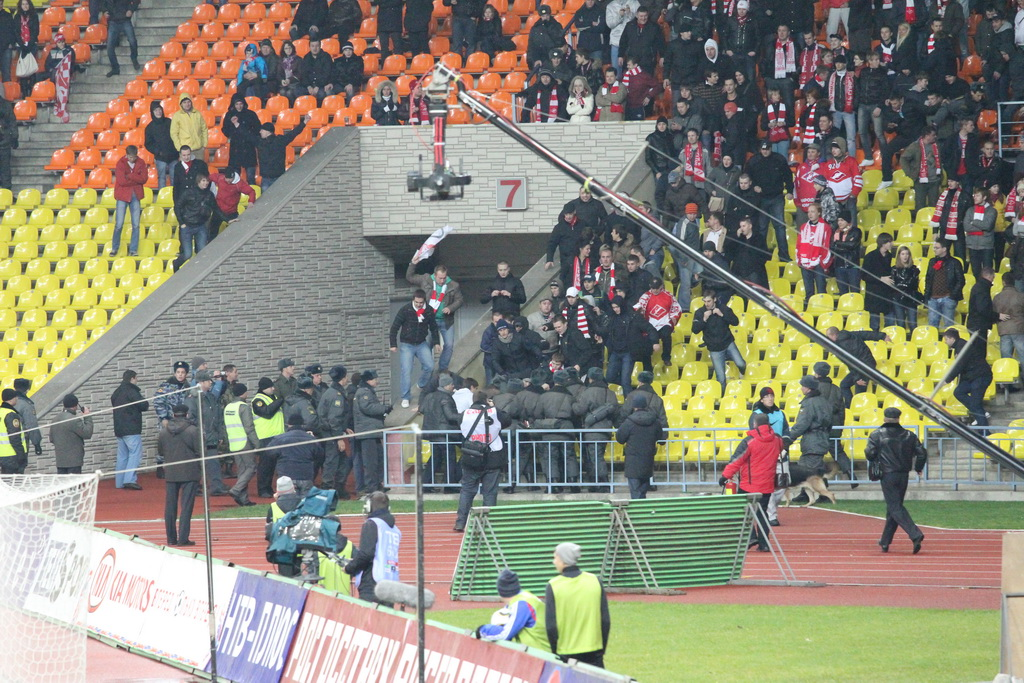
Hooligans at a football match of Spartak Moscow in November 2010

Hooliganism is the act of disruptive, obnoxious, violent or unlawful behavior such as rioting, bullying and vandalism, in connection with crowded events, such as speeches or sporting events. A hooligan is a person who engages in illicit reckless behaviors and is a public nuisance. The word hooligan first came into prominent usage in the 1890s in the United Kingdom.

== Etymology ==
There are several theories regarding the origin of the word hooliganism, which is a derivative of the word hooligan. The Compact Oxford English Dictionary states that the word may have originated from the surname of a rowdy Irish family in a music hall song of the 1890s. Clarence Rook, in his 1899 book Hooligan Nights, wrote that the word came from Patrick Hoolihan (or Hooligan), an Irish bouncer and thief who lived in London. In 2015, the BBC Scotland TV programme The Secret Life of Midges noted that the commander-in-chief of government forces during the Jacobite rising of 1745, General Wade, misheard the local Scots Gaelic word for midge—meanbh-chuileag—and coined the word hooligan to describe his fury and frustration at the way the tiny biting creatures made the lives of him and his soldiers a misery; this derivation may be apocryphal.

=== Early usage ===
The word first appeared in print in London police court reports in 1894 referring to the name of a gang of youths in the Lambeth area of London—the Hooligan Boys, and later—the O'Hooligan Boys.

In August 1898 the murder of Henry Mappin in Lambeth committed by a member of the gang drew further attention to the word which was immediately popularised by the press. The London newspaper The Daily Graphic wrote in an article on 22 August 1898, "The avalanche of brutality which, under the name of 'Hooliganism' ... has cast such a dire slur on the social records of South London."

The inquest was carried out by Mr Braxton Hicks who "remarked that the activity of the gang he referred to was not confined to Lambeth, but extended to numerous other districts. It was composed of young fellows who scorned to do a stroke of work, and obtained a living by blackmailing. It was a common practice for three or four of these men to walk into a shop and offer the shopman the alternative of giving them a dollar for drink or having his shop wrecked. In connection with the Oakley-street tragedy intimidation had reached an unexampled case. Witnesses had been warned that it would be as much as their life was worth to give evidence against John Darcy. On Wednesday plain-clothes men escorted the witnesses from the court singly. He himself had been warned — not by anonymous letter but through a mysterious personal medium — that if seen in a certain neighbourhood he would be done for. A magistrate had also told him that he had been the recipient of a like indignity."

Arthur Conan Doyle wrote in his 1904 short story "The Adventure of the Six Napoleons", "It seemed to be one of those senseless acts of Hooliganism which occur from time to time, and it was reported to the constable on the beat as such." H. G. Wells wrote in his 1909 semi-autobiographical novel Tono-Bungay, "Three energetic young men of the hooligan type, in neck-wraps and caps, were packing wooden cases with papered-up bottles, amidst much straw and confusion."

According to Life magazine (30 July 1951), the comic strip artist and political cartoonist Frederick Burr Opper introduced a character called Happy Hooligan in 1900; "hapless Happy appeared regularly in U.S. newspapers for more than 30 years", a "naive, skinny, baboon-faced tramp who invariably wore a tomato can for a hat." Life brought this up by way of criticizing the Soviet U.N. delegate Yakov A. Malik for misusing the word. Malik had indignantly referred to anti-Soviet demonstrators in New York as "hooligans". Happy Hooligan, Life reminded its readers, "became a national hero, not by making trouble, which Mr. Malik understands is the function of a hooligan, but by getting himself help."

=== Modern usage ===
Later, as the meaning of the word shifted slightly, none of the possible alternatives had precisely the same undertones of a person, usually young, who belongs to an informal group and commits acts of vandalism or criminal damage, starts fights, and who causes disturbances but is not a thief. Hooliganism is now predominantly related to sport.

== Violence in sports ==
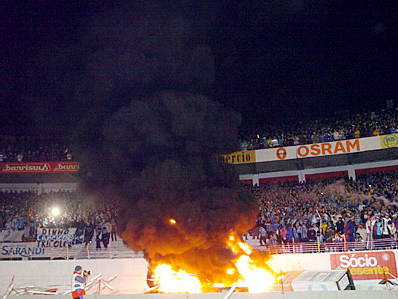
Grêmio fans setting Internacional's Estádio Beira-Rio on fire during a Grenal derby, 2006.

The words hooliganism and hooligan began to be associated with violence in sports, in particular from the 1970s in the UK with football hooliganism. The phenomenon, however, long preceded the modern term; for example, one of the earliest known instances of crowd violence at a sporting event took place in ancient Constantinople. Two chariot racing factions, the Blues and the Greens, were involved in the Nika riots which lasted around a week in 532 CE; nearly half the city was burned or destroyed, in addition to tens of thousands of deaths.

Sports crowd violence continues to be a worldwide concerning phenomenon exacting at times a large number of injuries, damage to property and casualties. Individual, contextual, social and environmental factors interact and influence one another through a dynamic process occurring at different levels. Macro-sociological accounts suggest that structural strains, experiences of deprivation or a low socio-economic background can at times be instrumental to the acceptance and reproduction of norms that tolerate great levels of violence and territoriality, which is a common feature of football hooliganism. Furthermore, social cleavages within societies facilitate the development of strong in-groups bonds and intense feelings of antagonism towards outsiders which in turn can facilitate group identification and affect the likelihood of fan violence.

=== In British sports ===
Beginning in at least the 1960s, the United Kingdom gained a reputation worldwide for football hooliganism; the phenomenon was often dubbed the British or English Disease. However, since the 1980s and well into the 1990s, the UK government has led a widescale crackdown on football-related violence. While football hooliganism has been a growing concern in some continental European countries in recent years, British football fans now tend to have a better reputation abroad. Although reports of British football hooliganism still surface, the instances now tend to occur at pre-arranged locations rather than at the matches themselves.

=== In the Soviet Union and Russia ===
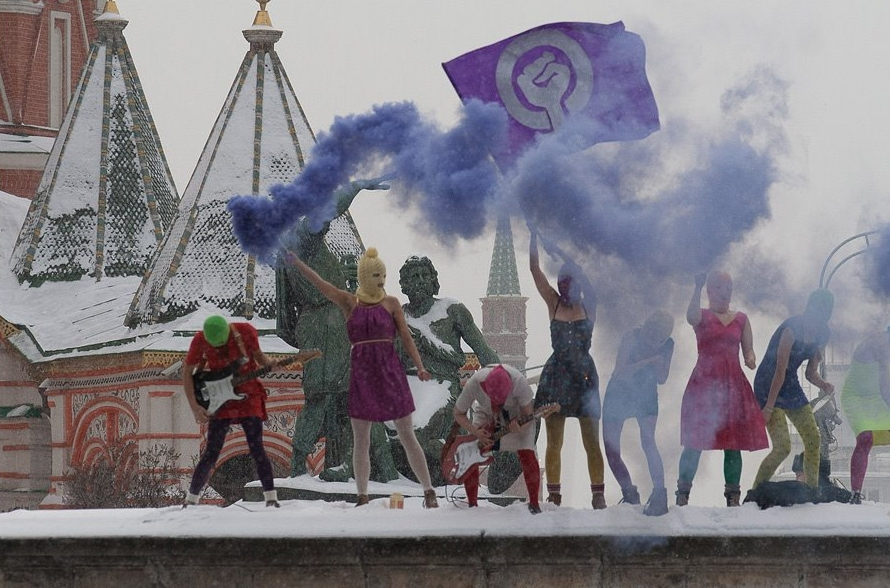
Pussy Riot performing at Lobnoye Mesto in Red Square, on 20 January 2012

In the Soviet Union the word khuligan (Russian: хулиган – transliteration of the English word) was used to refer to those perpetrating public misconduct. Hooliganism (Russian: хулиганство, khuliganstvo) was listed as a criminal offense, similar to disorderly conduct in some other jurisdictions, and used as a catch-all charge for prosecuting unapproved behavior.

Since the fall of the Soviet Union, hooliganism is defined generally in the Criminal Code of Russia as a medium gravity crime.

Olympic medalist Vasiliy Khmelevskiy was convicted of hooliganism for setting a costumed person on fire during a celebration in Minsk in 1979 and sentenced to five years of imprisonment. Mathias Rust was convicted of hooliganism, among other things, for his 1987 Cessna landing on Bolshoy Moskvoretsky Bridge next to Red Square.

More recently, the same charge has been leveled against members of the feminist punk group Pussy Riot for which three members each received a two-year sentence on 17 August 2012. Hooliganism charges were also levelled against the Greenpeace protesters in October 2013. In March 2022, Marina Ovsyannikova, a Russian journalist who held up a banner protesting the Russian invasion of Ukraine during a national news broadcast, was convicted of flouting Russian anti-protest laws and fined ₽30,000 for her actions. The Kremlin called her actions an act of hooliganism.

== See also ==
- Association football culture
- Collective effervescence
- Crowd psychology
- Disorderly conduct
- Breach of the peace
- Football hooliganism
- Juvenile delinquency
- Violent disorder
- List of hooligan firms
- List of violent spectator incidents in sports
