= The Long Week-End =

1940 book by Robert Graves and Alan Hodge

- First edition
- Author: Robert Graves, Alan Hodge
- Language: English
- Genre: Social history
- Publisher: Faber & Faber
- Publication date: 1940
- Publication place: United Kingdom

The Long Week-End is a social history of interwar Britain, written by Robert Graves and Alan Hodge. It was first published in 1940, just after the end of the period it treats.

Their story covers a wide range of popular and social themes, including politics, business, science, religion, art, literature, fashion, education, popular amusements, domestic life, sexual relations, and much else.

The Long Week-End has gone through several reprints, the latest in 2009 by the Folio Society.

Historian Adrian Tinniswood named his 2016 book, The Long Weekend: Life in the English Country House, 1918–1939, after it.

== Reception ==
In a contemporary book review in the peer-reviewed Journal of Modern History, William D. Clark wrote, "To write a social history of England from the newspapers of the last twenty years… demands extraordinary powers of selection and interpretation. Mr. Graves has given us proof that he possesses such powers, but unfortunately in this book he resolutely refuses to use them, misled perhaps by the ideals of the Mass-Observation school. The result is a strange unfocused photograph of the times, in which, although the 'camera-eye' has not lied, it has failed entirely to introduce any perspective or integration." A 1941 review by Kirkus Reviews summarized the book with; "a graphic panorama of fads, fancies, facts, foibles and fingerposts along the way from war to war... Thoroughly good reading of the background of those years, if one wants to look back."

== See also ==
- Interwar Britain
