= George Paston =

English author (1860–1936)

- Born: Emily Morse Symonds; 4 September 1860
- Died: 12 September 1936 (aged 76)
- Occupation: Author
- Writing career
- Pen name: George Paston

Emily Morse Symonds (1860 – 12 September 1936), known as an author by her pen name George Paston, was a British author and literary critic.

== Biography and family ==
Symonds was born on 4 September 1860, in St-Mary-in-the-Marsh parish, Sprowston, near Norwich, England. She was the niece of John Addington Symonds, the respected English poet and literary critic. During her writing career, she became close friends with another eminent literary critic, Arnold Bennett.

She died in her home, shortly after her seventy-sixth birthday, of apparent heart failure.

== Career ==
=== Writing ===
Symonds made her first literary breakthrough at age 31, when she anonymously authored a short article, "Cousins German", in the Cornhill Magazine. Her first book, A Modern Amazon, in 1894, was noted by The Academy in volume 55 as having "some wit and a general readableness." Her last novel, A Writer of Books, was published in 1898 and generally agreed to be her best. The book dealt with the barriers faced by women writers within the publishing industry, which was then dominated by men. The social context of her six novels led to her being described as "a writer with a purpose."

After 1900, Symonds turned from fiction to writing biographies, histories, and drama, with many of her books concerned with eighteenth century history and society, and with several questioning the social limitations faced by women and the institution of marriage. These include: Little Memoirs of the Eighteenth Century (1901), B. R. Haydon and his Friends (1905), Social Caricature in the Eighteenth Century (1906), Lady Mary Wortley Montagu and her Times (1907), Mr. Pope, his Life and Times (1909), The Naked Truth (a farcical comedy in three acts, 1910), and Clothes and the Woman (a comedy in three acts, 1922). To Lord Byron: Feminine Profiles Based Upon Unpublished Letters, was left unfinished at her death, but was completed by Peter Quennell and published in 1939.

=== Origin of pen name ===
Writing during a time period when writing and publishing was a male-dominated industry, it was not uncommon to see a woman such as Symonds adopt either a gender neutral, or even a male pen name. The Academy noted that Symonds was "one of the many women writers who have succumbed to the mysterious attraction of the name 'George'." It has been speculated that perhaps she assumed the pen name at least partially as a means "to gain an unqualified entrance into the profession." The particular choice of the Christian name "George" has been attributed to a "mysterious attraction" that the name holds, as was George Eliot, the pen name of famed English author, Mary Anne Evans. Another famous female writer who chose George in her pen name was Amantine/Amandine Aurore Lucile Dupin, also known as George Sand.

Despite her adoption of a masculine pen name, it was no secret that she was, in fact female. The Academy went so far as to question why she even maintained the facade. Ultimately, they simply chalked it up to "a whim."
