= Bullers Wood School for Boys =

Location
- 19-27 Chislehurst Road; Bromley, Greater London, BR1 2NW; England; 51°24′18″N 0°02′28″E

Information
- Type: Free school
- Established: 2018
- Department for Education URN: 145868 Tables
- Ofsted: Reports
- Headteacher: Gary Streatfield
- Gender: Boys
- Age: 11 to 16
- Enrolment: 900
- Website: https://www.bwsboys.org/

Bullers Wood School for Boys is comprehensive boys’ free school which accepts pupils from ages 11 to 16. It is located on Chislehurst Road, in Bickley, part of the London Borough of Bromley. It is a member of the Bullers Wood Multi Academy Trust, along with Bullers Wood School.

== History ==
Bullers Wood School for Boys opened in 2018, with the capacity for up to 900 new school places for boys to meet the growing demand in the area. Initial proposals for the school were rejected in January 2017, and although planning permission was granted that October, the council reversed their decision in January 2018 due to concerns on traffic. For the first few months after the school's opening, students were learning in a temporary facility nearby. Eventually the council's decision was overturned and permission for the school's construction was granted by a government inspector in December 2018.

In 2023 it was rated "good" by Ofsted.

== Governance ==
Bullers Wood School for Boys and Bullers Wood School are both members of the Bullers Wood Multi Academy Trust. Although Bullers Wood School is a girls' only school from ages 11 to 16, it has a mixed sixth form and the trust have expressed their hope that many of the students at Bullers Wood School for Boys will join there. The school has its own governing body.

== Curriculum ==
Students follow the Key Stage 3 curriculum until year 10, after which they begin study for their GCSE examinations at the end of Year 11. Options for GCSE range across sciences, humanities and performing arts, as well as physical education. Students can also take a WJEC Level 2 qualification in Hospitality and Catering as one of their options. Sports are incorporated into the curriculum, and the school frequently plays fixtures against nearby schools. There is also a variety of after-school clubs.

== Headteachers ==
- 2018–2024: Anne Gouldthorpe
- 2024–present: Gary Streatfield
