= C. H. B. Quennell =

English architect, designer, illustrator and historian

- C. H. B. Quennell
- Born: Charles Henry Bourne Quennell; 1872
- Died: 1935 (aged 62–63)
- Spouse: Marjorie Quennell (m. 1904–1935)

Charles Henry Bourne Quennell (1872–1935), was an English architect, designer, illustrator and historian. According to the heritage architect Cath Layton, "his great influence [as an architect and urban planner] can be felt in the houses and streets of London’s suburbs and across the country." His obituary in Nature noted that his books for children and young people had "strongly stimulated interest in the cultural background of the more formal study of history".

== Life and career ==
Quennell was the son of Henry Quennell, a builder, and his wife Emma Rebecca (née Hobbs), and grew up in a house at Cowley Road on the Holland Town Estate, Kennington, London.

He was articled to Newman and Newman, and worked in the offices of J. McK. Brydon and of J. D. Sedding and Henry Wilson. He obtained the National Gold medal for Architecture, and RIBA Medal of Merit and £5 in the Soane Medallion competition in 1895. He began practice in 1896 working with his brother William developing houses at Hampstead Garden Suburb and then with developer George Washington Hart.

He designed a house for Francis Crittall, window manufacturer (Crittall Windows) at Braintree, Essex in 1908.

He designed a house for Walter Crittall, son of window manufacturer Francis Crittall at Braintree, Essex in 1912.

He co-designed a 'show house' with Walter Crittall at 156-158 Cressing Road, Braintree, Essex. the house incorporated many modernist features such as a drying yard for clothes, a scullery, a larder, fuel store, outside lavatory, living room, parlour, three bedrooms and an inside bathroom and hot press.

Discussing the leading English furniture designs of the time, Herman Muthesius wrote in his book The English House (1904): '... that inspired artist Henry Wilson and the excellent designer C. H. B. Quennell far outshine the rest of the group and produce work of high artistic sensibility.' In that book Muthesius discussed certain features of Quennell's illustrations and designs: fireplaces, garden furniture and garden gates.

== Positions ==
- 1912–15: Member of the Council of Royal Institute of British Architects
- 1914–25: Member of the Town Planning Committee of Royal Institute of British Architects
- 1928–30: Member of the Board of Architectural Education

== Personal life ==
He was the husband of Marjorie Quennell whom he met in 1903 at the Junior Art Worker's Guild and father of Peter Quennell. With his wife, he wrote extensively on social history.

Quennell died in December 1935.

His brother, Walter, a builder and property developer, was father of Joan Quennell, a Conservative M.P.

== Architectural works ==
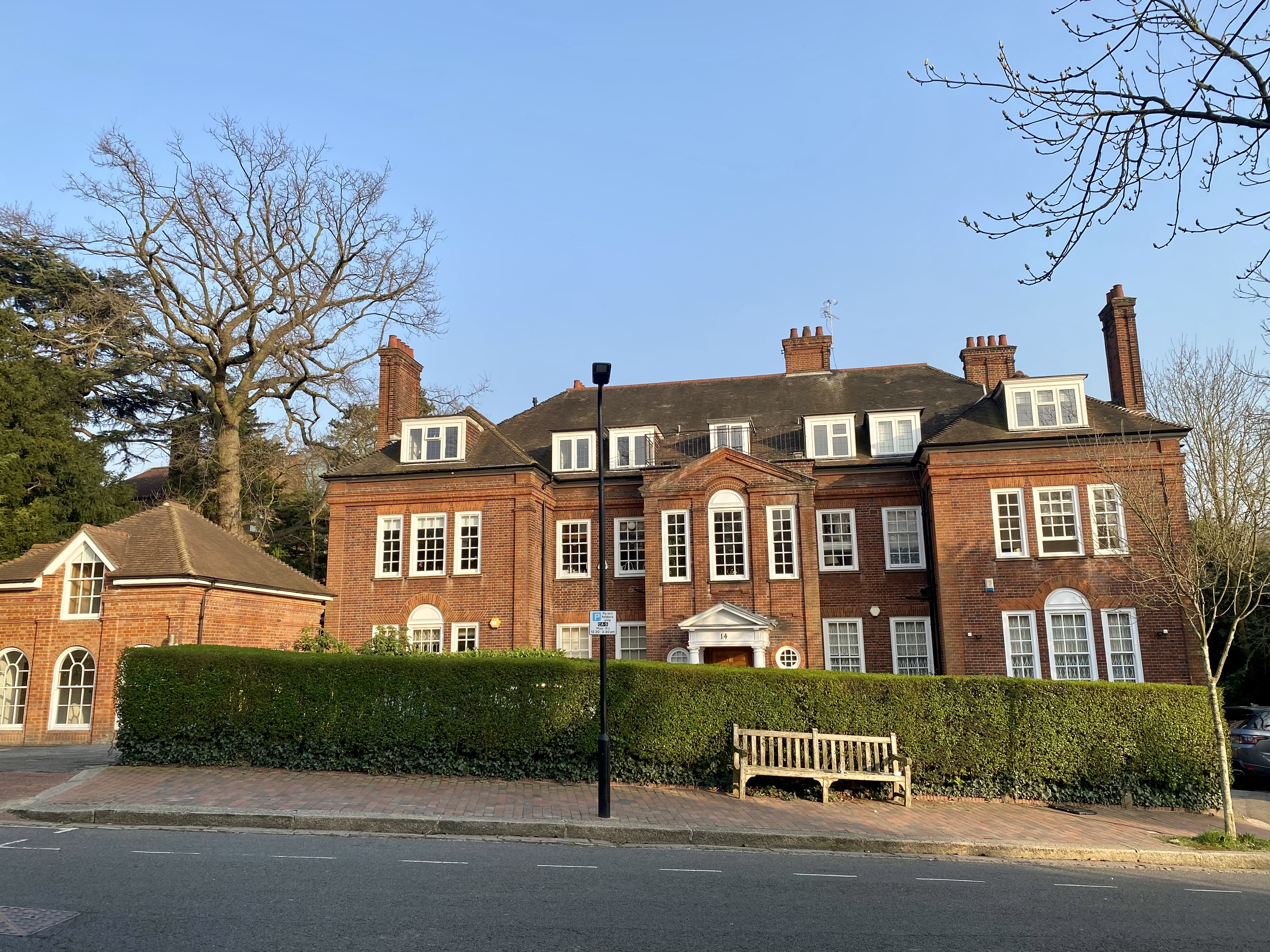
14 Templewood Avenue, Hampstead, designed by Quennell between 1910-11.

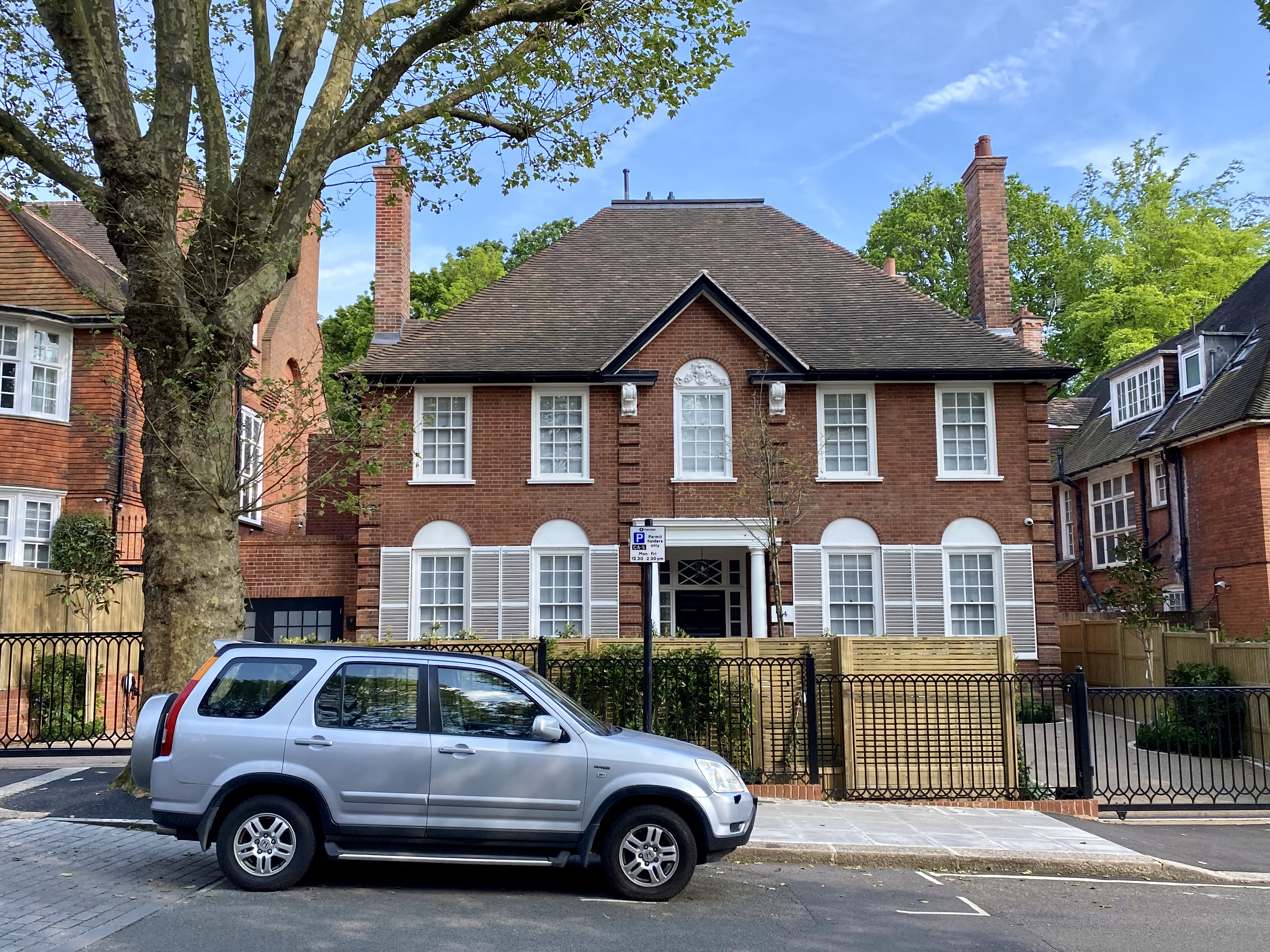
24 Heath Drive, Hampstead, designed by Quennell in 1907.

- 1899 The Chapel, Cambridge House
- 1899 Design for Liskeard Church
- 1904 Gallops Homestead, Sussex
- 1904 Campbell Mausoleum, St Mary's Cemetery, Harrow Road, Hammersmith, London
- 1905 Vale Cottage and Burnt Oak Cottage, Bickley
- 1905 Four Beeches, 3 Denbridge Road, Bickley
- 1905 Phyllis Court, Rosecroft Avenue, Hampstead
- 1905-6 St John's Church, Hall and Vicarage, Edmonton
- 1906 1 Denbridge Road, Bickley
- 1906 Barn Hawe, 2 Denbridge Road, Bickley
- 1906 8 Denbridge Road, Bickley
- 1906 The Grosvenor Gallery, 157 New Bond Street (interior)
- 1907 19 Woodlands Road, Bickley
- 1907 24 Heath Drive, Hampstead (Listed Grade II)
- 1907 12 Denbridge Road, Bickley
- 1907 19 St George's Road, Bickley
- 1907 Halstow, 22 St George's Road, Bickley
- 1908 Southborough House, 2 New London Rd, Chelmsford for F W Crittall
- 1908 10 Edward Road, Bromley
- 1909 21 St George's Road, Bickley
- 1909 Linden Oaks, 24 St George's Road, Bickley
- 1909 Denbridge House, Bickley
- 1910 Englefield, 8 Woodlands Road, Bickley
- 1910 St Mark's School, Masons Hill, Bromley, Kent
- 1911 Hadlow, 6 Woodlands Road, Bickley
- 1911 Lynch House, Allerford, Somerset, Now called Bossington Hall
- 1912 Deerwood, 7 Woodlands Road, Bickley
- 1912 Mowden School, The Droveway, Hove
- 1912-4 Aultmore, Inverness-shire
- 1913 Orchard House, 5 Woodlands Road, Bickley
- 1918–20 Houses at Braintree (1–41 Clockhouse Way and 152–194 Cressing Road) for Crittall
- 1920 Southcourt Housing Estate, Barton Hartshorn, Buckinghamshire
- 1923 Housing Scheme, Aylesbury
- -?- 19–21 Holbrook Lane, Chislehurst, Kent"
- -?- Crabtrees, Gravel Path, Berkhamsted
- -?- 'Crockies' (assisted by Thomas Tait – location unknown)
- 1926–32 Houses at Silver End, Essex for Crittall
- 1926 The Manors, Silver End
- -?- Houses on Eastbury Road and Carew Road, Northwood, London
- 1931 New House, Oak Lodge, 47, Newlands Avenue, Radlett, Hertfordshire

== Bibliography ==
- 1906 Modern Suburban Houses, Batsford, London, 1906
- 1906 A Guide to Norwich Cathedral, (Bell's Cathedral Series), 1906.
- 1910 "Symposium on Town Planning"
- 1911 "The House and its Equipment", Country Life (various articles)
- 1919 "Standard Types of Standardised Methods?",
- 1919 "Berkhamsted War Memorial Town Improvement Scheme"
- 1921 "How to Revive Public Confidence in Building"

Works in collaboration

- Marjorie & C. H. B. Quennell, A History of Everyday Things in England, London, B. T. Batsford Ltd, 1918–1934
  - Volume I 1066–1449
  - Volume II 1500–1799
  - Volume III 1733–1851
  - Volume IV 1852–1914
- Marjorie & C. H. B. Quennell, A History of Everyday Life in.., London, B. T. Batsford Ltd, 1921–1926.
  - Everyday Life in Anglo-Saxon, Viking, and Norman times
  - Everyday Life in Roman Britain
  - Everyday Life in Prehistoric Times (vol. 1 The Old Stone Age, vol. 2 The New Stone Age)
- Marjorie & C. H. B. Quennell, Everyday Things in Greece, London, B. T. Batsford Ltd, 1929–1932.
  - Vol 1, Homeric Greece
  - Vol 2, Archaic Greece
  - Vol 3, Classical Greece
- Marjorie & C. H. B. Quennell, The Good New Days, London, B. T. Batsford Ltd., 1935.
- C. H. B. & P. Quennell Somerset. (Shell Guide.) London: Architectural Press, 1938
