= History Today =

History magazine, founded in 1951

- History Today, March 2024.
- Editor: Rhys Griffiths and Kate Wiles
- Frequency: Monthly
- Circulation: 17,100 (2019)
- Publisher: Amanda Synnott
- First issue: January 1951; 75 years ago
- Company: History Today Ltd
- Country: United Kingdom
- Based in: London
- Language: English
- Website: www.historytoday.com
- ISSN: 0018-2753

History Today is a history magazine. Published monthly in London since January 1951, it presents authoritative history to as wide a public as possible. The magazine covers all periods and geographical regions and publishes articles of traditional narrative history alongside new research and historiography.

== History ==
The magazine was founded after the Second World War, by Brendan Bracken, former Minister of Information, chairman of the Financial Times and close associate of Sir Winston Churchill. The magazine has been independently owned since 1981. The founding co-editors were Peter Quennell, a "dashing English man of letters", and Alan Hodge, former journalist at the Financial Times.

The website contains all the magazine's published content since 1951. A digital edition, available on a dedicated app, was launched in 2012 and re-released with improvements in 2015.

History Review was a tri-annual sister publication of History Today magazine publishing material for sixth form level history students. Launched in 1995, the final issue of History Review was published in April 2012.

== Editors ==
- Peter Quennell (January 1951 – October 1979) and Alan Hodge (January 1951 – June 1979)
- Michael Crowder (November 1979 – July 1981)
- Michael Trend (August 1981 – April 1982)
- Juliet Gardiner (May 1982 – August 1985)
- Gordon Marsden (September 1985 – October 1997)
- Peter Furtado (January 1998 – August 2008)
- Paul Lay (January 2009 – January 2022)
- Rhys Griffiths and Kate Wiles (July 2022 – present)

== Awards ==
Since 1997, The Longman-History Today Charitable Trust has held an annual awards ceremony at which presentations are made to those that have fostered a wider understanding of, and enthusiasm for, history. The main prize in the Longman-History Today Awards is for Book of the Year, given for an author's first or second history book. Since 2003, a prize for an undergraduate dissertation has been presented in association with the Royal Historical Society. The Trustees' Award is presented to a person or organisation that has made a major contribution to history. Past winners of the Trustees' Award include Professor David Olusoga.
