= G. W. Stonier =

English critic, novelist and playwright (1903–1985)

George Walter Stonier or G. W. Stonier (1903 – 1985) was an English critic, novelist and radio playwright, and a literary editor of The New Statesman.

== Career ==
He wrote a weekly column for The New Statesman for twenty years until 1961 under the pseudonym William Whitebait. He was an adapter of Gustave Flaubert's Bouvard et Pécuchet, and his radio plays included Ophelia, The Shadow Across the Page, The House Opposite and Chap in a Bowler Hat. He was a contributor to The Observer, The Daily Telegraph, literary journals and Sight & Sound. He was also author of the well-regarded novella Memoirs of a Ghost and of six other books: Shaving Through the Blitz, Shadow Across the Page, Gog Magog, My Dear Bunny, Across London with the Unicorn, and Pictures on the Pavement illustrated by Edward Ardizzone. He was the first to translate Jules Renard's classic tale of an unloved child, Poil de Carotte into English. It was published (as Carrots) in 1946 by the Grey Walls Press in an edition illustrated by Fred Uhlman.

== Selected list of works ==
- Pictures on the Pavement (London: Michael Joseph, 1955). Illustrated by Edward Ardizzone
- Gog, Magog and other critical essays (London: J. M. Dent and Sons, Ltd., 1933)
- The Memoirs of a Ghost (Grey Walls Press, 1947)
- The English Countryside in Colour (London: B. T. Batsford, Ltd., 1957)
- My Dear Bunny (Homeand van Thal, 1946)
- The Shadow Across the Page (London: Cresset Press, [n.d.])
- Shaving through the Blitz (London: Jonathan Cape, 1943)
- Enchanted Park

== Contributions to other works ==
- Gissing, George, New Grub Street (Oxford University Press, World's Classics, 1958). Introduction by G. W. Stonier
- Stonier, G. W. (ed.); with illustrations by Nicolas Bentley, New Statesman Competitions (London: Faber and Faber, 1946)
- Renard, Jules; translated into English by G. W. Stonier, and with drawings by Fred Uhlman, Carrots [Poil de carotte] (London: Grey Walls Press, 1946
- Flaubert, Gustave; translated into English by T. W. Earp and G. W. Stonier, Bouvard and Pécuchet (London: Jonathan Cape, 1936)
