= In the Wilderness (poem) =

"In the Wilderness" is a poem by Robert Graves, written in 1914 when he was aged 19, and published in his 1916 collection Over the Brazier. It offers his own variation on the theme of Christ's forty-day sojourn in the wilderness, in which Christ is seen as being beloved not just by birds, natural and mythical, but also by the Biblical scapegoat. It has since its first publication been one of Graves's most popular poems with readers and has been widely anthologised, but is less esteemed by modern critics, who largely see it as romantic and sentimental.

== Composition and publication ==
"In the Wilderness" was written, according to Graves himself, in 1914, when, newly commissioned, he was stationed at the regimental depot of the Royal Welch Fusiliers in Wrexham. He published the poem in his first collection, Over the Brazier (1916), and again in his third, Fairies and Fusiliers (1917). After the war he came to consider it "wet" and "a silly, quaint poem". He reprinted it in his 1938 Collected Poems, but only in the Foreword, rather than in the main body of the book along with his canonical works. In the 1940s he came to a more favourable judgement of it, and included it in the 1947 Collected Poems; it reappeared in all later editions, with minor textual revisions, up to the last one in 1975, and even in Graves's Poems Selected by Himself (1957). It was also included in later selections of Graves's poems edited by Paul O'Prey, Patrick Quinn and Michael Longley. "In the Wilderness" has been widely anthologised; Graves claimed as early as 1929 that it had appeared in at least seventy such collections.

== Themes ==
Graves had been in his youth a conventional Anglican Christian, but lost his faith in later life. Opinions differ as to the strength of his religious beliefs by the time that, aged 19, he came to write "In the Wilderness". He later wrote, however, that "The last thing that is discarded by Protestants when they reject religion altogether is a vision of Christ as the perfect man. That persisted with me, sentimentally, for years." This perfect man is the Christ who appears in the poem, so beloved by birds, both natural and supernatural, as to bear a marked resemblance to St. Francis of Assisi, and serving as a model for the young soldier anticipating active service in his own wilderness on the Western Front.

With this version of Jesus Graves pairs the Biblical scapegoat which, according to the Book of Leviticus (16:21–22), was cast into the Judaean Desert outside Jerusalem, symbolically taking with it the sins of the Israelites. Graves, associating the scapegoat with the doctrine of the Atonement of Christ, depicts the two figures together in the Galilean desert, analogous sin-bearers in actual company with each other, in spite of the geographical impossibility, later acknowledged by him, of equating the two widely separate wildernesses.

== Sources ==
The poet himself wrote at different times that the subject was suggested by "a reproduction, in a Christmas supplement, of Holman Hunt's 'Scapegoat'", and by the mascot of the Royal Welch Fusiliers, a goat with gilded horns which led the regiment on parade. The critic J. M. Cohen believed that the pairing of Christ and scapegoat might have been founded on "some apocryphal Bible story", but in this he was mistaken – no such story exists. It has also been suggested that his treatment of the subject owes something to J. G. Frazer's mythographical text The Golden Bough, though it cannot be proved that Graves knew that work as early as 1914. The style of "In the Wilderness" suggests both late 19th-century poetry, such as Christina Rossetti's Goblin Market and the earlier works of Yeats, and Graves's fellow Georgian poets. Verbal echoes of William Collins' "Ode to Evening" have also been detected.

== Reception ==
"In the Wilderness" was from the beginning very popular with poetry-readers. Graves himself, writing in 1928, called it his only successful anthology-piece, adding that he "remains for the public, in spite of all that has happened since, the author of 'that poem about the Goat.'"

Early criticism of the poem was favourable, S. P. B. Mais calling it "Graves's "most beautiful piece of work", and To-Day magazine's reviewer, in a highly appreciative notice, praising its "faultless rhythm...simple and impassioned". More recently, Graves's biographer, Richard Perceval Graves, found it "moving". Other modern critics, however, have been less appreciative, calling it sentimental and romantic. J. M. Cohen, though conceding its "captivating ease", considered it the work of "a literary, weekend poet...little inclined...to introduce harsh thought or strive for compression of line". "One cannot", he concluded, "think of [it] as more than a decorative poem". For John B. Vickery it is "not really...a good poem". Douglas Day thought that "there is nothing about its easy dactyls and its mildly irregular rhyme-scheme to suggest the complexity of thought and expression which were [sic] shortly to come." "In the Wilderness" is, however, considered to prefigure his later poetry in other ways. It has been pointed out that he further developed the themes of Christ-as-scapegoat in his 1946 novel King Jesus, and of the recondite significance of birds and animals in The White Goddess. Graves's conviction that historical truth can be subordinated to poetic truth, seen in his confounding of two different wildernesses, reappears in much of his later work, causing, as Douglas Day remarked, "no little annoyance to the more literal-minded of his readers".

== Settings ==
"In the Wilderness" was set for SATB chorus in 1928 by Edgar Bainton, and for high voice and piano by Samuel Barber as part of his 1969 song-cycle Despite and Still.
