= The White Goddess (poem) =

"The White Goddess", also known as "In Dedication", is a lyric poem by the English poet Robert Graves. It first appeared at the beginning of his 1948 book The White Goddess in a 10-line version, but is better known in a version running to 22 lines first published later the same year. Setting out, as does the book in which it first appeared, Graves's vision of the White Goddess who inspires all true poetry, it declares that he devotes himself to her. It is considered one of Graves's most important and impressive poems.

== Publication and revisions ==
A 10-line version of Graves's poem first appeared on the dedication page of his book The White Goddess, published in May 1948. It there bore the title "In Dedication". Graves then rewrote it in a 22-line version and published it as "The White Goddess" in The Nation's issue for 4 December 1948. This version was reprinted in his 1951 collection Poems and Satires, and in subsequent editions of his Collected Poems. The 22-line version replaced the 10-line one in editions of The White Goddess from 1952 on, though the original title, "In Dedication", was retained. Graves introduced textual variations in the 22-line version over the years, notably in the use of pronouns, I and my being used throughout in some editions and we and our in others.

"The White Goddess" is also included in selections of Graves's poems edited by Paul O'Prey, Patrick Quinn, Michael Longley, and Graves himself.

== Themes and structure ==
"The White Goddess" acts as a manifesto for that tradition of Goddess-inspired poetry of whose "poetic myth" Graves's book, according to its subtitle, forms a "historic grammar". The poet in that tradition, says the poem, rejects prudential considerations of conventional virtue and reason, and instead devotes himself to the beautiful and cruel White Goddess. It describes, initially, the poet's search for the Goddess, the inspirational source of his creativity, whose erotic power he sees as a disruptive force standing in direct opposition to the classical tradition of rational, "Apollonian" poetry. He indicates the "distant regions" his quest takes him to and the appearance of the Goddess he seeks, and finally expresses his eagerly fatalistic response to her divine nature, her "nakedly worn magnificence...cruelty and past betrayal".

== Poetic technique ==
In spite of the poem's Romantic theme, its diction and syntax exhibit a cool and measured propriety reminiscent of Latin poetry, and indeed of that Apollonian "golden mean" which the opening lines of the poem place in opposition to the Goddess, though the iambic pentameter is noticeably disrupted by slight irregularities of rhythm. It also employs techniques drawn from Welsh-language poetry. For example, it uses words with masculine and feminine endings to rhyme with each other (such as know and echo), Again, there are examples of proest, the ending of couplets with words of which the final consonants rhyme but the vowels do not (such as men and mean).

== Models ==
In The White Goddess's dedicatory poem Graves describes the appearance of its subject:

Whose broad high brow was white as any leper's,
Whose eyes were blue, with rowan-berry lips,
With hair curled honey-coloured to white hips.

Later in the book Graves gives a similar portrayal. She is "a lovely, slender woman with a hooked nose, deathly pale face, lips red as rowan-berries, startlingly blue eyes and long fair hair." It is difficult to find a model for the Goddess, at any rate in a physical sense, in any of the most important women in Graves's life. Beryl Graves, his second wife, had blue eyes but dark hair, and her brow did not fit the description. His first wife, Nancy, his mother, Amalie, and his former lover, Laura Riding, were also dark-haired, and Riding's skin was not "white as any leper's".

== Analogues ==
James George Frazer's anthropological study The Golden Bough has been seen as a major source for Graves's poem, providing a model for such themes and images as the church's hostility to pagan religion, the hazardous voyage to distant lands in search of religious secrets, the Goddess's association with leprosy, and the pursuit of truth at all costs.

"The White Goddess" has also been seen as closely comparable with Graves's earlier poem "Rocky Acres", an equally passionate encapsulation of his view of the antagonistic relationship between the poet and society, and with his later "To Juan at the Winter Solstice", another expression of the themes set out in full in The White Goddess.

== Criticism ==
The poem has been the object of much praise. T. S. Eliot, in conversation with Graves about The White Goddess, picked out its dedicatory poem for commendation. Of Graves's biographers, Richard Perceval Graves called it one of his most memorable poems, while Martin Seymour-Smith found it to have "an undeniable authenticity, a quality of genuine vision". Patrick J. Keane thought it as magnificent as the Goddess herself. In 1989 D. N. G. Carter believed it might be seen as "the supreme Romantic statement", which "evince[s] so strong a sense of joy and reverence, awe and liberation, as to induce in the agnostic a suspension of disbelief as willing as ever he accorded to poems of Herbert, Donne or Vaughan", and which "make[s] us feel afresh the holiness of the created world".
