= The Shout (short story) =

Short story by Robert Graves

- Short story by Robert Graves
- Genre: Short story

Publication
- Published in: The Woburn Books #16
- Publication date: November 1929
- Publication place: United Kingdom

"The Shout" is a supernatural short story by English author Robert Graves, completed in 1927 and first published in 1929. It tells the story of a young couple whose marriage is threatened by the intervention of a character with supernatural powers, including the ability to produce a shout that can kill all those around him. It is informed by the circumstances in which it was written, Graves suffering at the time from neurasthenia as a result of his experiences in the First World War, and struggling with his relationships with his first wife, Nancy Nicholson, and the American poet Laura Riding.

"The Shout" has been critically acclaimed: Richard Perceval Graves considered it his most successful short story, Christopher Isherwood called it "sheer terror from beginning to end", while for Martin Seymour-Smith it was a "brilliant" achievement, having a sense of urgency matched only by his I, Claudius, Claudius the God and The White Goddess. Kenneth Allott went so far as to say it was one of the best short stories ever written. It was filmed by Jerzy Skolimowski in 1978.

== Synopsis ==
At a lunatic asylum, the narrator acts as scorekeeper at a cricket match along with one of its inmates, Charles Crossley, a man who believes that his soul is split in pieces. Charles tells him a story which he says is true. It concerns Richard and Rachel, a young couple who awake one Sunday morning and tell each other the dreams they have just had. Richard's dream was of walking in sandhills and conversing with a strange man about the whereabouts of the soul. Rachel's was about the same man walking in the sandhills with Richard. Richard takes a walk to the village church, and there meets a stranger who discusses the whereabouts of the soul with him and gives other signs of being the man in the dream, then mentions that he has spent 20 years with Australian Aborigines. He gives his name as Charles and invites himself to dinner with Richard and Rachel, saying he has not eaten for days. He claims that the Aborigines have taught him how to produce a shout which will kill, terrify or send mad everyone around him, and Richard cites parallels to this in Greek and Welsh mythology.

Charles duly comes to dinner, and when Richard, in Rachel's temporary absence, asks him to demonstrate the shout Charles agrees to do this the following morning. He also steals Rachel's shoe-buckle. Early the next day, without telling Rachel, they go to the nearby sandhills, which are deserted, and Charles explains that his shout is a supernatural, not a physical phenomenon. Richard surreptitiously puts wax into his ears, so that when Charles finally produces his shout he only faints. Recovering consciousness, he handles a stone and for a moment imagines himself to be a shoemaker, then flees back home. He finds that Rachel, only just awakened, has had a nightmare in which she was "pierced through and through with a beam of some intense evil light". Richard does not tell her about the shout, nor, when Charles returns to the house, does she tell Richard that she is now in love with their guest and not with him. Richard still feels ill from his experience but Rachel is unsympathetic. He goes to the cobbler's shop to buy a new buckle, and wonders whether he had handled the cobbler's soul in the shape of a stone. Later, he returns to the sandhills and believes he can identify other people's souls in pebbles there.

When Charles leaves the young couple's home Rachel seems to recover her love for Richard, but later Charles returns and announces that he will sleep with Rachel that night. "Why, of course, my dear", she says, and slaps Richard. He meekly leaves the house, finds the stones, and breaks with a hammer the stone he thinks is his own soul. Back home, he finds that Charles has been arrested for the murder of two men in Australia, gone mad and been taken to the county asylum. Richard and Rachel are reconciled and Charles Crossley's story ends. Charles tells the narrator that he is now Richard but that he still has the fatal shout, which he angrily threatens to use. The narrator runs away, but is thrown down by a great shock which he believes to be a thunderbolt. Charles and the asylum doctor are both found dead, the doctor with his fingers in his ears. When the narrator tells Richard and Rachel about Charles's death they are not greatly concerned, only remembering him as a conjurer whose show they once went to, which Richard had not enjoyed. "I couldn't stand the way he looked at you all the time", he tells Rachel.

== Composition ==
"The Shout" was completed in 1927, at a time when he and his first wife had become involved with Laura Riding. All three had moved to Egypt for a few months, where both Graves and Riding were oppressed by a sense of being haunted, before returning to England. He later stated that he had incorporated into "The Shout" several impressions from his own life in these years: a cricket match played at an asylum in Littlemore, the sandhills on the Welsh coast near Harlech "with an added Egyptian cruelty", and most seminally a few pebbles picked up in the Egyptian desert near Heliopolis from which he claimed he "somehow had the story". Other elements came from his scholarly interest in Celtic folklore and legend.

== Publication ==
"The Shout" remained in manuscript for some time, and when Graves eventually found a publishing house interested in it they stipulated that its length must be reduced from 8,000 words to 5,000. Graves agreed with reluctance, believing that the cuts were excessive, and the abridged story duly appeared in November 1929 under the imprint of Elkin Mathews & Marrot as a chapbook in an edition limited to 530 copies. The unpublished longer version has since been lost. Graves shortly afterward included "The Shout" in an "accumulation" called But It Still Goes On, published by Jonathan Cape in November 1930. It later appeared in his collection Occupation: Writer (1950) and in his Collected Short Stories (1964). The Magazine of Fantasy & Science Fiction reprinted it in April 1952 and again in May 1959. It has been widely anthologized, and translated into French and Russian.

== Themes ==
According to Graves' biographers, Richard and Rachel in the story represent Graves himself and his wife, Nancy. For Miranda Seymour the character of Charles embodies the supernatural powers Graves believed Laura Riding had. Martin Seymour-Smith, however, believed that Charles, and indeed all the principal male characters in the story, were aspects of the author's personality. He believed the thesis of the story was that the poet, in practising his art, becomes a monster, while his beloved becomes "tyrannous, capricious, cruel and sinister": in fact, into a figure he was later to define in his book The White Goddess as the Muse. The critic Ian Firla saw Richard and Rachel as representing the conventional, prosaic, middle class aspect of Graves and his wife, and Charles as representing magic and experience, while the narrator is Graves-the-interpreter who realizes that his poetic faculty might die. The whole story, he considered, can be seen as a metaphor for the practice of writing poetry, in the way the psychiatrist W. H. R. Rivers had advised him to do: that is, as a therapeutic treatment intended to purge him of the psychological traumas he had suffered as a soldier in the First World War. Graves himself acknowledged his identity with Richard, saying that the story had been written "on the neurasthenic verge of nightmare". He came to believe that "The Shout" had been prophetic, the appearance of Charles anticipating the irruption into his life three years later of the Irish poet Geoffrey Phibbs, who had displaced him as Riding's lover.

== Adaptations ==
A film adaptation called The Shout was released in 1978, and the same year won the Grand Prix Spécial du Jury at Cannes. It was directed and co-written by Jerzy Skolimowski, and starred Alan Bates, Susannah York, John Hurt, Robert Stephens and Tim Curry. Based on Graves's story, it departs in significant ways from the original plot but, in Martin Seymour-Smith's view, successfully catches its atmosphere.
