= Sergeant Lamb novels =

Novels by Robert Graves

First editions (publ. Methuen)

Sergeant Lamb of the Ninth (released in America as Sergeant Lamb's America) and Proceed, Sergeant Lamb are two historical novels by Robert Graves, published in 1940 and 1941 respectively. They relate the experiences of Roger Lamb as a British soldier in the American Revolutionary War, and are based on the actual Roger Lamb's autobiographical works.

== Synopsis ==
Roger Lamb, a young Dublin scapegrace, joins the 9th Regiment of Foot and quickly rises to the rank of sergeant. He falls for a local girl, Kate, but she marries another soldier, "Gentleman" Richard Harlowe, who is thereafter an enemy of Lamb's. His regiment is posted to America soon after the outbreak of hostilities with the colonists. There follows a survey of the causes of the American war. Landing at Quebec, Lamb and his regiment move upcountry, and are soon engaging the American expeditionary force in Canada. He witnesses the naval engagements on Lake Champlain, then is chosen, with one comrade, to accompany the Mohawk chief Thayendanegea on a three-month hunting expedition. He learns much about life among the Six Nations, and encounters Kate Harlowe, who has left her husband and joined the Ottawa tribe. Lamb and Kate are married in Indian fashion, but when Lamb returns to Montreal Kate remains with the Ottawa. Rejoining his regiment he takes part in the siege of Ticonderoga. Some time later, near Fort Edward, Lamb is charged with a lone mission to return through the forest to Ticonderoga, there to organize the transport of military stores. This he does, but on the way again chances on Kate, who is giving birth to their child. Kate leaves the baby to be looked after by a Quaker settler. Lamb takes part in a battle at Bemis Heights, in the course of which he learns by another accidental encounter that "Gentleman" Harlowe had long ago married and deserted another wife. Hostilities at Saratoga end with the surrender of Lamb's regiment. They are marched to Cambridge, Mass., in expectation of being shipped back to Britain.

As Proceed, Sergeant Lamb opens Lamb and his comrades learn that they are not to be returned home, as stipulated by the terms of surrender, but kept prisoner indefinitely. Months pass and conditions become more unbearable, provoking desertions. Finally they are ordered to march to Virginia. Lamb makes an escape bid along with two of his comrades, "Smutchy" Steel and "Gentleman" Harlowe. Helped by a series of Loyalists they meet along the way they reach British-held New York. Lamb and Steel transfer to the Royal Welch Fusiliers, while Harlowe is bought out of the army. Lamb now sails to South Carolina with his new regiment. There he takes part in the siege of Charleston, and carries his regiment's colours at the battle of Camden. Lamb's narrative then details a series of defeats for the British side, from the failure of Benedict Arnold to hand over West Point to the defeat at Cowpens. His half-starved regiment wins a costly victory at the battle of Guildford Court House, in the course of which Lamb encounters his old adversary Harlowe, now an American officer, and shoots him dead. They march to Wilmington, where many, Lamb among them, are trained up as cavalrymen, then ride far into Virginia, where Lamb takes part in an attempt to capture Jefferson at Monticello. The regiment is sent to Yorktown, where, as they prepare for the French attack, he discovers that the mysterious mistress of his general Lord Cornwallis is Lamb's own Kate. She promises to eventually marry Lamb, but is killed in the first bombardment by the French. Cornwallis surrenders, and Lamb goes on the run rather than endure another imprisonment. Making for New York he gets as far as Frederick Town before being recaptured. He again escapes, and gets as far as York, Pennsylvania, where he rejoins his first regiment, the Ninth, who are still in captivity. Once more he breaks out, this time with seven other soldiers. They separate into two parties of four to attract less attention. After losing one of their number, and the British deserter who acted as their guide, Lamb's party makes it to New York. Briefly relating the remaining events of his life, Lamb tells us of the final British surrender, his voyage to England, his departure from the service and return to Ireland, his marriage and career as a schoolteacher, and his long-lost American daughter's rediscovery of him in Dublin.

== Composition ==
Graves began work on Sergeant Lamb of the Ninth in the autumn of 1939. Newly returned from an extended visit to America, he was mainly concerned to make a little money with which to support his girlfriend Beryl Hodge (later his second wife), and also his various needy friends who could be employed for secretarial and research work. It has been suggested that another motive was the urge to interpret his turbulent love-life. He had lost a struggle with the American farmer-poet Schuyler Jackson over the affections of Graves's former lover Laura Riding, and his account of the American Revolutionary War might be seen as a recasting of his own story on the national scale. The recurring minor character of John Martin, a Satanic figure, closely resembles an earlier love-rival, Geoffrey Taylor (né Phibbs). Another motive lies in Graves's strong disagreement with the sympathetic, Whiggish view of the American revolutionary cause held by, for example, Trevelyan, which he felt impelled to correct. He may well also have felt driven to immerse himself in a war of the past out of frustration at being too old to take an active part in hostilities as the Second World War broke out, the fact that it involved his own former regiment, the Royal Welch Fusiliers, making the subject all the more attractive.

It was suggested to Graves that he write a novel based on the American Revolutionary War by Methuen, who had recently taken over the role of publishers of his I, Claudius and Claudius the God after the failure of the firm of Arthur Barker. The book was originally to form one novel, but as the manuscript expanded it was split into two novels in accordance with wartime library requirements, the second one being provisionally titled Sergeant Lamb of the Twenty-Third. The intention was to use real characters and events, and stick closely to historical sources, only making them more readable. His most important sources were Roger Lamb's own Journal (1809) and Memoirs (1811), but Graves drew on many others, there being, as he himself said "too much, rather than too little, material to draw upon". When he turned to composition it proceeded quickly, at one point at the rate of two chapters a week. Graves was so engrossed in Lamb's story that Beryl often saw him absent-mindedly lay a place for the sergeant at dinner.

== Publication ==
Methuen published Sergeant Lamb of the Ninth on 12 September 1940, and Proceed, Sergeant Lamb on 13 February 1941; they were reprinted in 1945 and 1947 respectively. Random House published the first novel, retitled Sergeant Lamb's America, on 1 November 1940, and the second on 15 October 1941. Penguin Books brought out a paperback edition of Sergeant Lamb of the Ninth in 1950, and it has since been reissued in the Penguin Modern Classics series. Other editions of the two novels have been produced by May Fair Books, Vintage Books, and Hutchinson. Both works were edited by Caroline Zilboorg as part of Carcanet's complete edition of Graves's works in 1999.

== Critical reception ==
Sergeant Lamb of the Ninth appeared to generally good reviews. Dorothy Canfield assured the Book of the Month Club that it was "finely worth reading", and the New York Times ranked it alongside George Bernard Shaw's The Devil's Disciple, a play with the same historical setting. The Times Literary Supplement found it "has a very taking period flavour and makes good reading", though it also thought the story rather shapeless. George Orwell, writing in the New Statesman, praised the accurate historical detail and convincingly 18th-century prose, and felt that "the book is really a pendant to Good-bye to All That, an act of devotion towards the regiment with which he still feels a tie". Some thought he had not sufficiently digested his historical research, the New Yorker, for instance, calling it "lively reading, with perhaps too much history and not enough novel". But the caveats disappeared with the publication of Proceed, Sergeant Lamb. "[I] have never had so many bouquets plugged at me", Graves exulted, and found an explanation for the difference in tone: "the first volume was a slightly new taste for people and after a time they decided that they liked it, so this one was easy money". Reviewers especially praised the style, comparing it to William Cobbett and Daniel Defoe.

Modern judgements have been more diverse. The journalist Neil Powell and Martin Seymour-Smith, a friend of Graves, agreed in considering the novels potboilers, though adroitly done. Graves's nephew Richard Perceval Graves found them rambling and the central character thinly drawn, but the portrait of 18th-century America wholly convincing. His biographer Miranda Seymour thought the novels deserved their good reviews, and the academic Anthony Quinton believed that the Sergeant Lamb books would continue to be read for as long as anything Graves had written.
