= Janet Seymour-Smith =

English translator and scholar (1930–1998)

Janet Seymour Smith
- Born: Janet de Granville; 25 August 1930; Littleham
- Died: 2 September 1998 (aged 68); Royal Tunbridge Wells
- Occupation: translator
- Employer: Robert Graves
- Spouse: Martin Seymour-Smith

Janet Seymour-Smith born Janet de Granville (25 August 1930 – 2 September 1998) was an English translator and scholar. She worked as a translator of Greek texts for Robert Graves and she became a life-long muse and collaborator with her prolific writer husband Martin Seymour-Smith.

== Life ==
Seymour-Smith was born in 1930 in Littleham near Exmouth. Her parents were Hilda St Hilary Edith Everard (born Mayne) and her husband Lionel Richard Gethin de Glanville. Her father was a physician and she went to school in the south-west and later in North Wales.

She went to Oxford to study the classics at Somerville College. When Robert Graves published The Greek Myths in two volumes in 1955 he had based his work on the translations by Janet Seymour-Smith. She began working for Graves in Mallorca where she was employed as a translator while her boyfriend, Martin Seymour-Smith was a tutor to one of Graves' children. Janet also taught Latin to Robert Graves's son, William. Robert Graves who was their employer and an old school friend of Martin's was a witness at their wedding at Mallorca's British Consulate in 1952. They were still in Mallorca the following year when their first child was born. Another of Graves' collaborators in Banyalbufar was Robert Creeley who was interested in printing. He later wrote his only novel "The Island" which features the characters of Artie and Marge based on Janet and her husband.

She did not push herself forward. Robert Nye described her as delicate and incandescent. She had periods where her husband had to mentally support her. Her husband published poetry but this was dwarfed by his large biographies and huge works such as The Guide to Modern World Literature which at its second edition had 1400 pages and when challenged he admitted that Janet had written some of the work.

Smith died in 1998 in Royal Tunbridge Wells. When Robert Nye published Mrs. Shakespeare: The Complete Works in 2000 he devoted the book to Martin and Janet Seymour-Smith.
