= Armgaard Karl Graves =

German WWI double agent

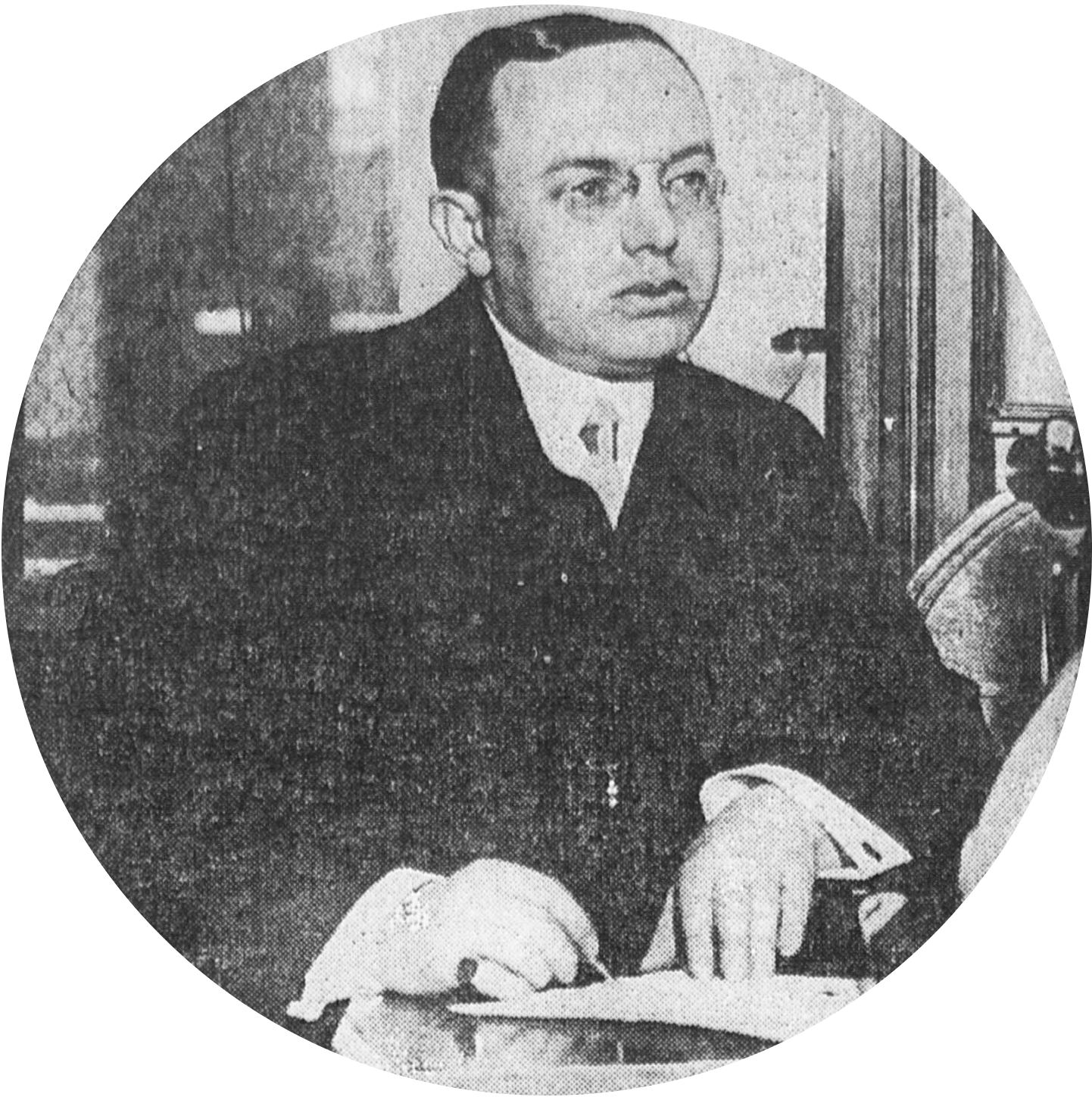
- Graves in a picture published in the Evening Public Ledger 4 February 1916
- Born: 7 May 1882; Berlin, German Empire
- Died: Unknown; Unknown
- Other name: Max Meincke
- Espionage activity
- Allegiance: United Kingdom; Germany
- Service branch: (United Kingdom)

Armgaard Karl Graves (born 7 May 1882 in Berlin, probably died in the US) acted as a mole for MI5, the British counterintelligence service, inside the intelligence-wing of the Imperial German Navy, both before and during the First World War. He was fired from the German Secret service and called a "double-dyed rascal."

== Life ==
Graves left the German Empire in 1898. Twice he was charged with theft in New South Wales, and in December 1910 he was charged with molesting a woman in Colombo, British Ceylon (now Sri Lanka).

Around 1911 he returned to Germany under the title "A.K. Graves Dr Med." A few months later he was sentenced to six months in prison for fraud in Wiesbaden but fled to Stettin, where he was arrested.

During the Agadir crisis, Graves was probably recruited directly from the prison for the Nachrichten-Abteilung at its Berlin headquarters in the presence of Arthur Tapken, Georg Stammer, and Gustav Steinhauer. As' W. Lewis, he was to observe movements of Royal Navy warships off Scotland, especially in front of the naval bases Rosyth and Cromarty, for which he received £15 (£1,528 in 2025) a month.

In early 1912, he reached Edinburgh and went to Glasgow soon afterwards. By post surveillance of other suspects, he was discovered and under surveillance. His return to Berlin forced the Scottish police to arrest him on 14 April 1912.

Three months later he was sentenced to 8 months in prison. On 18 December he was freed, officially on the grounds of poor health. In reality, he had agreed to work for British Intelligence (MI5) for £2 (£200 in 2025) a month.

Graves travelled to Berlin to get a list of spies in Britain for MI5 from Admiralty Chief Secretary Stammer. However, instead of returning to the UK he was sent to the United States by German command.

In February and March 1913 he demanded money from MI5 to return from there to the UK, which they did not provide. Instead, Graves presented himself as a "spymaster" in the US press and shared information about his two employers. On the eve of the war, his autobiography, The Secrets of the German War Office was published and sold 100,000 copies.

In 1915, a sequel of his first book was published, The Secrets of the Hohenzollerns, and wrote for various newspaper columns on his predictions about WWI.

In November 1916, he tried to extort $3,000 ($95,500 in 2025) by blackmailing the wife of Johann Heinrich von Bernstorff, the Imperial German Ambassador to the United States and Mexico, using letters "alleged to contain matters showing her infirmities and failings." His ghostwriter Edward Lyell Fox acted as a courier. Count von Bernstorff, however, considered the material worthless and got the US State Department involved and Graves was arrested. The German Reich rejected the testimony of the embassy employee Graf von Hatzfeldt-Trachenberg in the process and he was released again.

Graves was arrested in 1917 for being in a restricted zone for foreigners in Kansas City and interned as an enemy alien until the end of the war in November 1918. He remained in the USA after the war. He was sentenced to 3 years in prison in 1934 for stealing $1,500 ($36,100 in 2025).

After his release in 1937, he was to be deported, but claimed that Nazi Germany would certainly kill him, so "a government agency" reportedly intervened and took him off the Germany-bound ship. Graves probably died in the USA.

== Confusion with Robert Graves ==
Renowned British war poet Robert Ranke Graves was initially received with intense suspicion when a rumour was started that he was a spy. Jean Moorcroft Wilson, a British academic and writer, best known as a biographer and critic of First World War poets and poetry, stated that "it was unlucky that a notorious German spy caught in England in 1911" had used the name Armgaard Karl Graves, an alias with the same last name as the poet.

== See also ==
- Sidney Reilly

== Published books ==
- Graves, Armgaard Karl; Fox, Edward Lyell (2015). The Secrets of the German War Office. Creative Media Partners. ISBN 9781340508562. - Total pages: 288
- Graves, Armgaard Karl (2019). The Secrets of the Hohenzollerns. Creative Media Partners. ISBN 9780530575254. - Total pages: 266

== Bibliography ==
Notes

References

- Boghardt, Thomas (2004). Spies of the Kaiser: German Covert Operations in Great Britain During the First World War Era. Springer. ISBN 9780230508422. - Total pages: 224
- Bisbee Daily Review (12 November 1916). "Spy Arrested Trying to Blackmail Wife of Ambassador Bernstorff". Bisbee Daily Review. Bisbee, Cochise, Arizona: W.B. Kelly. pp. 1–16. ISSN 2157-3255. OCLC 11363144.
- Graves, Armgaard Karl; Fox, Edward Lyell (2015). The Secrets of the German War Office. Creative Media Partners. ISBN 9781340508562. - Total pages: 288
- Graves, Armgaard Karl (2019). The Secrets of the Hohenzollerns. Creative Media Partners. ISBN 9780530575254. - Total pages: 266
- ""GERMAN SPY" TELLS HOHENZOLLERN SECRETS; Another Book by Dr. Armgaard Karl Graves Professes to Make New Disclosures Regarding the Kaiser and His Court". The New York Times. New York, NY. 27 June 1915. ISSN 1553-8095. OCLC 1645522.
- Richelson, Jeffery T. (1997). A Century of Spies: Intelligence in the Twentieth Century. Oxford University Press. ISBN 9780195113907. - Total pages: 534
- Wilson, Jean Moorcroft (2018). Robert Graves: From Great War Poet to Good-bye to All That (1895-1929). Bloomsbury Publishing. ISBN 9781472929150. - Total pages: 480
