= The Guide to Modern World Literature =

Book by Martin Seymour-Smith

- Author: Martin Seymour-Smith
- ISBN: 978-1-349-06418-2

The Guide to Modern World Literature is a reference book by Martin Seymour-Smith that aims to describe every important 20th-century author (as of 1985), in all languages, in an encyclopedic presentation. It was first published in 1973 with a completely revised and updated version in 1985 called The New Guide to Modern World Literature at 1,396 pages.

The book covers an estimated 2,700 authors and more than 7,500 titles. It contains a total of 33 chapters that treat all modern national literatures individually or in groups. African and Caribbean literature is treated collectively; so are the Baltic, French and Belgian, Indian and Pakistani, Jewish, Latin American, Scandinavian, and both Eastern and Western Minor Literatures. A chapter each is given to American, Arabic, Australian, British, Bulgarian, Canadian, Chinese, Czechoslovak, Dutch, Finnish, German, Greek, Hungarian, Italian, Japanese, New Zealand, Polish, Portuguese, Romanian, Russian, South African, Spanish, Turkish, Tamil and Yugoslavian Literature.

It was perhaps Seymour-Smith's best known work. "The book was such a thorough study of 20th-century poetry, drama and fiction that some critics doubted it was the work of one person -- until they read it and found Mr. Seymour-Smith's distinctive voice and deeply felt opinions in every entry.". It was described by one reviewer as "an amazing feat of a book, about half a million words long; half the size of Proust, nearly as big as the Bible". Janet Seymour-Smith, his wife, helped - "when some expressed incredulity that Martin could actually have read all the authors on whom he passed judgement in that vast but so lively volume he used, cheerfully, to confess that he hadn't. Some were undoubtedly left to Janet."
