= The 100 Most Influential Books Ever Written =

1998 book by Martin Seymour-Smith

The 100 Most Influential Books Ever Written: The History of Thought from Ancient Times to Today
- Author: Martin Seymour-Smith
- Cover artist: Francis Cugat
- Language: English
- Published: September 1998, Citadel
- Publication place: United Kingdom
- Media type: Print (hardcover and paperback)
- ISBN: 978-0806520001
- OCLC: 38258131

The 100 Most Influential Books Ever Written: The History of Thought from Ancient Times to Today (1998) is a book of intellectual history written by Martin Seymour-Smith, a British poet, critic, and biographer.

The list starts in order with the first ten books: the I Ching (an ancient Chinese divination text), the Hebrew Bible (a version of which serves as the "Old Testament" of the Christian Bible), the Iliad and Odyssey, the Upanishads (a collection of ancient Indian philosophical texts), the Tao Te Ching, the Avesta, the Analects (of Confucius), the History of the Peloponnesian War, the Hippocratic Corpus and the Corpus Aristotelicum.

== See also ==
- List of best-selling books
- Bokklubben World Library
