= Count Belisarius =

1938 historical novel by Robert Graves

- First edition (UK)
- Author: Robert Graves
- Language: English
- Genre: Historical novel
- Publisher: Random House (US); Cassell (UK)
- Publication place: United Kingdom

Count Belisarius is a historical novel by Robert Graves, first published in 1938, recounting the life of the Roman general Belisarius (AD 500–565).

Just as Graves's Claudius novels (I, Claudius and Claudius the God and His Wife Messalina) were based on The Twelve Caesars of Suetonius and other Roman sources, Count Belisarius is largely based on Procopius's History of Justinian's Wars and Secret History. However, Graves's treatment of his sources has been criticised by the historian Anthony Kaldellis, who writes that "There are many historical novels set in the early sixth century, but none can be recommended that are both historically accurate and well-written. R. Graves's Count Belisarius ... is at least well-written."

Count Belisarius purports to be a biography written by Eugenius, a eunuch who is a servant of Belisarius's wife Antonina. The novel covers the entire life of Belisarius, with the bulk of the text being devoted to accounts of his life while on campaign in North Africa and Italy. Antonina was often with him during these years, and Graves uses stories about her connections to the court of the Emperor Justinian and his Empress Theodora to incorporate political intrigue and other information into the story of Belisarius's military exploits.
