= Johann Heinrich von Bernstorff =

German politician and ambassador

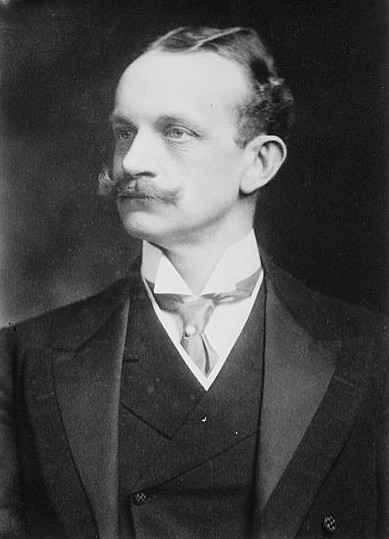
- Bernstorff in 1908

German Ambassador to the United States
- In office 1908–1917
- Preceded by: Hermann Freiherr Speck von Sternburg
- Succeeded by: Suspended due to World War I

German Ambassador to the Ottoman Empire
- In office 1917–1918

Reichstag
- In office 1921–1928

Personal details
- Born: 14 November 1862 London, United Kingdom
- Died: 6 October 1939 (aged 76) Geneva, Switzerland
- Party: German Democratic Party
- Spouse: Jeanne Luckemeyer (m. 1887)
- Children: Luise-Alexandra (1888–1971); Christian-Günther (1891–1947)
- Parent(s): Count Albrecht von Bernstorff; Anna von Könneritz

Johann Heinrich Graf von Bernstorff (14 November 1862 – 6 October 1939) was a German politician and ambassador to the United States from 1908 to 1917.

== Early life ==
Born in 1862 in London, he was the son of one of the most powerful politicians in the Prussian Kingdom. As Foreign Minister for Prussia, his father, Count Albrecht von Bernstorff, had earned the ire of Otto von Bismarck in the Prussian constitutional crisis of 1859–1866. Overestimating his political strength, Bernstorff resigned in a spat over the constitution with the expectation to force his will on the Prussian government. However, the Emperor accepted Bernstorff's miscalculated challenge and appointed Bismarck chancellor and foreign minister. For the rest of his life, Bernstorff would criticise Bismarck's Machiavellian style of governing. In 1862, the elder Bernstorff served as ambassador to the Court of St James's. For the next eleven years, the young Bernstorff grew up in England until his father's death, in 1873. After moving back to Germany, he went to the humanistic gymnasium in Dresden from which he graduated with a baccalaureate in 1881.

While Bernstorff's dream had always been to pursue a diplomatic career, the family feud with Bismarck made an appointment to the diplomatic service impossible. As a result, he joined the Prussian Army for the next eight years and served in an artillery unit in Berlin.

After being elected a member of the Reichstag, he finally succeeded in convincing the Bismarcks to settle the dispute with the long-dead father. In 1887, von Bernstorff married Jeanne Luckemeyer, a German-American. She was a native of New York City and daughter of a wealthy silk merchant.

== Career ==
=== First diplomatic postings ===
His first diplomatic assignment was Constantinople, where he served as military attaché. From 1892 to 1894, he served at the German embassy in Belgrade. After a brief assignment to St. Petersburg (1895–1897), Bernstorff was stationed in Munich for a period. He then became First Secretary of the German embassy in London (1902–1906). Bernstorff's diplomatic skills were noted in Berlin throughout the First Moroccan Crisis in 1905. He then served as consul general in Cairo (1906–1908).

Despite his family's problems with the Bismarcks, Bernstorff basically agreed with Bismarck's policies, particularly the decision to found the German Reich without Austria in 1871. As a diplomat, Bernstorff adamantly supported Anglo-German rapprochement and considered the policies of Wilhelm II "reckless".

=== Ambassador to the United States ===
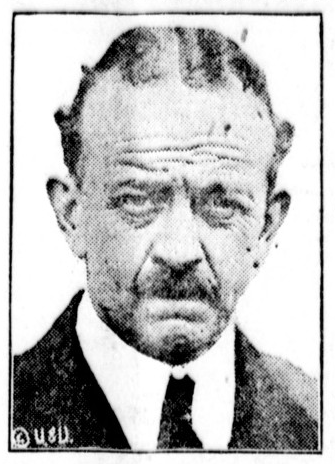
Johann H. von Bernstorff, 1919

In 1908, Bernstorff was appointed the German ambassador to the United States.

Bernstorff was recalled to Germany on 7 July 1914 and returned on 2 August, upon the outbreak of the World War I. Bernstorff's ambassadorship in Washington was characterised by a diplomatic battle with the British ambassador, Sir Cecil Spring Rice, with both men attempting to influence the American government's position regarding the war. That year, the German diplomatic mission also began supporting the expatriate Indian movement for independence.

Prior to the submarine crisis following the sinking of the RMS Lusitania, the ambassador had privately concluded that the submarine campaign was of questionable legality and against Germany's best interests. Bernstorff issued a warning in US newspapers about the general dangers of the submarine war-zone, but this warning was coincidentally printed just before the ship set sail. During the crisis, contrary to Germany's official defenses, Bernstorff believed that Lusitania could not have been targeted specifically, and that it was "obviously sound policy to refrain as far as possible from any attack on passenger ships". Bernstorff saw his role as preserving diplomatic relations with the US "under all circumstances", and frequently acted without or exceeded instruction from Berlin, for which he was sometimes reprimanded. This was most significant in the crisis around the sinking of the SS Arabic in August 1915.

Bernstorff was returned home on 3 February 1917, when US President Woodrow Wilson severed diplomatic relations with Germany after the resumption of unrestricted submarine warfare. Upon receiving the news, Colonel Edward M. House wrote to him: "It is too sad that your Government should have declared the unrestricted U-boat war at a moment when we were so near to peace. The day will come when people in Germany will see how much you have done for your country in America."

=== Sabotage activities ===
As ambassador, Bernstorff was also provided with a large slush fund to finance intelligence operations. He began with attempts to assist German-Americans who wished to return home to fight by forging passports to get them through the Allied blockade. As the blockade began to prevent American munitions manufacturers from trading with Germany, Bernstorff began financing sabotage missions to obstruct arms shipments to Germany's enemies. Some of the plans included a September 1914 attempt at destroying the Welland Canal, which circumvents Niagara Falls.

Bernstorff was assisted by Captain Franz von Papen, later a German chancellor, and Captain Karl Boy-Ed, a naval attaché. The commercial attaché, Heinrich Albert, was the finance officer for the sabotage operations. Papen and the German consulate in San Francisco were known to have been extensively involved in the Hindu–German Conspiracy, especially in the Annie Larsen gun-running plot. Although Bernstorff himself officially denied all knowledge, most accounts agree that he was intricately involved as part of the German intelligence and sabotage offensive in America against Britain. After the capture of the Annie Larsen and confiscation of its cargo, Bernstorff made efforts to recover the $200,000 worth of arms and insisted that they were meant for Colonel Paul von Lettow-Vorbeck in German East Africa. That was futile, however, and the arms were auctioned off.

In December 1914, a humorous British article on his activities in the United States, The Amazing Ambassador, by P.G. Wodehouse, was published in the Sunday Chronicle on 13 December 1914. That month also saw Bernstorff receive a cable from the German Foreign Office that instructed him to target the Canadian railways. On 1 January 1915, the Roebling Wire and Cable plant in Trenton, New Jersey, was blown up. On 28 January, an American merchant ship carrying wheat to Britain was sunk. On 2 February 1915, Lieutenant Werner Horn was captured after the Vanceboro international bridge bombing.

In 1915, Bernstorff also helped organise what became known as the Great Phenol Plot, an attempt to divert phenol from the production of high explosives in the United States, which would end up being sold to the British, and to prop up several German-owned chemical companies that made aspirin and its precursor, salicylic acid. In September 1915, his agents attempted to influence the negotiations between American banks and the Anglo-French Financial Commission but failed to prevent an agreement from being reached. In 1916, his wife was involved in blackmail plot by a former German spy, Armgaard Karl Graves. In July 1916, the Black Tom explosion was the most spectacular of the sabotage operations.

Some of Bernstorff's other activities were exposed by the British Secret Service, which had obtained and distributed to the press a photograph of him "in a swimming costume with his arms around two similarly dressed women, neither of whom was his wife". In 1910, Brown University had conferred an honorary Doctor of Laws degree on Bernstorff. At the school's commencement in 1918, while the war was going on, University President William Faunce read a resolution of the board of fellows revoking the degree because "while he was Ambassador of the Imperial German Government to the United States and while the nations were still at peace, [Bernstorff] was guilty of conduct dishonorable alike in a gentleman and a diplomat".

=== Ambassador to the Ottoman Empire ===
He assumed his position as ambassador to the Ottoman Empire in 1917. Bernstorff conceded that the Ottoman policy against the Armenians was one of exterminating the race. Bernstorff provided a detailed account of the massacres in his memoirs, Memoirs of Count Bernstorff. In his memoirs, Bernstorff recounts a conversation with Talat Pasha after the massacres had been concluded: "When I kept on pestering him about the Armenian question, he once said with a smile: 'What on earth do you want? The question is settled, there are no more Armenians.'"

=== Weimar Republic ===
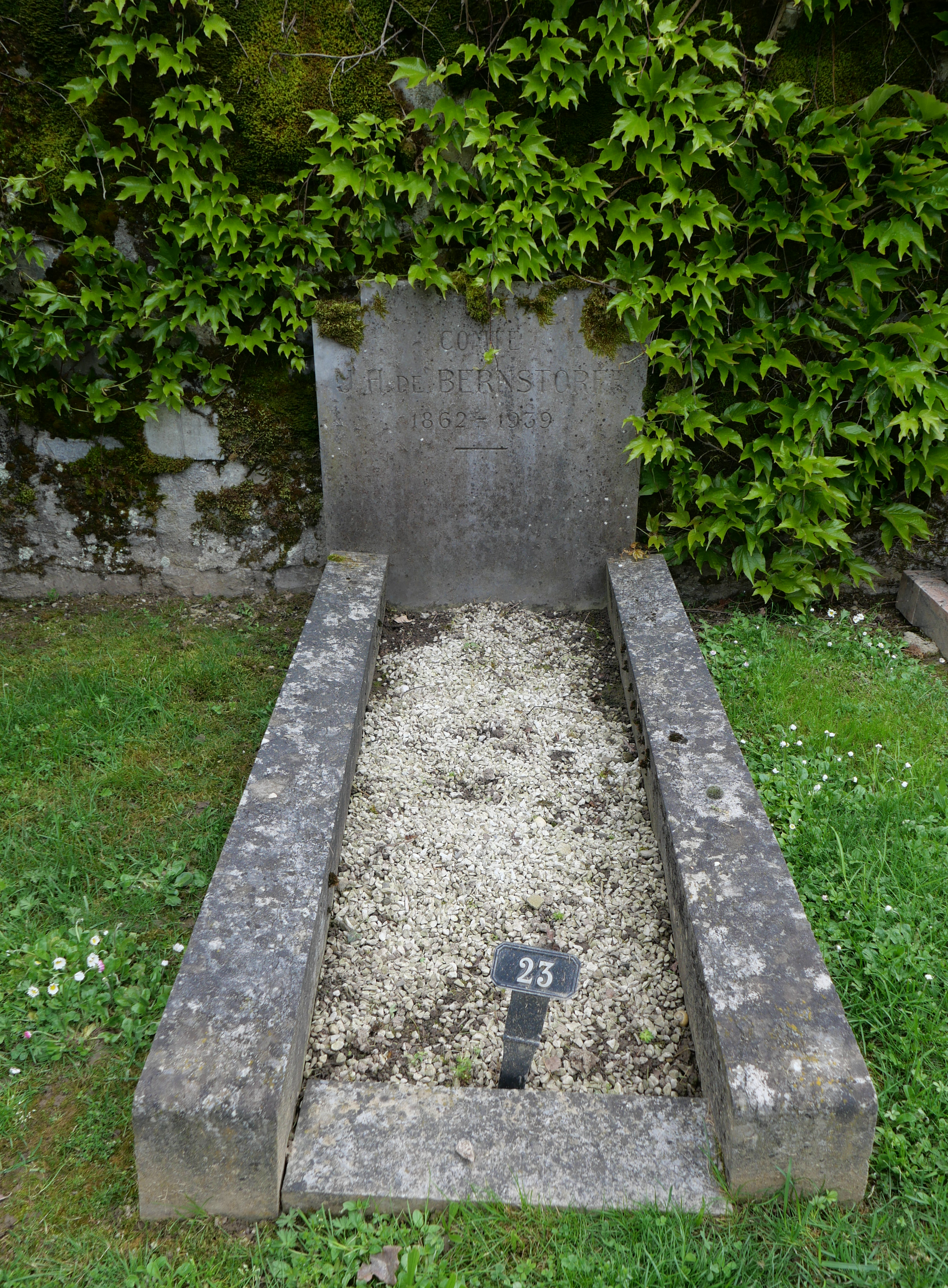
Bernstorff`s tomb in 2024.

Bernstorff was proposed as Foreign Minister in Philipp Scheidemann's cabinet in 1919, but he refused that post and left the diplomatic service. He became a founding member of the German Democratic Party (Deutsche Demokratische Partei) and a member of the German Parliament in 1921 to 1928. He was the first President of the German Association for the League of Nations, President of the World Federation of Associations of the League of Nations and a member of every German delegation to the League of Nations.

In 1926, he became the Chairman of Kurt Blumenfeld's Zionist German Pro-Palestine Committee (Deutsches Pro-Palästina Komitee) to support the foundation of a Jewish State in Palestine. From 1926 to 1931, he was the chairman of the German delegation to the Preparatory World Disarmament Conference.

Bernstorff, who was explicitly mentioned by Hitler as one of those men bearing "the guilt and responsibility for the collapse of Germany", left Germany in 1933 after the Nazis had risen to power and moved to Geneva, Switzerland, where he died on 6 October 1939. He found his final resting place at the cemetery of Genthod, a few metres from the grave of his son-in-law Raymond de Pourtalès (1882-1914), who was his secretary at the embassy in Washington.

== Publications ==
- My three years in America (New York: Scribner's, 1920)
- Memoirs of Count Bernstorff (New York: Random House, 1936)

== See also ==
- Witnesses and testimonies of the Armenian genocide
- Foreign policy of the Theodore Roosevelt administration
- Foreign policy of the Woodrow Wilson administration
