= The Greek Myths =

1955 compilation by Robert Graves

- First editions
- Author: Robert Graves
- Language: English
- Publisher: Penguin Books
- Publication date: 1955
- Publication place: United Kingdom
- Media type: Print (hardback & paperback)
- Pages: 2 volumes (370 pp, 410 pp)

The Greek Myths (1955) is a mythography, a compendium of Greek mythology, with comments and analyses, by the poet and writer Robert Graves. Many editions of the book separate it into two volumes. Abridged editions of the work contain only the myths and leave out Graves's commentary.

Each myth is presented in the voice of a narrator writing under the Antonines, such as Plutarch or Pausanias, with citations of the classical sources. The literary quality of his retellings is generally praised. Following each retelling, Graves presents his interpretation of its origin and significance, influenced by his belief in a prehistoric Matriarchal religion, as discussed in his book The White Goddess and elsewhere. Graves's theories and etymologies are rejected by most classical scholars. Graves argued in response that classical scholars lack "the poetic capacity to forensically examine mythology".

== Contents ==
Graves interpreted Bronze Age Greece as changing from a matriarchal society under the Pelasgians to a patriarchal one under continual pressure from victorious Greek-speaking tribes. In the second stage local kings came to each settlement as foreign princes, reigned by marrying the hereditary queen, who represented the Triple Goddess, and were ritually slain by the next king after a limited period, originally six months. Kings managed to evade the sacrifice for longer and longer periods, often by sacrificing substitutes, and eventually converted the queen, priestess of the Goddess, into a subservient and chaste wife, and in the final stage had legitimate sons to reign after them.

The Greek Myths presents the myths as stories from the ritual of all three stages, and often as historical records of the otherwise unattested struggles between Greek kings and the Moon-priestesses. In some cases Graves conjectures a process of "iconotropy", or image-turning, by which a hypothetical cult image of the matriarchal or matrilineal period has been misread by later Greeks in their own terms. Thus, for example, he conjectures an image of divine twins struggling in the womb of the Horse-Goddess, which later gave rise to the myth of the Trojan Horse.

=== Pelasgian creation myth ===
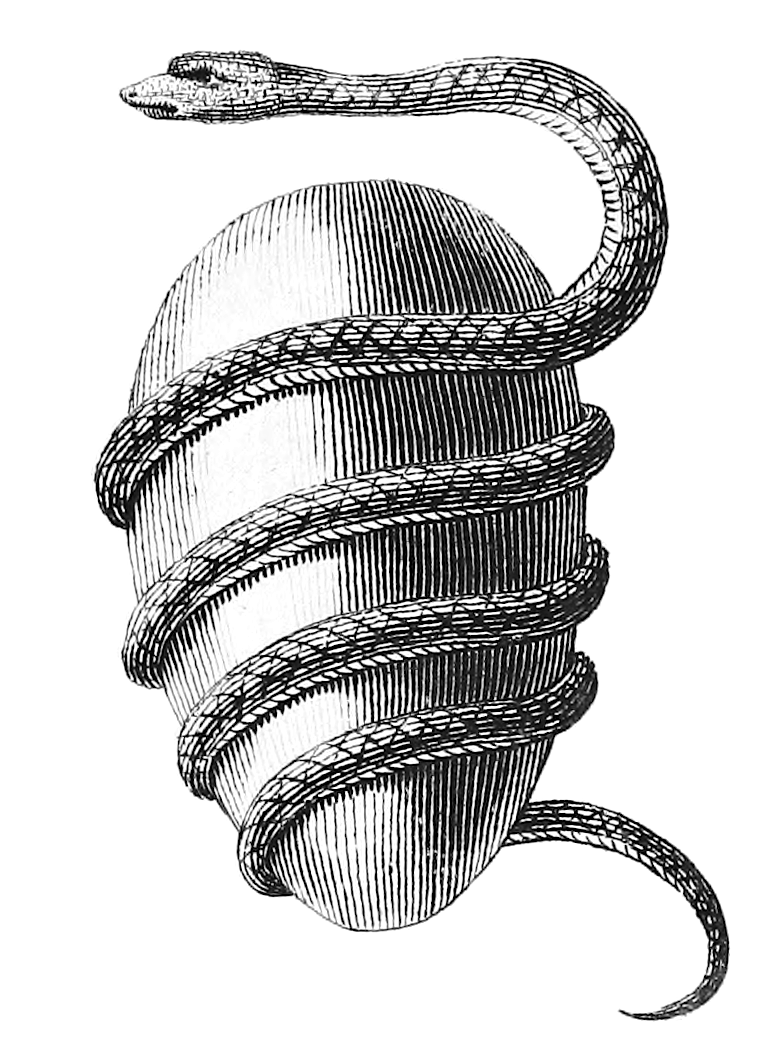
Jacob Bryant's Orphic Egg (1774)

Graves's imaginatively reconstructed "Pelasgian creation myth" features a supreme creatrix, Eurynome, "The Goddess of All Things", who rises naked from Chaos to part sea from sky so that she can dance upon the waves. Catching the north wind at her back and rubbing it between her hands, she warms the pneuma and spontaneously generates the serpent Ophion, who mates with her. In the form of a dove upon the waves she lays the Cosmic Egg and bids Ophion to incubate it by coiling seven times around until it splits in two and hatches "all things that exist ... sun, moon, planets, stars, the earth with its mountains and rivers, its trees, herbs, and living creatures".

In the soil of Arcadia the Pelasgians spring up from Ophion's teeth, scattered under the heel of Eurynome, who kicked the serpent from their home on Mount Olympus for his boast of having created all things. Eurynome, whose name means "wide wandering", sets male and female Titans for each wandering planet: Theia and Hyperion for the Sun; Phoebe and Atlas for the Moon; Metis and Coeus for Mercury; Tethys and Oceanus for Venus; Dione and Crius for Mars; Themis and Eurymedon for Jupiter; and Rhea and Cronus for Saturn.

Also included are the Homeric, Orphic and Olympian creation myths, as well as two "philosophical" creation myths.

=== Olympian creation myth ===
Graves offers his interpretation of “The Olympian Creation Myth” in a brief summary. In this interpretation, Mother Earth is the creator of the Earth as it is known, with water, greenery, and animal life. This creation of Earth was possible through the “fertile rain” cast over her by her son Uranus, whom the goddess birthed while asleep after emerging from Chaos. Mother Earth goes on in this retelling to give birth to six “children of semi-human form.” Three of these children are the Hundred-Handed Ones and the other three the Cyclopes. The role played by the children of Mother Earths three original Cyclopes' offspring is specified by the author as he explains the interaction they would eventually have with the mythological figure of Odysseus.

== Reception ==
Graves's retellings have been widely praised as imaginative and poetic, but the scholarship behind his hypotheses and conclusions is generally criticised as idiosyncratic and untenable.

Ted Hughes and other poets have found the system of The White Goddess congenial; The Greek Myths contains about a quarter of that system, and does not include the method of composing poems.

The Greek Myths has been heavily criticised both during and after the lifetime of the author. According to the classicist Robin Hard, the book's explanatory notes are "either the greatest single contribution that has ever been made to the interpretation of Greek myth or else a farrago of cranky nonsense; I fear that it would be impossible to find any classical scholar who would agree with the former diagnosis". Graves's etymologies have been questioned, and his largely intuitive division between "true myth" and other sorts of story has been viewed as arbitrary, taking myths out of the context in which we now find them. The basic assumption that explaining mythology requires any "general hypothesis", whether Graves's or some other, has also been disputed. The work has been called a compendium of misinterpretations. Classicist Sibylle Ihm refers to Graves's "creative mishandling of the Greek myths." Robin Hard called it "comprehensive and attractively written," but added that "the interpretive notes are of value only as a guide to the author's personal mythology". The Disraeli scholar Michel Pharand replies that "Graves's theories and conclusions, outlandish as they seemed to his contemporaries (or may appear to us), were the result of careful observation."

H. J. Rose, agreeing with several of the above critics, questions the scholarship of the retellings. Graves presents The Greek Myths as an updating of William Smith's Dictionary of Greek and Roman Biography and Mythology (originally published 1844), which Graves calls "the standard work in English", never brought up to date; Rose is dismayed to find no sign that Graves had heard of the Oxford Classical Dictionary or any of the "various compendia of mythology, written in, or translated into, our tongue since 1844". Rose finds many omissions and some clear errors, most seriously Graves's ascribing to Sophocles the argument of his Ajax (Graves §168.4); this evaluation has been repeated by other critics since.

Graves himself was well aware of scholarly mistrust of The Greek Myths. In a letter to Ava Gardner, he wrote:

I am not a Greek scholar or an archaeologist or an anthropologist or a comparative mythologist, but I have a good nose and a sense of touch, and think I have connected a lot of mythical patterns which were not connected before, Classical faculties will hate me, and I will get a lot of sniffy reviews.

== Editions ==
- In two volumes (Penguin Books nos 1026 and 1027), 370 pp. and 410 pp. respectively, with maps in each volume and an index in Vol. 2; Harmondsworth: Penguin Books, 1955; reprinted with amendments 1957; revised edition 1960; numerous reprintings
- in one volume (Penguin Classics) 793 pp, 2012. ISBN 978-0143106715. ePub ISBN 978-1101580509
