= Douglas Day =

American novelist, biographer, and teacher

- On the border between Venezuela and Brazil (Sheila McMillen 1999)
- Born: May 1, 1932; Colón, Panama
- Died: October 10, 2004 (aged 72); Albemarle County, Virginia
- Occupations: Professor, Writer
- Writing career
- Genres: Biography, Criticism, Novel

Douglas Day (1 May 1932 – 10 October 2004) was an American novelist, biographer, teacher, and critic. He was also Clifton Waller Professor of English and Comparative Languages at the University of Virginia, where he taught for almost four decades.

Douglas Turner Day III was born in Colón, Panama, while his father, a captain in the U S Navy, was stationed there and flying patrols in the Panama Canal zone. Although a fifth-generation Virginian, Day grew up in a series of naval bases throughout the Caribbean and Florida. After graduating from The University of Virginia (where he was a member of the prestigious Raven Society), he joined the Marines and served as a fighter pilot. A serious car racing accident cut his military career short, and Day returned to the University of Virginia to pursue graduate degrees in English literature. There he studied under Nobel Prize winner William Faulkner, who was writer-in-residence 1957-58. Graduate student Day's voice can be heard in recorded sessions with Faulkner, and many years later he would write the introduction to Faulkner in the University, a published version of these transcripts.

While finishing his PhD, Day taught and wrote at Washington and Lee University. In his first published essay, The War Stories of William Faulkner, the former pilot analyzes the early short stories about WWI pilots written by Faulkner, who had aspired to be an RAF pilot and may or may not have flown. (His UVa conversations with Faulkner are cited in the footnotes.) When Day's graduate work was complete in 1962, the University of Virginia offered him a faculty position. Day taught at UVa for the rest of his life. He was considered an expert on Faulkner but also championed a variety of twentieth century work including F. Scott Fitzgerald, Ernest Hemingway, European writers such as Nathalie Sarraute and Jean Anouilh, and the literature of Spain and Latin America. He would win a Phi Beta Kappa Prize in 1963 for his first book of literary criticism, Swifter than Reason, a study of the poetry of Robert Graves. In 1974 he won a National Book Award for his biography of British writer Malcolm Lowry, best known for the novel Under the Volcano. R.W.B. Lewis called Malcolm Lowry: A Biography "a biographical work of art." Day also edited Lowry's novel, Dark is the Grave Wherein My Friend is Laid, for posthumous publication, assisting Lowry's widow, Margerie Bonner.

At the behest of William Faulkner's daughter, Day tackled and re-edited Faulkner's third novel, Sartoris. Almost a fourth of Faulkner's original manuscript had been cut by his agent Ben Wasson to meet the demands of publishers Harcourt, Brace before it saw print in 1929. Working from a surviving typescript, Day restored the cut passages and added one passage from the 1929 published text. His edition also restored Faulkner's original title, Flags in the Dust, and the novel was published by Random House in 1973. A third version by Noel Polk has since replaced Day's and is considered the definitive text by Random House, the current publishers of Faulkner's fiction.

Day was fluent in Spanish from childhood and had a lifelong love of literature written in Spanish. As early as 1974 he was conducting seminars in the English Department on Latin American writers in translation, which was unusual at the time, and he was always interested in how Faulkner had influenced them. Day edited and wrote the introduction to The Rural Trilogy, a collection of plays by Spanish playwright Federico Garcia Lorca. Day, along with friend Allen Josephs, had a contract at Viking Press, working with Jaqueline Onassis as editor, to publish a book of photographs and essays on Andalusia, Spain, but the book was never published. In a 1980 essay, Day considers Argentinian writer Jorge Louis Borges's translation of William Faulkner's novel The Wild Palms and how the intimacy of translating Faulkner and close examination of his style may have affected Borges' later rejection of the novel as his own preferred form of writing . Day taught at the University of Zaragoza in Aragon, Spain on a Fulbright Scholarship and lectured and led seminars on comparative literature in Venezuela, Peru, Mexico, Colombia, Ecuador, and Bolivia for the United States Information Agency. His novel Journey of the Wolf is set in Spain, and his novel The Prison Notebooks of Ricardo Flores Magon is set in Mexico. Day traveled and lived in these and other Spanish-speaking countries whenever he could. For Journey of the Wolf he received the Rosenthal Award for Fiction from the American Academy of Arts and Letters. At the time of his death, he was working on a novel about the indigenous Yanomami people of Peru.

Unlike some scholars, Day was a charismatic and accomplished teacher. John T. Casteen III, a former student who went on to become president of The University of Virginia has said that Day was a "brilliant companion and raconteur. . .he could talk about flying and Porsches and photography and ways of thinking with a facility and freshness of perspective that always left us with a wealth of things to ponder and to return to later — and he did this always with kindness and wit." Day was always willing to teach undergraduate literature courses, even at the most basic level. These classes were packed, and front row seats went quickly, a former student remembers, and were often grabbed by student athletes, with whom Day was especially popular. In his last fifteen years at UVA, Day taught creative writing. At the time of his retirement in 2000, he was the director of the Creative Writing Program in the Department of English, University of Virginia.

Day died at his home in Albemarle county, Virginia in 2004.

== Bibliography ==
- The Prison Notebooks of Ricardo Flores Magon. New York: Harcourt Brace Jovanovich (1991). ISBN 0-15-174598-6.
- Journey of the Wolf. New York: Atheneum (1977). ISBN 0-689-10771-4.
- Malcolm Lowry: A Biography. Oxford: Oxford University Press (1973). ISBN 0-19-501711-0.
- Swifter than Reason: The Poetry and Criticism of Robert Graves. University of North Carolina Press (1963).
- The Academical Village: Thomas Jefferson's University, photography by Robert LLewellyn, Thomasson-Grant Publishing, Charlottesville (1982)
- Faulkner, William. Flags in the Dust. Random House (1973); editor, introduction.
- Lowry, Malcolm. Dark as the Grave Wherein My Friend is Laid (1969); editor, with Margerie Lowry.
- García-Lorca, Federico. The Rural Trilogy: Blood Wedding, Yerma, House of Bernarda Alba. Bantam (1987); editor and introduction.
- Blotner, Joseph and Gwynn, Frederick, editors. Faulkner in The University, University of Virginia Press (1995); introduction.
