= Robert Graves =

English poet, novelist and critic (1895–1985)

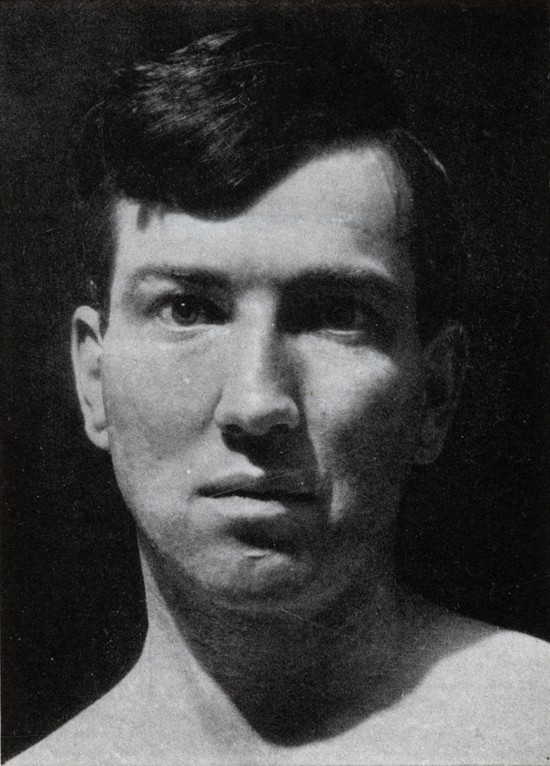
- Graves in 1929
- Born: Robert von Ranke Graves; 24 July 1895; Wimbledon, Surrey, England
- Died: 7 December 1985 (aged 90); Deià, Mallorca, Spain
- Education: St John's College, Oxford
- Occupations: Novelist; poet; soldier
- Spouses: Nancy Nicholson (m. 1918; div. 1949) Beryl Hodge, née Pritchard (m. 1950)
- Children: 8, including Lucia and Tomás
- Father: Alfred Perceval Graves
- Military career
- Allegiance: United Kingdom
- Branch: British Army
- Service years: 1914–1919
- Rank: Captain
- Units: Royal Welch Fusiliers
- Conflicts: First World War

Robert Ranke Graves (24 July 1895 – 7 December 1985), whose second name is sometimes given as von Ranke, was an English poet, novelist and critic. His father was Alfred Perceval Graves, a celebrated Irish poet and figure in the Gaelic revival; they were both Celticists and students of Irish mythology.

Robert Graves produced more than 140 works in his lifetime. His poems, his translations, and innovative analysis of the Greek myths, his memoir of his early life—including his role in the First World War, Good-Bye to All That (1929), and his speculative study of poetic inspiration in The White Goddess (1948), have never been out of print. He was also a renowned short story writer, with work such as "The Tenement" still read.

Graves earned his living from writing, particularly popular historical novels such as I, Claudius (1934), Count Belisarius (1938), and King Jesus (1946). He was also a prominent translator of Classical Latin and Ancient Greek texts; his versions of The Twelve Caesars and The Golden Ass remain popular for their clarity and entertaining style. Graves was awarded the 1934 James Tait Black Memorial Prize for both I, Claudius and Claudius the God.

Graves's eldest half-brother Philip achieved success as a journalist, and his younger brother Charles was a writer and journalist.

== Early life ==
Graves was born into an upper-middle-class family in Wimbledon, then part of Surrey, now part of south London. He was the eighth of ten children born to Alfred Perceval Graves (1846–1931), who was the sixth child and second son of Charles Graves, Bishop of Limerick, Ardfert and Aghadoe. His father was an Irish schools inspector, Gaelic scholar, and the author of the popular song "Father O'Flynn"; his mother, Amalie Elisabeth Sophie von Ranke (1857–1951), a grandniece of the historian Leopold von Ranke, was his father's second wife. One of his many uncles was the officer commanding the Nore during the First World War, Admiral Sir Richard Poore.

At the age of seven, double pneumonia following measles almost took Graves's life, the first of three occasions when his doctors despaired of him as a result of afflictions of the lungs; the second was the result of a war wound, while the third came when he contracted Spanish influenza in late 1918, immediately before demobilisation.

=== Name ===
Graves's birth was registered in 1895 under the name of Robert Ranke Graves. He was baptised into the Church of England as "Robert Ranke" on 1 September 1895 at Wimbledon.

In 1909, Graves was enrolled at Charterhouse School as Robert von Ranke Graves. On 15 August 1914, he was commissioned into the Royal Welch Fusiliers under this name, and it appeared in The London Gazette again when his commission was confirmed in March 1915. However, he appears to have soon abandoned the addition of "von", as during the First World War having a German name caused him difficulties.

On 23 January 1918, Graves married Nancy Nicholson at St James's Church, Piccadilly, under his true name of Robert Ranke Graves.

In Germany, Graves's books are usually published with "von" included in his name.

=== Education ===
Graves received his early education at a series of six preparatory schools, including King's College School in Wimbledon, Penrallt in Wales, Hillbrow School in Rugby, Rokeby School in Wimbledon and Copthorne in Sussex, from which last in 1909 he won a scholarship to Charterhouse. There he began to write poetry and took up boxing, in due course becoming school champion at both welter- and middleweight. He claimed that this was in response to persecution because of the German element in his name, his outspokenness, his scholarly and moral seriousness, and his poverty relative to the other boys.

He also sang in the choir, meeting there an aristocratic boy three years younger, G. H. "Peter" Johnstone, with whom he began an intense romantic friendship, the scandal of which led ultimately to an interview with the headmaster. However, Graves himself called it "chaste and sentimental" and "proto-homosexual", and though he was clearly in love with Peter (disguised by the name "Dick" in Good-Bye to All That), he denied that their relationship was ever sexual. He was warned about Peter's "proclivities" by other contemporaries.

Among the masters, his chief influence was George Mallory, who later died trying to scale Mount Everest, and who introduced him to contemporary literature and took him mountaineering in the holidays. In his final year at Charterhouse, he won a classical exhibition to St John's College, Oxford, but did not take his place there until after the war.

== First World War ==
At the outbreak of the First World War in August 1914, Graves enlisted almost immediately, taking a commission in the 2nd Battalion of the Royal Welch Fusiliers as a second lieutenant (on probation) on 12 August. He was confirmed in his rank on 10 March 1915, and received rapid promotion, to lieutenant on 5 May 1915 and to captain on 26 October. In August 1916 an officer who disliked him spread the rumour that he was the brother of a captured German spy who had assumed the name "Karl Graves". The problem resurfaced in a minor way in the Second World War, when a suspicious rural policeman blocked his appointment to the Special Constabulary. He published his first volume of poems, Over the Brazier, in 1916. He developed an early reputation as a war poet and was one of the first to write realistic poems about the experience of frontline conflict. In later years, he omitted his war poems from his collections, on the grounds that they were too obviously "part of the war poetry boom", though the early "In the Wilderness" was retained. On 20 July 1916 at High Wood during the Battle of the Somme, he was so badly wounded by a shell fragment through the lung that he was expected to die and was officially reported as having died of wounds. He gradually recovered and, apart from a brief spell back in France, spent the remainder of the war in England.

One of Graves's friends at this time was the poet Siegfried Sassoon, a fellow officer in his regiment. They both convalesced at Somerville College, Oxford, which was used as a hospital for officers. "How unlike you to crib my idea of going to the Ladies' College at Oxford," Sassoon wrote to him in 1917. At Somerville College, Graves met and fell in love with Marjorie, a nurse and professional pianist, but stopped writing to her once he learned she was engaged. About his time at Somerville, he wrote: "I enjoyed my stay at Somerville. The sun shone, and the discipline was easy." In 1917, Sassoon rebelled against the conduct of the war by making a public anti-war statement. Graves feared Sassoon could face a court martial and intervened with the military authorities, persuading them that Sassoon was experiencing shell shock and that they should treat him accordingly. Sassoon was sent to Craiglockhart, a military hospital in Edinburgh, where he was treated by W. H. R. Rivers and met fellow patient Wilfred Owen. Graves was treated here as well. Graves also had shell shock, or neurasthenia as it was then called, but he was never hospitalised for it,

I thought of going back to France, but realized the absurdity of the notion. Since 1916, the fear of gas obsessed me: any unusual smell, even a sudden strong scent of flowers in a garden, was enough to send me trembling. And I couldn't face the sound of heavy shelling now; the noise of a car back-firing would send me flat on my face, or running for cover.

The friendship between Graves and Sassoon is documented in Graves's letters and biographies. The intensity of their early relationship is demonstrated in Graves's collection Fairies and Fusiliers (1917), which contains many poems celebrating their friendship. Sassoon remarked upon a "heavy sexual element" within it, an observation supported by the sentimental nature of much of the surviving correspondence between the two men. Through Sassoon, Graves became a friend of Wilfred Owen, "who often used to send me poems from France".

In September 1917, Graves was seconded for duty with a garrison battalion. Graves's army career ended dramatically with an incident which could have led to a charge of desertion. Having been posted to Limerick in late 1918, he "woke up with a sudden chill, which I recognised as the first symptoms of Spanish influenza." "I decided to make a run for it," he wrote, "I should at least have my influenza in an English, and not an Irish, hospital." Arriving at London Waterloo Station with a high fever but without the official papers that would secure his release from the army, he chanced to share a taxi with a demobilisation officer also returning from Ireland, who completed his papers for him with the necessary secret codes.

== Post-war life ==
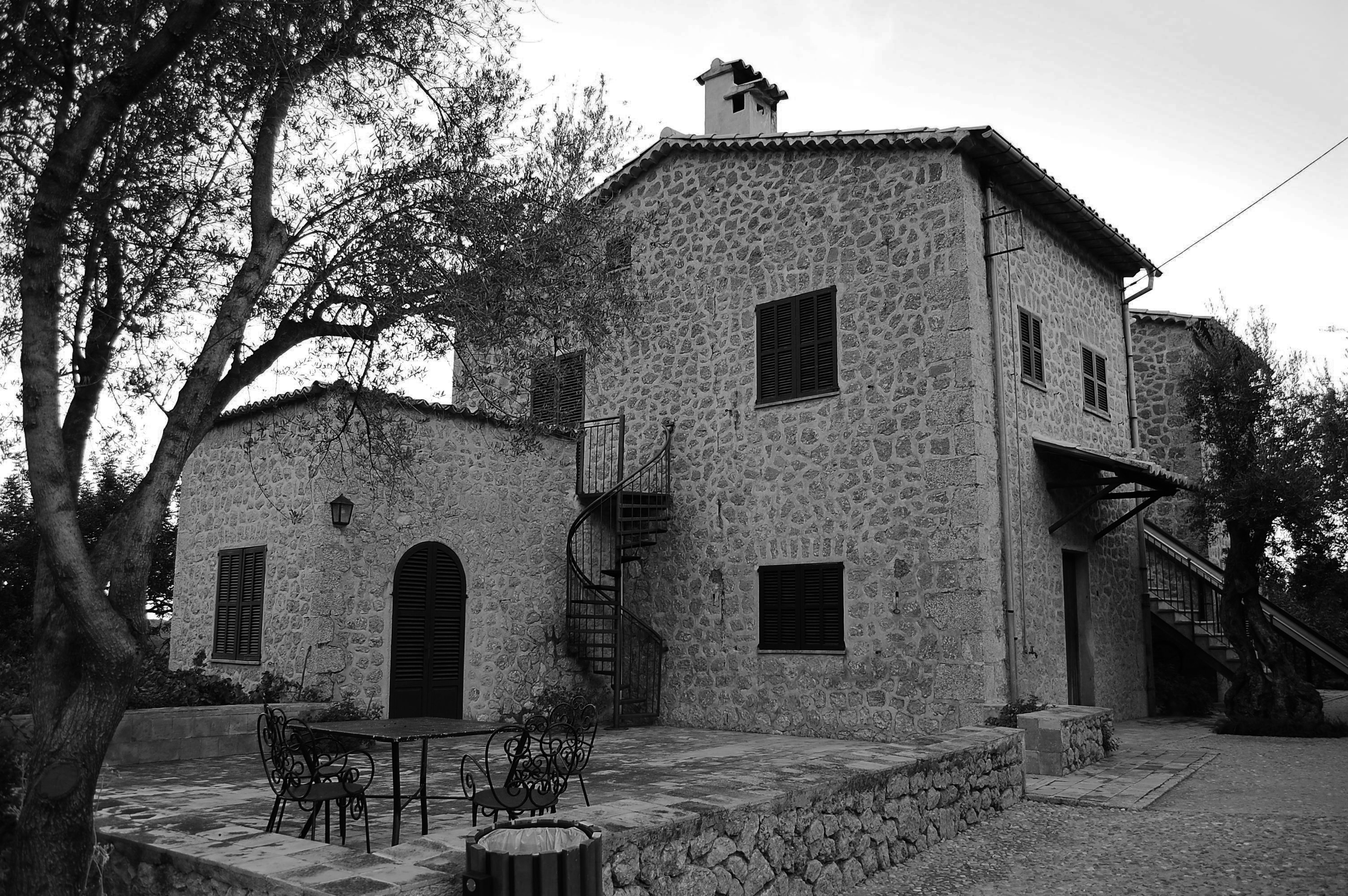
The home of Robert Graves in Deià, Mallorca

Immediately after the war, Graves with his wife, Nancy Nicholson had a growing family, but he was financially insecure and weakened physically and mentally:

Very thin, very nervous and with about four years' loss of sleep to make up, I was waiting until I got well enough to go to Oxford on the Government educational grant. I knew that it would be years before I could face anything but a quiet country life. My disabilities were many: I could not use a telephone, I felt sick every time I travelled by train, and to see more than two new people in a single day prevented me from sleeping. I felt ashamed of myself as a drag on Nancy, but had sworn on the very day of my demobilization never to be under anyone's orders for the rest of my life. Somehow I must live by writing.

In October 1919, he took up his place at the University of Oxford, soon changing course to English Language and Literature, though managing to retain his Classics exhibition. In consideration of his health, he was permitted to live a little outside Oxford, on Boars Hill, where the residents included Robert Bridges, John Masefield (his landlord), Edmund Blunden, Gilbert Murray and Robert Nichols. Later, the family moved to Worlds End Cottage on Collice Street, Islip, Oxfordshire.

His most notable Oxford companion was T. E. Lawrence, then a Fellow of All Souls, with whom he discussed contemporary poetry and shared in the planning of elaborate pranks. By this time, he had become an atheist. His work was part of the literature event in the art competition at the 1924 Summer Olympics.

While still an undergraduate he established a grocers shop on the outskirts of Oxford but the business soon failed. He also failed his BA degree but was exceptionally permitted to take in 1925 a Bachelor of Letters by dissertation instead, allowing him to pursue a teaching career.

In 1926, he took up a post as a professor of English Literature at Cairo University, accompanied by his wife, their children and the poet Laura Riding, with whom he was having an affair. Graves was later told that one of his pupils at the university had been a young Gamal Abdel Nasser, but this is obviously untrue as Nasser was only eight years old at the time.

He returned to London briefly, where he separated from his wife under highly emotional circumstances (and at one point Riding attempted suicide) before leaving to live with Riding in Deià, Mallorca. There they continued to publish letterpress books under the rubric of the Seizin Press, founded and edited the literary journal, Epilogue and wrote two successful academic books together: A Survey of Modernist Poetry (1927) and A Pamphlet Against Anthologies (1928); both had great influence on modern literary criticism, particularly New Criticism.

== Literary career ==
In 1927, Graves published Lawrence and the Arabs, a commercially successful biography of T. E. Lawrence. The autobiographical Good-Bye to All That (1929, revised by him and republished in 1957) proved a success but cost him many of his friends, notably Siegfried Sassoon. In 1934, he published his most commercially successful work, I, Claudius. Using classical sources (under the advice of classics scholar Eirlys Roberts) he constructed a complex and compelling tale of the life of the Roman emperor Claudius, a tale extended in the sequel Claudius the God (1935). I, Claudius received the James Tait Black Memorial Prize in 1934. Later, in the 1970s, the Claudius books were turned into the very popular television series I, Claudius, with Sir Derek Jacobi shown in both Britain and United States. Another historical novel by Graves, Count Belisarius (1938), recounts the career of the Byzantine general Belisarius.

Graves and Riding left Mallorca in 1936 at the outbreak of the Spanish Civil War and in 1939, they moved to the United States, taking lodging in New Hope, Pennsylvania. Their volatile relationship and eventual breakup were described by Robert's nephew Richard Perceval Graves in Robert Graves: 1927–1940: the Years with Laura, and T. S. Matthews's Jacks or Better (1977). It was also the basis for Miranda Seymour's novel The Summer of '39 (1998).

After returning to Britain, Graves began a relationship with Beryl Hodge, the wife of Alan Hodge, his collaborator on The Long Week-End (1940) and The Reader Over Your Shoulder (1943; republished in 1947 as The Use and Abuse of the English Language but subsequently republished several times under its original title). Graves and Beryl (they were not to marry until 1950) lived in Galmpton, Torbay until 1946, when they re-established a home with their three children, in Deià, Mallorca. The house is now a museum. The year 1946 also saw the publication of his historical novel King Jesus. He published The White Goddess: A Historical Grammar of Poetic Myth in 1948; it is a study of the nature of poetic inspiration, interpreted in terms of the classical and Celtic mythology he knew so well. He turned to science fiction with Seven Days in New Crete (1949) and in 1953 he published The Nazarene Gospel Restored with Joshua Podro. He also wrote Hercules, My Shipmate, published under that name in 1945 (but first published as The Golden Fleece in 1944).

In 1955, he published The Greek Myths, which retells a large body of Greek myths, each tale followed by extensive commentary drawn from the system of The White Goddess. His retellings are well respected; many of his unconventional interpretations and etymologies are dismissed by classicists. Graves, in turn, dismissed the reactions of classical scholars, arguing that they are too specialised and "prose-minded" to interpret "ancient poetic meaning," and that "the few independent thinkers ... [are] the poets, who try to keep civilisation alive."

He published a volume of short stories, ¡Catacrok! Mostly Stories, Mostly Funny, in 1956. In 1961, he became Professor of Poetry at Oxford, a post he held until 1966.

In 1967, Robert Graves published, together with Omar Ali-Shah, a new translation of the Rubaiyat of Omar Khayyam. The translation quickly became controversial; Graves was attacked for trying to break the spell of famed passages in Edward FitzGerald's Victorian translation, and L. P. Elwell-Sutton, an orientalist at Edinburgh University, maintained that the manuscript used by Ali-Shah and Graves, which Ali-Shah and his brother Idries Shah claimed had been in their family for 800 years, was a forgery. The translation was a critical disaster and Graves's reputation suffered severely due to what the public perceived as his gullibility in falling for the Shah brothers' deception. It was in 1967 that the first full-length assessment of Graves' work was published. Swifter Than Reason by Douglas Day concentrated on Grave's development as a poet from his earliest work in 1916 to the most recent collection, using Graves' critical writings as commentary.

In 1968, Graves was awarded the Queen's Gold Medal for Poetry by Queen Elizabeth II. His private audience with the Queen was shown in the BBC documentary film Royal Family, which aired in 1969.

From the 1960s until his death, Robert Graves frequently exchanged letters with Spike Milligan. Many of their letters to each other are collected in the book Dear Robert, Dear Spike.

== Sexuality ==
Robert Graves was bisexual, having intense romantic relationships with both men and women, though the word he coined for it was "pseudo-homosexual". Graves was raised to be "prudishly innocent, as my mother had planned I should be." His mother, Amy, forbade speaking about sex, save in a "gruesome" context, and all skin "must be covered." At his days in Penrallt, he had "innocent crushes" on boys; one in particular was a boy named Ronny, who "climbed trees, killed pigeons with a catapult and broke all the school rules while never seeming to get caught." At Charterhouse, an all-boys school, it was common for boys to develop "amorous but seldom erotic" relationships, which the headmaster mostly ignored. Graves described boxing with a friend, Raymond Rodakowski, as having a "a lot of sex feeling". And although Graves admitted to loving Raymond, he dismissed it as "more comradely than amorous."

In his fourth year at Charterhouse, Graves met "Dick" (George "Peter" Harcourt Johnstone) with whom he developed "an even stronger relationship". Johnstone was an object of adoration in Graves's early poems. Graves's feelings for Johnstone were exploited by bullies, who led Graves to believe that Johnstone was seen kissing the choir-master. Graves, jealous, demanded the choir-master's resignation. During the First World War, Johnstone remained a "solace" to Graves. Despite Graves's own "pure and innocent" view of Johnstone, Graves's cousin Gerald wrote in a letter that Johnstone was: "not at all the innocent fellow I took him for, but as bad as anyone could be". Johnstone remained a subject for Graves's poems despite this. Communication between them ended when Johnstone's mother found their letters and forbade further contact with Graves. Johnstone was later arrested for attempting to seduce a Canadian soldier, which removed Graves's denial about Johnstone's infidelity, causing Graves to collapse.

In 1917, Graves met Marjorie Machin, an auxiliary nurse from Kent. He admired her "direct manner and practical approach to life". Graves did not pursue the relationship when he realised Machin had a fiancé on the Front. This began a period where Graves began to be interested in women with more masculine traits. Nancy Nicholson, his future wife, was an ardent feminist: she kept her hair short, wore trousers, and had "boyish directness and youth." Her feminism never conflicted with Graves's own ideas of female superiority. Siegfried Sassoon, who felt as if Graves and he had a relationship of a sort, felt betrayed by Graves's new relationship and declined to go to the wedding. Graves apparently never loved Sassoon in the same way that Sassoon loved Graves.

Graves's and Nicholson's marriage was strained, Graves living with "shell shock", and having an insatiable need for sex, which Nicholson did not reciprocate. Nancy forbade any mention of the war, which added to the conflict. In 1926, he met Laura Riding, with whom he ran away in 1929 while still married to Nicholson. Prior to this, Graves, Riding and Nicholson adopted a triadic relationship they called "The Trinity". Despite the implications, Riding and Nicholson were most likely heterosexual. This triangle became the "Holy Circle" with the addition of Irish poet Geoffrey Phibbs, who himself was still married to Irish artist Norah McGuinness. This relationship revolved around the worship and reverence of Riding. Graves and Phibbs were both to sleep with Riding. When Phibbs attempted to leave the relationship, Graves was sent to track him down, even threatening to kill Phibbs if he did not return to the circle. When Phibbs resisted, Riding threw herself out of a window, Graves following suit to reach her. Graves's commitment to Riding was so strong that he entered, on her word, a period of enforced celibacy, "which he had not enjoyed".

By 1938, no longer entranced by Riding, Graves fell in love with the then-married Beryl Hodge. In 1950, after much dispute with Nicholson (whom he had not divorced yet), he married Beryl. Despite having a loving marriage with Beryl, Graves would take on a 17-year-old muse, Judith Bledsoe, in 1950. Although the relationship was described as "not overtly sexual", in 1952 Graves attacked Judith's new fiancé, getting the police called on him in the process. He later had three successive female muses, who came to dominate his poetry.

== Death and legacy ==
=== Death ===
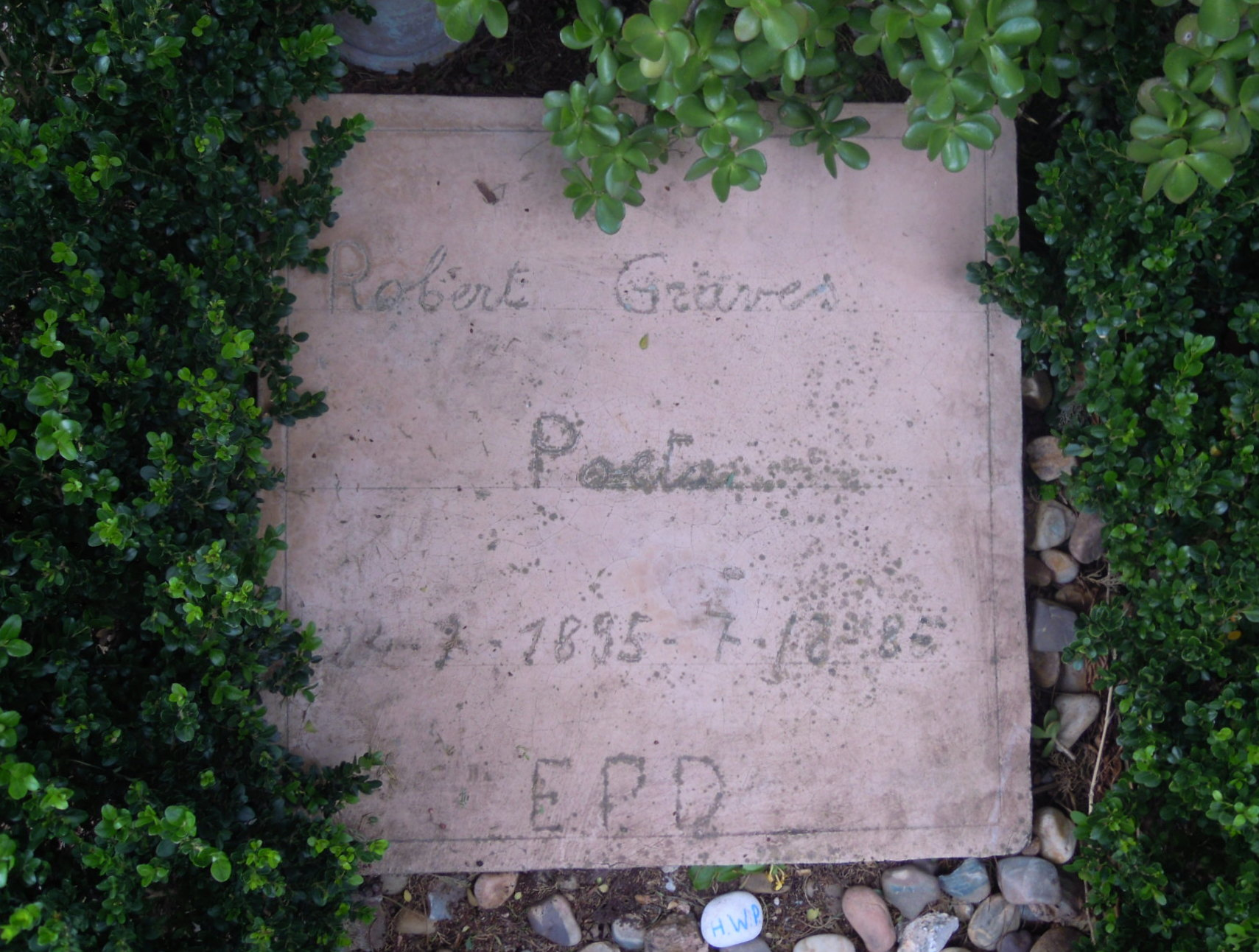
Grave of Robert Graves

During the early 1970s, Graves began to experience increasingly severe memory loss. By his 80th birthday in 1975, he had come to the end of his working life. He died of heart failure on 7 December 1985 at the age of 90 years. His body was buried the next morning in the small churchyard on a hill at Deià, at the site of a shrine that had once been sacred to the White Goddess of Pelion. His second wife, Beryl Graves, died on 27 October 2003, at age 88.

=== Memorials ===
Three of his former houses have a blue plaque on them: in Wimbledon, Brixham, and Islip.

On 11 November 1985, Graves was among sixteen Great War poets commemorated on a slate stone unveiled in Westminster Abbey's Poets' Corner. The inscription on the stone was taken from Wilfred Owen's "Preface" to his poems and reads: "My subject is War, and the pity of War. The Poetry is in the pity." Of the 16 poets, Graves was the only one still living at the time of the commemoration ceremony, though he would die less than a month later.

=== Children ===
Graves had eight children. With his first wife, Nancy Nicholson (1899–1977), he had Jennie (who married journalist Alexander Clifford), David (who was killed in the Second World War), Catherine (who married nuclear scientist Clifford Dalton at Aldershot), and Sam. With his second wife, Beryl Pritchard Hodge (1915–2003), he had William (author of the well-received memoir Wild Olives: Life on Majorca with Robert Graves), Lucia (a translator and author whose versions of novels by Carlos Ruiz Zafón have been quite successful commercially), Juan (addressed in one of Robert Graves' most famous and critically praised poems, "To Juan at the Winter Solstice"), and Tomás (a writer and musician).

=== Awards ===
UK government documents released in 2012 indicate that Graves turned down a CBE in 1957. In 2012, the Nobel Records were opened after 50 years, and it was revealed that Graves was among a shortlist of authors considered for the 1962 Nobel Prize in Literature, along with John Steinbeck (who was that year's recipient of the prize), Lawrence Durrell, Jean Anouilh and Karen Blixen. Graves was rejected because, even though he had written several historical novels, he was still primarily seen as a poet, and committee member Henry Olsson was reluctant to award any Anglo-Saxon poet the prize before the death of Ezra Pound, believing that other writers did not match his talent. UK government documents released in 2023 reveal that in 1967 Graves was considered for, but then passed over for, the post of Poet Laureate.

== Bibliography ==
=== Poetry collections ===
- Over the Brazier. London: The Poetry Bookshop, 1916; New York: Alfred. A. Knopf, 1923.
- Goliath and David. London: Chiswick Press, 1916.
- Country Sentiment, London: Martin Secker, 1920; New York, Alfred A. Knopf, 1920
- The Feather Bed. Richmond, Surrey: Hogarth Press, 1923.
- Mock Beggar Hall. London: Hogarth Press, 1924.
- Welchmans Hose. London: The Fleuron, 1925.
- Poems. London: Ernest Benn, 1925.
- The Marmosites Miscellany (as John Doyle). London: Hogarth Press, 1925.
- Poems (1914–1926). London: William Heinemann, 1927; Garden City, NY: Doubleday, 1929.
- Poems (1926–1930). London: William Heinemann
- To Whom Else? Deià, Mallorca: Seizin Press, 1931.
- Poems 1930–1933. London: Arthur Barker, 1933.
- Collected Poems. London: Cassell, 1938; New York: Random House, 1938.
- No More Ghosts: Selected Poems. London: Faber & Faber, 1940.
- Work in Hand, with Norman Cameron and Alan Hodge. London: Hogarth Press, 1942.
- Poems. London: Eyre & Spottiswoode, 1943.
- Poems 1938–1945. London: Cassell, 1945; New York: Creative Age Press, 1946.
- Collected Poems (1914–1947). London: Cassell, 1948.
- Poems and Satires. London: Cassell, 1951.
- Poems 1953. London: Cassell, 1953.
- Collected Poems 1955. New York: Doubleday, 1955.
- Poems Selected by Himself. Harmondsworth: Penguin, 1957; rev. 1961, 1966, 1972, 1978.
- The Poems of Robert Graves. New York: Doubleday, 1958.
- Collected Poems 1959. London: Cassell, 1959.
- The Penny Fiddle: Poems for Children. London: Cassell, 1960; New York: Doubleday, 1961.
- More Poems 1961. London: Cassell, 1961.
- Collected Poems. New York: Doubleday, 1961.
- New Poems 1962. London: Cassell, 1962; as New Poems. New York: Doubleday, 1963.
- The More Deserving Cases: Eighteen Old Poems for Reconsideration. Marlborough College Press, 1962.
- Man Does, Woman Is. London: Cassell, 1964/New York: Doubleday, 1964.
- Ann at Highwood Hall: Poems for Children. London: Cassell, 1964; New York: Triangle Square, 2017.
- Love Respelt. London: Cassell, 1965/New York: Doubleday, 1966.
- Collected Poems, 1965. London: Cassell, 1965.
- Seventeen Poems Missing from "Love Respelt". privately printed, 1966.
- Colophon to "Love Respelt". Privately printed, 1967.
- Poems 1965–1968. London: Cassell, 1968; New York: Doubleday, 1969.
- Poems About Love. London: Cassell, 1969; New York: Doubleday, 1969.
- Love Respelt Again. New York: Doubleday, 1969.
- Beyond Giving. privately printed, 1969.
- Poems 1968–1970. London: Cassell, 1970; New York: Doubleday, 1971.
- The Green-Sailed Vessel. privately printed, 1971.
- Poems: Abridged for Dolls and Princes. London: Cassell, 1971.
- Poems 1970–1972. London: Cassell, 1972; New York: Doubleday, 1973.
- Deyá, A Portfolio. London: Motif Editions, 1972.
- Timeless Meeting: Poems. privately printed, 1973.
- At the Gate. privately printed, London, 1974.
- Collected Poems 1975. London: Cassell, 1975.
- New Collected Poems. New York: Doubleday, 1977.
- Selected Poems, ed. Paul O'Prey. London: Penguin, 1986
- The Centenary Selected Poems, ed. Patrick Quinn. Manchester: Carcanet Press, 1995.
- Complete Poems Volume 1, ed. Beryl Graves and Dunstan Ward. Manchester: Carcanet Press, 1995.
- Complete Poems Volume 2, ed. Beryl Graves and Dunstan Ward. Manchester: Carcanet Press, 1996.
- Complete Poems Volume 3, ed. Beryl Graves and Dunstan Ward. Manchester: Carcanet Press, 1999.
- The Complete Poems in One Volume, ed. Beryl Graves and Dunstan Ward. Manchester: Penguin Books, 2004.
- Selected Poems, ed. Michael Longley. Faber & Faber, 2012.

=== Fiction ===
- My Head! My Head!. London: Secker, 1925; Alfred. A. Knopf, New York, 1925.
- The Shout. London: Mathews & Marrot, 1929.
- No Decency Left. (with Laura Riding) (as Barbara Rich). London: Jonathan Cape, 1932.
- The Real David Copperfield. London: Arthur Barker, 1933; as David Copperfield, by Charles Dickens, Condensed by Robert Graves, ed. M. P. Paine. New York: Harcourt, Brace, 1934.
- I, Claudius. London: Arthur Barker, 1934; New York: Smith & Haas, 1934.
  - Sequel: Claudius the God and his Wife Messalina. London: Arthur Barker, 1934; New York: Smith & Haas, 1935.
- Antigua, Penny, Puce. Deià, Mallorca/London: Seizin Press/Constable, 1936; New York: Random House, 1937.
- Count Belisarius. London: Cassell, 1938: Random House, New York, 1938.
- Sergeant Lamb of the Ninth. London: Methuen, 1940; as Sergeant Lamb's America. New York: Random House, 1940.
  - Sequel: Proceed, Sergeant Lamb. London: Methuen, 1941; New York: Random House, 1941.
- The Story of Marie Powell: Wife to Mr. Milton. London: Cassell, 1943; as Wife to Mr Milton: The Story of Marie Powell. New York: Creative Age Press, 1944.
- The Golden Fleece. London: Cassell, 1944; as Hercules, My Shipmate, New York: Creative Age Press, 1945; New York: Seven Stories Press, 2017.
- King Jesus. New York: Creative Age Press, 1946; London: Cassell, 1946.
- Watch the North Wind Rise. New York: Creative Age Press, 1949; as Seven Days in New Crete. London: Cassell, 1949.
- The Islands of Unwisdom. New York: Doubleday, 1949; as The Isles of Unwisdom. London: Cassell, 1950.
- Homer's Daughter. London: Cassell, 1955; New York: Doubleday, 1955; New York: Seven Stories Press, 2017.
- Catacrok! Mostly Stories, Mostly Funny. London: Cassell, 1956.
- They Hanged My Saintly Billy. London: Cassell, 1957; New York: Doubleday, 1957; New York, Seven Stories Press, 2017.
- Collected Short Stories. Doubleday: New York, 1964; Cassell, London, 1965.
- An Ancient Castle. London: Peter Owen, 1980.

=== Other works ===
- On English Poetry. New York: Alfred. A. Knopf, 1922; London: Heinemann, 1922.
- The Meaning of Dreams. London: Cecil Palmer, 1924; New York: Greenberg, 1925.
- Poetic Unreason and Other Studies. London: Cecil Palmer, 1925.
- Contemporary Techniques of Poetry: A Political Analogy. London: Hogarth Press, 1925.
- John Kemp's Wager: A Ballad Opera. Oxford: Basil Blackwell, 1925.
- Another Future of Poetry. London: Hogarth Press, 1926.
- Impenetrability or the Proper Habit of English. London: Hogarth Press, 1927.
- The English Ballad: A Short Critical Survey. London: Ernest Benn, 1927; revised as English and Scottish Ballads. London: William Heinemann, 1957; New York: Macmillan, 1957.
- Lars Porsena or the Future of Swearing and Improper Language. London: Kegan Paul, Trench, Trubner, 1927; E. P. Dutton, New York, 1927; revised as The Future of Swearing and Improper Language. London: Kegan Paul, Trench, Trubner, 1936.
- A Survey of Modernist Poetry (with Laura Riding). London: William Heinemann, 1927; New York: Doubleday, 1928.
- Lawrence and the Arabs. London: Jonathan Cape, 1927; as Lawrence and the Arabian Adventure. New York: Doubleday, 1928.
- A Pamphlet Against Anthologies (with Laura Riding). London: Jonathan Cape, 1928; as Against Anthologies. New York: Doubleday, 1928.
- Mrs. Fisher or the Future of Humour. London: Kegan Paul, Trench, Trubner, 1928.
- Good-bye to All That: An Autobiography. London: Jonathan Cape, 1929; New York: Jonathan Cape and Smith, 1930; rev., New York: Doubleday, 1957; London: Cassell, 1957; Penguin: Harmondsworth, 1960.
- But It Still Goes On: An Accumulation. London: Jonathan Cape, 1930; New York: Jonathan Cape and Smith, 1931.
- T. E. Lawrence to His Biographer Robert Graves. New York: Doubleday, 1938; London: Faber & Faber, 1939.
- The Long Weekend (with Alan Hodge). London: Faber & Faber, 1940; New York: Macmillan, 1941.
- The Reader Over Your Shoulder (with Alan Hodge). London: Jonathan Cape, 1943; New York: Macmillan, 1943; New York, Seven Stories Press, 2017.
- The White Goddess. London: Faber & Faber, 1948; New York: Creative Age Press, 1948; rev., London: Faber & Faber, 1952, 1961; New York: Alfred. A. Knopf, 1958.
- The Common Asphodel: Collected Essays on Poetry 1922–1949. London: Hamish Hamilton, 1949.
- Occupation: Writer. New York: Creative Age Press, 1950; London: Cassell, 1951.
- The Golden Ass of Apuleius, New York: Farrar, Straus, 1951.
- The Nazarene Gospel Restored (with Joshua Podro). London: Cassell, 1953; New York: Doubleday, 1954.
- The Greek Myths. London: Penguin, 1955; Baltimore: Penguin, 1955.
- The Crowning Privilege: The Clark Lectures, 1954–1955. London: Cassell, 1955; New York: Doubleday, 1956.
- Adam's Rib. London: Trianon Press, 1955; New York: Yoseloff, 1958.
- Jesus in Rome (with Joshua Podro). London: Cassell, 1957.
- Steps. London: Cassell, 1958.
- 5 Pens in Hand. New York: Doubleday, 1958.
- The Anger of Achilles. New York: Doubleday, 1959.
- Food for Centaurs. New York: Doubleday, 1960.
- Greek Gods and Heroes. New York: Doubleday, 1960; as Myths of Ancient Greece. London: Cassell, 1961.
- 5 November address, X magazine, Volume One, Number Three, June 1960; An Anthology from X (Oxford University Press 1988).
- Selected Poetry and Prose (ed. James Reeves). London: Hutchinson, 1961.
- Oxford Addresses on Poetry. London: Cassell, 1962; New York: Doubleday, 1962.
- The Siege and Fall of Troy. London: Cassell, 1962; New York: Doubleday, 1963; New York, Seven Stories Press, 2017.
- The Big Green Book. New York: Crowell Collier, 1962; Penguin: Harmondsworth, 1978. Illustrated by Maurice Sendak
- The Twelve Caesars. Harmondsworth: Penguin, 1957, revised by James B. Rives, 2007
- Hebrew Myths: The Book of Genesis (with Raphael Patai). New York: Doubleday, 1964; London: Cassell, 1964.
- Majorca Observed. London: Cassell, 1965; New York: Doubleday, 1965.
- Mammon and the Black Goddess. London: Cassell, 1965; New York: Doubleday, 1965.
- Two Wise Children. New York: Harlin Quist, 1966; London: Harlin Quist, 1967.
- The Rubaiyyat of Omar Khayyam (with Omar Ali-Shah). London: Cassell, 1967.
- Poetic Craft and Principle. London: Cassell, 1967.
- The Poor Boy Who Followed His Star. London: Cassell, 1968; New York: Doubleday, 1969.
- Greek Myths and Legends. London: Cassell, 1968.
- The Crane Bag. London: Cassell, 1969.
- On Poetry: Collected Talks and Essays. New York: Doubleday, 1969.
- Difficult Questions, Easy Answers. London: Cassell, 1971; New York: Doubleday, 1973.
- In Broken Images: Selected Letters 1914–1946, ed. Paul O'Prey. London: Hutchinson, 1982
- Between Moon and Moon: Selected Letters 1946–1972, ed. Paul O'Prey. London: Hutchinson, 1984
- Life of the Poet Gnaeus Robertulus Gravesa, ed. Beryl & Lucia Graves. Deià: The New Seizin Press, 1990
- Collected Writings on Poetry, ed. Paul O'Prey, Manchester: Carcanet Press, 1995.
- Complete Short Stories, ed. Lucia Graves, Manchester: Carcanet Press, 1995.
- Some Speculations on Literature, History, and Religion, ed. Patrick Quinn, Manchester: Carcanet Press, 2000.

== See also ==
- English translations of Homer § Graves
- Joseph Campbell
- Mircea Eliade
- James Frazer
- Margaret Murray

== General sources ==
- Day, Douglas (1968). Swifter than Reason: The Poetry of Robert Graves. University of North Carolina Press. The first full-length assessment of the poetry and criticism of Graves.
- Graves, Richard Perceval (1986). Robert Graves: The Assault Heroic, 1895-1926, London: Weidenfeld & Nicolson. ISBN 0-297-78943-0.
- Graves, Richard Perceval (1990). Robert Graves: The Years with Laura, 1926-40, London: Weidenfeld & Nicolson. ISBN 0-297-79672-0.
- Graves, Richard Perceval (1995). Robert Graves and the White Goddess, 1940-1985, London: Weidenfeld & Nicolson. ISBN 0-297-81534-2.
- Graves, Robert (1960). Good-Bye to All That, London: Penguin.
- Graves, William (1995). Wild Olives: Life in Majorca with Robert Graves, London: Hutchinson. ISBN 0-091-79152-9.
- King, Bruce (2008). Robert Graves: A Biography, Haus Publishing. ISBN 1-905-79194-1.
- Matthews, T. S. (1979). Under the Influence: Recollections of Robert Graves, Laura Riding and Friends, London: Cassell. ISBN 0-304-30408-5.
- Moorcroft Wilson, Jean (2018). Robert Graves: From Great War Poet to Good-bye to All That (1895-1929), London: Bloomsbury. ISBN 1-472-92914-4.
- Moorcroft Wilson, Jean (2027). Robert Graves: In Pursuit of the White Goddess (1930-1985), London: Bloomsbury. ISBN 1-472-97418-2.
- O'Prey, Paul ed. (1982). In Broken Images: Selected Letters of Robert Graves, 1914-1946, London: Hutchinson. ISBN 0-091-47720-4.
- O'Prey, Paul ed. (1984). Between Moon and Moon: Selected Letters of Robert Graves, 1946-1972, London: Hutchinson. ISBN 0-091-55750-X.
- Scudamore, Pauline ed. (1991). Dear Robert, Dear Spike: The Graves-Milligan Correspondence, Sutton Publishing. ISBN 0-862-99648-1.
- Seymour, Miranda (1995). Robert Graves: Life on the Edge, London: Doubleday. ISBN 0-385-40860-9.
- Seymour-Smith, Martin (1982). Robert Graves: His Life and Work, London: Hutchinson. ISBN 0-091-39350-7.
