= King Jesus (novel) =

1946 novel by Robert Graves

- First edition (publ. Cassell)
- Author: Robert Graves
- Language: English
- Publication date: 1946

King Jesus is a 1946 novel by Robert Graves that depicts Jesus as a mortal grandson of Herod the Great and the secret heir to the kingdoms of ancient Israel and Judah and Roman Judaea. The novel is framed as a historical chronicle written at the end of the first century AD by a minor Roman official. The narrative covers Jesus’s birth, youth, his activities as a charismatic healer, and his arrest and crucifixion. The novel depicts Jesus as a secular and religious revolutionary and esoteric teacher.

== Synopsis ==
The novel's narrator is an official living in the time of Domitian (r. AD 81–96). He presents his narrative in three parts. The first part explains the dynastical roots of Jesus on both the maternal and paternal sides, establishing Jesus's temporal and divine right to the throne of Israel. The second part tells the story of Jesus's birth and youth. The third and final part chronicles the adult Jesus's work as a prophet, his execution, and the aftermath.

In a concluding "Historical Commentary" Graves writes:

"A detailed commentary written to justify the unorthodox views contained in this book would be two or three times as long as the book itself, and would take years to complete; I beg to be excused the task ...[but]...I undertake to my readers that every important element in my story is based on some tradition, however tenuous, and that I have taken more than ordinary pains to verify my historical background".

== Reception ==
A 1946 review by Kirkus Reviews opined that "This is not reading for the easily shocked; it definitely presents Jesus as a sage and a poet, if not divine. It moves, as does all Mr. Graves' writing, at a brilliant fast pace, and with a tremendous style." A contemporary review in Commentary declared that "the Jewish reviewer must protest and warn the reader of Graves’ total irresponsibility in his handling of Jewish religious tradition." John Leonard, in a 1981 assessment, noted the novel's relation to Gnosticism, adding "Mr. Graves... is still pushing his White Goddess, the mother of all religions, and when we learn that one of Herod's grandsons was helpful to Claudius at a sticky moment, we understand why Mr. Graves involved himself in his farrago in the first place."
