= The White Goddess =

1948 essay by Robert Graves

- First US edition
- Author: Robert Graves
- Language: English
- Genre: Mythology, poetry
- Publisher: Faber & Faber (UK); Creative Age Press (US)
- Publication date: 1948
- Publication place: United Kingdom

The White Goddess: a Historical Grammar of Poetic Myth is a book-length essay on the nature of poetic myth-making by the English writer Robert Graves. First published in 1948, it is based on earlier articles published in Wales magazine; corrected, revised and enlarged editions appeared in 1952 and 1961.

The White Goddess represents an approach to the study of mythology from a decidedly creative and idiosyncratic perspective. Graves proposes the existence of a European deity, the "White Goddess of Birth, Love and Death", much similar to the Mother Goddess, inspired and represented by the phases of the Moon, who lies behind the faces of the diverse goddesses of various European and pagan mythologies.

Graves argues that true or pure poetry is inextricably linked with the ancient cult-ritual of his proposed White Goddess and her son.

== History ==
Graves first wrote the book under the title of The Roebuck in the Thicket in a three-week period during January 1944, only a month after he had finished The Golden Fleece. He then left it to focus on King Jesus, a historical novel about the life of Jesus. Returning to The Roebuck in the Thicket, he renamed it The Three-Fold Muse, before finishing it and retitling it as The White Goddess. In January 1946 he sent it to the publishers, and in May 1948 it was published in the UK, and in June 1948 in the US, as The White Goddess: a Historical Grammar of Poetic Myth.

Graves believed that one could be in the true presence of the White Goddess when reading a poem. However, in his view, this could be achieved only by a true poet of the wild, and not a classical poet, or even a Romantic poet, of whom he spoke critically: "The typical poet of the 19th-century was physically degenerate, or ailing, addicted to drugs and melancholia, critically unbalanced and a true poet only in his fatalistic regard for the Goddess as the mistress who commanded his destiny".

== Poetry and myth ==
Graves described The White Goddess as "a historical grammar of the language of poetic myth". It draws from the mythology and poetry of Wales and Ireland especially, as well as that of most of Western Europe and the ancient Middle East. Relying on arguments from etymology and the use of forensic techniques to uncover what he calls 'iconotropic' redaction of original myths, Graves argues for the worship of a single goddess under many names, an idea that came to be known as "Matriarchal religion" in feminist theology of the 1970s.

The Golden Bough (1922, but first edition published 1890), an early anthropological study by Sir James George Frazer, is the starting point for much of Graves's argument, and Graves thought in part that his book made explicit what Frazer only hinted at. Graves wrote:

Sir James Frazer was able to keep his beautiful rooms at Trinity College, Cambridge until his death by carefully and methodically sailing all around his dangerous subject, as if charting the coastline of a forbidden island without actually committing himself to a declaration that it existed. What he was saying-not-saying was that Christian legend, dogma and ritual are the refinement of a great body of primitive and even barbarous beliefs, and that almost the only original element in Christianity is the personality of Jesus.

Graves's The White Goddess deals with goddess worship as the prototypical religion, analysing it largely from literary evidence, in myth and poetry.

Graves admitted he was not a medieval historian, but a poet, and thus based his work on the premise that the

language of poetic myth anciently current in the Mediterranean and Northern Europe was a magical language bound up with popular religious ceremonies in honour of the Moon-goddess, or Muse, some of them dating from the Old Stone Age, and that this remains the language of true poetry...

Graves concluded, in the second and expanded edition, that the male-dominant monotheistic god of Judaism and its successors were the cause of the White Goddess's downfall, and thus the source of much of the modern world's woe. He describes Woman as occupying a higher echelon than mere poet, that of the Muse Herself. He adds: "This is not to say that a woman should refrain from writing poems; only, that she should write as a woman, not as an honorary man." He seems particularly bothered by the spectre of women's writing reflecting male-dominated poetic conventions.

Graves derived some of his ideas from poetic inspiration and a process of "analeptic thought", which is a term he used for throwing one's mind back in time and receiving impressions.

Visual iconography was also important to Graves's conception. Graves created a methodology for reading images he called "iconotropy". To practice this methodology one is required to reduce "speech into its original images and rhythms" and then to combine these "on several simultaneous levels of thought". By applying this methodology Graves decoded a woodcut of The Judgement of Paris as depicting a singular Triple Goddess rather than the traditional Hera, Athena and Aphrodite of the narrative the image illustrates.

== Celtic tree calendar ==
Graves argues that the names of the Ogham letters in the alphabet used in parts of Gaelic Ireland and Britain contained a calendar that contained the key to an ancient liturgy involving the human sacrifice of a sacred king, and, further, that these letter names concealed lines of Ancient Greek hexameter describing the goddess.

Graves' "tree calendar" has no relation to any historical Celtic calendar. His interpretations rather rely on the book Ogygia by the 17th-century bard Roderick O'Flaherty.

== Druantia ==
In The White Goddess, Graves proposed a hypothetical Gallic tree goddess, Druantia, who has become somewhat popular with contemporary Neopagans. Druantia is an archetype of the eternal mother as seen in the evergreen boughs. Her name is believed to be derived from the Celtic word for oak trees, *drus or *deru. She is known as "Queen of the Druids". She is a goddess of fertility for plants and humans, ruling over sexual activities and passion. She also rules protection of trees, knowledge, and creativity.

== Scholarship and critical reception ==
The White Goddess has been seen as a poetic work where Graves gives his notion of man's subjection to women in love an "anthropological grandeur" and further mythologises all women in general (and several of Graves's lovers in particular) into a three-faced moon goddess model.

Graves's value as a poet aside, flaws in his scholarship such as poor philology, use of inadequate texts and outdated archaeology have been criticised. Some scholars, particularly archaeologists, historians and folklorists have rejected the work – which T. S. Eliot called "A prodigious, monstrous, stupefying, indescribable book" – and Graves himself was disappointed that his work was "loudly ignored" by many Celtic scholars.

The White Goddess was accepted as history by many non-scholarly readers. According to Ronald Hutton, it remains a major source of confusion about the ancient Celts and influences many un-scholarly views of Celtic paganism. Hilda Ellis Davidson criticised Graves as having "misled many innocent readers with his eloquent but deceptive statements about a nebulous goddess in early Celtic literature", and stated that he was "no authority" on the subject matter he presented. While Graves made the association between Goddesses and the moon appear "natural", it was not so to the Celts or some other ancient peoples. In response to critics, Graves accused literary scholars of being psychologically incapable of interpreting myth or too concerned with maintaining their perquisites to go against the majority view.

Some Neopagans have been bemused and upset by the scholarly criticism that The White Goddess has received in recent years, while others have appreciated its poetic insight but never accepted it as a work of historical veracity. Likewise, a few scholars find some value in Graves's ideas; Michael W. Pharand, though quoting earlier criticisms, stated: "Graves's theories and conclusions, outlandish as they seemed to his contemporaries (or may appear to us), were the result of careful observation." The historian Norman Davies references Graves ideas from The White Goddess favorably in his book Europe: A History.

According to Graves's biographer Richard Perceval Graves, Laura Riding played a crucial role in the development of Graves's thoughts when writing The White Goddess, despite the fact the two were estranged at that point. On reviewing the book, Riding was furious: "Where once I reigned, now a whorish abomination has sprung to life, a Frankenstein pieced together from the shards of my life and thoughts."

== Literary influences ==
The book was a major influence on the thinking of the poets Ted Hughes and Sylvia Plath, with the latter identifying to some extent with the goddess figure herself. Jacqueline Rose argued that what she called "the cliché behind the myth – woman as inspiration, woman as drudge" ultimately had a negative impact on Plath's life and work.

Alan Garner has cited the book as an influence on his fiction, especially The Owl Service. In an interview, Garner has referred to the book as "that most infuriating gold mine of imagery, The White Goddess, which I understood with great clarity on the fifth reading." Susan Cooper has also cited The White Goddess as an inspiration for her The Dark Is Rising sequence of fantasy novels. Lloyd Alexander took the names of some of the characters in his fantasy novels The Chronicles of Prydain from Graves' The White Goddess.

The White Goddess also influenced American science fiction writers. The novels Sign of the Labrys by Margaret St. Clair, Flesh by Philip José Farmer, and The Snow Queen by Joan D. Vinge, were all inspired by the concepts in The White Goddess.

== See also ==
- The Alphabet Versus the Goddess: The Conflict Between Word and Image
- The Hebrew Goddess
- Matriarchal religion
- Triple Goddess (Neopaganism)
- Triple goddesses
- When God Was a Woman
- The White Goddess (poem)

== Bibliography ==
=== Editions ===
- 1948 – The White Goddess : a Historical Grammar of Poetic Myth (London: Faber & Faber) [Corr. 2nd ed. also issued by Faber in 1948] [US ed.= New York, Creative Age Press, 1948]
- 1952 – The White Goddess : a Historical Grammar of Poetic Myth, Amended & enl. ed.[i.e. 3rd ed.] (London: Faber & Faber) [US ed.= New York: Alfred A.Knopf, 1958]
- 1961 – The White Goddess : a Historical Grammar of Poetic Myth, Amended & enl. ed.[i.e. 4th ed.] (London: Faber & Faber) [US ed.= New York, Farrar, Straus and Giroux, 1966]
- 1997 – The White Goddess : a Historical Grammar of Poetic Myth; edited by Grevel Lindop (Manchester: Carcanet) ISBN 1-85754-248-7

=== Critical studies ===
- Bennett, Joseph, [review of Robert Graves' The White Goddess: a Historical Grammar of Poetic Myth], Hudson Review, vol.2 (1949), 133–138
- Davis, Robert A., 'The Origin, Evolution, and Function of the Myth of the White Goddess in the Writings of Robert Graves' (unpublished PhD, University of Stirling, 1987) [ British Library copy: BLDSC DX212513]
- Donoghue, Denis, 'The Myths of Robert Graves', New York Review of Books, 43, no.6 (4 April 1996), 27–31
- Graves and the Goddess : Essays on Robert Graves's The White Goddess, ed. by Ian Firla and Grevel Lindop (Selinsgrove, Pa.: Susquehanna University Press, 2003) ISBN 1-57591-055-1
- Graves, Richard Perceval, Robert Graves and The White Goddess, 1940–85 (London: Weidenfeld and Nicolson, 1995) ISBN 0-297-81534-2
- Kirkham, M.C., 'Incertitude and The White Goddess', Essays in Criticism, 16 (1966), 57–72
- Lindop, Grevel, 'A Crazy Book: Robert Graves and The White Goddess', PN Review, 24, no. 1 [117] (1997 Sept–Oct), 27–29
- Musgrove, Sydney, The Ancestry of 'The White Goddess, (Bulletin No. 62, English Series, no. 11) (Auckland: Univ. of Auckland Press, 1962)
- Smeds, John. Statement and story : Robert Graves's myth-making (Åbo : Åbo Akademis Förlag, 1997)
- Vickery, John B., Robert Graves and The White Goddess (Lincoln: Univ. of Nebraska Press, 1972)
- Vogel, Amber, 'Not Elizabeth to his Raleigh: Laura Riding, Robert Graves, and origins of The White Goddess', in Literary Couplings: Writing Couples, Collaborators, and the Construction of Authorship, ed. by Marjorie Stone and Judith Thompson (University of Wisconsin Press, 2006), pp. 229–239, ISBN 978-0-299-21760-0
