= Paul O'Prey =

Academic leader and author

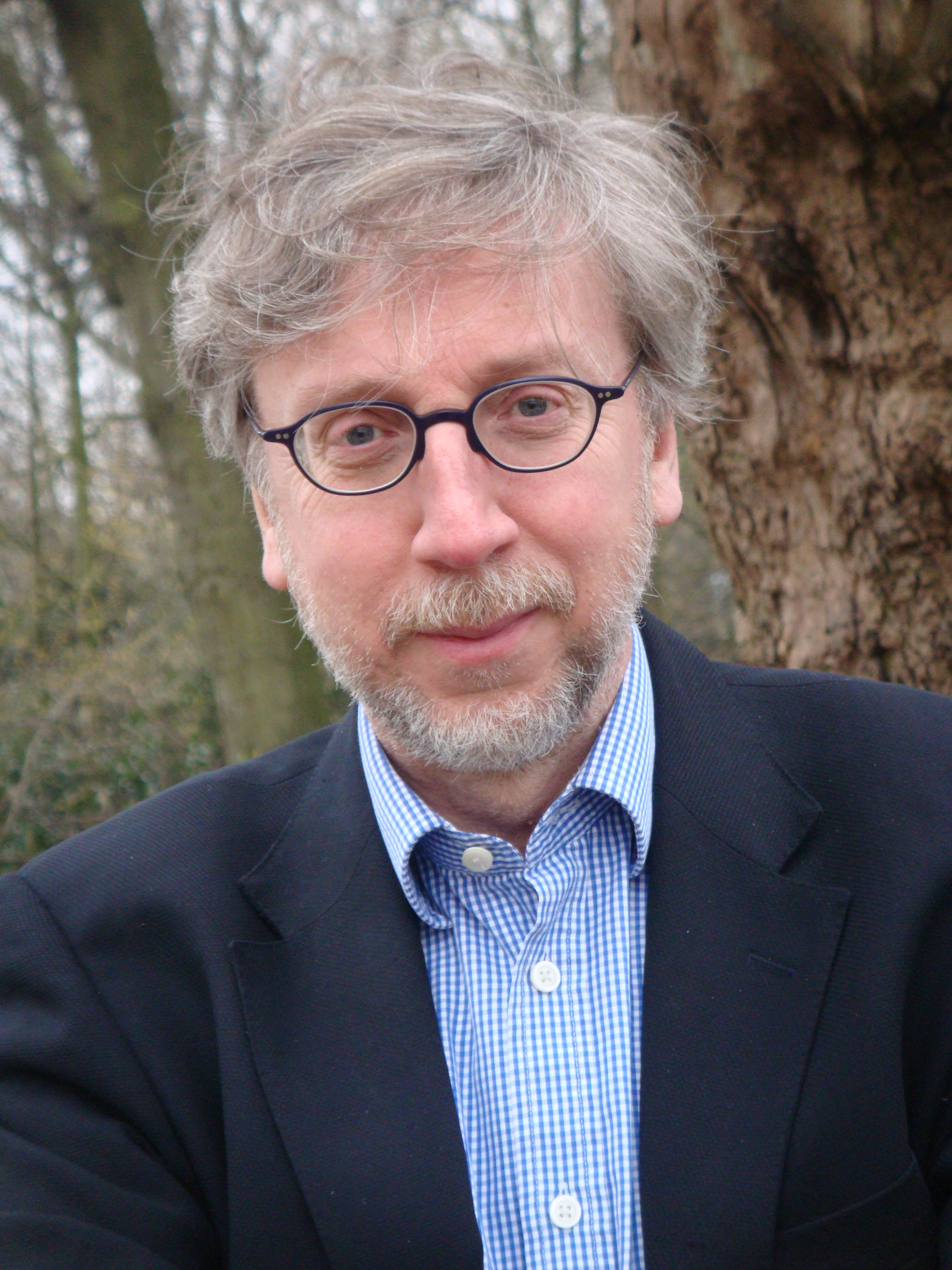

Paul Gerard O'Prey CBE is an academic and author who was Vice-Chancellor and President of the University of Roehampton, London from 2004 until 2019. In 2019 he was appointed chair of the Edward James Foundation, which owns a large rural estate in the South Downs and runs West Dean College of Arts and Conservation. After working in various senior roles at the University of Bristol, in 2004 O'Prey was appointed Vice-Chancellor of the University of Roehampton in south-west London, where he was also Professor of Modern Literature.

== Life and career ==
O'Prey was born in Southampton, the youngest of five children. He attended St George Catholic College until the age of 16, when he transferred to King Edward VI School, Southampton, then a grant-maintained grammar school. He won a place to study English language and literature at Keble College, Oxford. He obtained his PhD from the University of Bristol, where his supervisor was Charles Tomlinson.

In 1977, O'Prey left Oxford University to work for the author Robert Graves at his home in Deià, Mallorca. O'Prey assisted him in various ways, most notably working with Graves's wife, Beryl (died 2003), on the creation of a major archive of Graves's papers which is now housed at St John's College, Oxford.

That work led him to publish a biographical study of Graves told through his letters with other writers such as Siegfried Sassoon, T.S. Eliot and Gertrude Stein, published in two volumes: In Broken Images (Hutchinson, 1982) and Between Moon and Moon (Hutchinson, 1984). O'Prey's edition of Graves's Selected Poems (Penguin Books, 1986), published just after Graves's death in 1985, reinstated a number of poems which Graves himself had previously suppressed, including some of his youthful war poetry written during World War I.

O'Prey's other books include Fleet, a collection of poems tracing the course of the lost River Fleet that flows beneath the streets of North London, published by The Melos Press in 2021.

O'Prey also writes about poetry and conflict. Counter-Wave: Poetry of Rescue in the First World War is the first anthology of poetry by volunteer workers who went to the war to save life rather than to take it. First World War: Poems from the Front, was published in 2014 by the Imperial War Museum, to coincide with the centenary of the war. It takes a new approach in focusing on a small number of poets who saw active service on the Western Front, including three women.

O'Prey translated with Lucia Graves the first English translation of the Spanish nineteenth century classic novel, The House of Ulloa by Emilia Pardo Bazan (Penguin Classics, 1991, reissued 2013). The book was later serialised by Channel 4.

O'Prey wrote the first full critical study of the novels of Graham Greene, and edited the Penguin edition of Heart of Darkness by Joseph Conrad (Penguin Books, 1983). He edited the first collection of poems by the American First World War nurse and novelist Mary Borden (Dare-Gale Press, 2015). His media appearances include BBC Two's War of Words: Soldier Poets of the Somme, broadcast in 2014 and a Channel 4 programme on drugs and art.

== Affiliations ==
O'Prey has served on a number of bodies, including University of Sussex Council (2021–present); Universities UK Board and chair of the Longer Term strategy Group (2010–2019); the Edward James Foundation and West Dean College trustee (2015–present), Froebel Trust trustee (2013–19), Higher Education Funding Council for England Strategic Advisory Committee on Leadership Governance and Management (2005–11); Higher Education Careers Services Unit Board (2006–13); London Higher Board (2006–09); Sport England Higher Education Stakeholder Group (2008–present); Putney High School, governor (2004–09); editorial board of Despatches, journal of the Imperial War Museum; the War Poets Association (Board member 2007–present; President 2007–13); and Worldwide Universities Network Academic Board (2002–04).

== Career ==
Prior to joining the University of Roehampton as vice-chancellor and chief executive when it gained independent university status in 2004, O'Prey spent 16 years at the University of Bristol, where he worked in a variety of capacities, latterly as Director of Academic Affairs.

== Awards ==
In 2011, O'Prey received honorary doctorates from the University of Bristol and Manhattanville College (New York).

== Honours ==
O'Prey was appointed Commander of the Order of the British Empire in the 2016 Birthday Honours for services to higher education and the literary history of the First World War.
