= Martin Seymour-Smith =

British poet and literary critic

Martin Roger Seymour-Smith (24 April 1928 – 1 July 1998) was a British poet, literary critic, and biographer.

== Biography ==
Seymour-Smith was born in London and educated at Highgate School and St Edmund Hall, Oxford, where he was editor of Isis and Oxford Poetry. His father Frank was a chief librarian who supplied books to Robert Graves, and who published the survey An English Library, an Annotated List of 1300 Classics in 1943, followed by What Shall I Read Next: a Personal Selection of Twentieth Century English Books in 1953. His mother Marjorie wrote poetry and published under the name of Elena Fearn.

He began as one of the most promising Anglophone post-war poets, but became better known as a critic, writing biographies of Robert Graves (whom he met first at age 14 and maintained close ties with), Rudyard Kipling and Thomas Hardy, and producing numerous critical studies. The poet and critic Robert Nye stated that Seymour-Smith was "one of the finest British poets after 1945." Others to praise his poetry included Robert Graves, C. H. Sisson, Geoffrey Grigson and James Reeves.

Seymour-Smith came to prominence in 1963, as the editor of the first twentieth-century edition of Shakespeare's Sonnets to use the 'original' spelling. Characteristically, his commentary concerned Shakespeare's sexuality, which upset many. Later, his Fallen Women (1969) and Sex and Society (1975) would become 'standard plundering material for more famous works' as the author good-humouredly claimed. He had known Alex Comfort, who was then writing The Joy of Sex (1972), from their schooldays at Highgate School and the two often swapped notes.

Seymour-Smith's Poets Through their Letters Vol 1 (Wyatt to Coleridge) was acclaimed for its scholarship, but sold poorly. Hence, Volume 2 was never published.

His two volumes of poetry Tea with Miss Stockport (1963) and Reminiscences of Norma (1971), were praised by many, including Peter Porter. But an apparent creative silence till his last collection, Wilderness (1994), led to a decline in his reputation with the reading public during the 1980s.

The Guide to Modern World Literature is an encyclopaedic attempt to describe all major 20th-century authors, in all languages. The book is over 1450 pages long. Cyril Connolly said of the first (1973) edition: "I'm very much afraid he will prove indispensable!" His criticism of Lawrence Durrell singled out his poetry as his real achievement; John Fowles, Muriel Spark, C. P. Snow, Malcolm Bradbury and Ted Hughes received the first adverse criticism of their reputations in this book. The stature of Anthony Powell's A Dance to the Music of Time (1951–1976) as the greatest fictional post-war achievement was asserted: a view endorsed by Kingsley Amis and Hilary Spurling. He also predicted that T. S. Eliot's Four Quartets would not survive as a great poem by 2000.

The polyglot Seymour-Smith further used the book to champion writers he regarded as under-rated, such as James Hanley, Laura Riding, Wyndham Lewis, Roberto Arlt, Pio Baroja, Rayner Heppenstall and Jose Maria Arguedas, while attacking those he felt were overvalued, such as George Bernard Shaw, W. H. Auden and as mentioned above, T. S. Eliot. Seymour-Smith also disparaged Harold Pinter, Margaret Atwood, and Tom Stoppard, whom he thought over-rated.

In 1981 The New Astrologer was published, Seymour-Smith's only book on this subject.

Anthony Burgess likened Seymour-Smith to Samuel Johnson due to his many literary surveys from The Guide to Modern World Literature in 1975 onwards.

When the 2013 new edition of the Oxford Companion of Modern Poetry was published, he was notably not included.

== Private life ==
He married Janet de Granville in 1952 while spending a working holiday in Mallorca where he was a tutor to Graves' son and Graves employed de Granville as a translator. Graves was a witness at the wedding. When he was asked how he managed to read so much he admitted that he hadn't. Janet had. They were rarely apart and she died two months after he did.

== Selected publications ==
- The Guide to Modern World Literature, Hodder & Stoughton, London (1975)
- Who's Who in 20th Century Literature, Mcgraw-Hill, Columbus, OH. (1977) ISBN 0-07-056350-0
- Novels and Novelists: A Guide to the World of Fiction, St. Martins Press, London (1980) ISBN 0-312-57966-7
- A Reader's Guide to Fifty European Novels, Rl Innactive Titles (1980) ISBN 0-389-20138-3
- Robert Graves: His Life and Work, Bloomsbury Publishing PLC., London (1982) ISBN 0-7475-2205-7
- The New Astrologer, Macmillan Pub Co., London (1983) ISBN 978-0-02-081940-0
- The New Guide to Modern Literature, Peter Bedrick Books, New York (1985) ISBN 0-87226-000-3
- The 100 Most Influential Books Ever Written, MJF Books – Fine Communications, New York (1998) ISBN 1-56731-678-6
- Collected Poems 1943–1993, Greenwich Exchange (2006)
- The Poems of Martin Seymour-Smith, Rún Press (2014)
