= Geoffrey Phibbs =

Irish poet (1900–1956)

Jeoffrey "Geoffrey" Basil Phibbs (1900–1956) was an English-born Irish poet; he took his mother's name and called himself Geoffrey Taylor, after about 1930.

Phibbs was born in Smallburgh, Norfolk. He was brought up in Sligo, and educated in England at Haileybury.

In 1924 he married the artist Norah McGuinness, whom he divorced in 1930. Their marriage break-up was initially brought about by his involvement with the poet Laura Riding,

The poetry collection The Withering of the Fig Leaf (1927) was to be published by the Hogarth Press. At the last moment Phibbs became concerned about perceived anti-Catholic sentiment in it, and asked Leonard Woolf to withdraw it. Another collection, It Was Not Jones, was issued by Hogarth in 1928, but under the pseudonym R. Fitzurse.

In 1928, Robert Graves who was then Laura Riding’s partner visited Phibbs in Sligo. The following year, Phibbs came to London, where his arrival disrupted the household shared by Graves, his wife Nancy Nicholson, and Riding.

After some bitter wrangling, Graves and Riding lived together in Spain, and Phibbs set up house with Nicholson in Wiltshire. Phibbs and Norah McGuinness were divorced shortly afterwards. The relationship with Nancy Nicholson gradually came to an end, and it was she who introduced him to Mary Dillwyn, though she was upset when he began a relationship with Mary.

In 1935 Phibbs married Mary Dillwyn, and in 1940 they returned to Ireland. He was subsequently known mostly for anthologies, and non-fiction writing. As literary editor of The Bell, he gave significant space to poetry from Northern Ireland, and allowed Roy McFadden a critical voice. His selection, Irish Poems of Today: Chosen from the First Seven Volumes of "The Bell", appeared in 1944. In the same period he met and struck up a strong friendship with John Betjeman; they worked on several poetry collections.

Phibbs died in Dublin of a heart attack. Some of his literary papers survive in the Library of Trinity College, the University of Dublin.
