= Richard Perceval Graves =

English biographer, poet and lecturer

Richard Perceval Graves (born 21 December 1945) is an English biographer, poet and lecturer, best known for his three-volume biography of his uncle Robert Graves.

== Biography ==
Richard Graves was born in Brighton, England, the son of John Tiarks Ranke Graves, a younger son of Alfred Perceval Graves. He was educated at Tollard Royal, Dorset, The White House, Wokingham and at Holme Grange School, Wokingham. He went on to Copthorne School (1954–1959), Charterhouse (1959–1964) and St John's College, Oxford (1964–1968). At Oxford, Graves read Modern History and then completed a Diploma in Education. He then taught at several schools until 1973, the year in which he became a full-time writer.

Graves is the author of some nineteen books, including biographies of T. E. Lawrence, A. E. Housman, the Powys brothers (John Cowper Powys, Theodore Francis Powys and Llewelyn Powys) and Richard Hughes. He has written a number of other books on a variety of subjects, and collaborated on several other publishing projects. Graves continues to write, and lectures on the subjects and people about whom he has written. He is married with three children and lives in Shrewsbury, Shropshire.

Graves taught English at Ellesmere College from 1971 to 1973.

== Works ==
- Graves, Richard Perceval (1976). Lawrence of Arabia and his World. Thames & Hudson, London. ISBN 9780684147260.
- Graves, Richard Perceval (1979). A.E.Housman: The Scholar-Poet. Routledge & Kegan Paul, London.
- Graves, Richard Perceval (1983). The Brothers Powys. Routledge & Kegan Paul, London.
- Graves, Richard Perceval (1986). Robert Graves: The Assault Heroic (1895–1940). Weidenfeld & Nicolson, London.
- Graves, Richard Perceval (1990). Robert Graves: the Years with Laura (1926–1940). Weidenfeld & Nicolson, London.
- Graves, Richard Perceval (1994). Richard Hughes. Andre Deutsch, London.
- Graves, Richard Perceval (1995). Robert Graves and the White Goddess (1940–1985). Weidenfeld & Nicolson, London.
- Graves, Robert (1995). Graves, Richard Perceval (ed.). Good-Bye to All That. Berghahn, Oxford.
