= Earl of Downe =

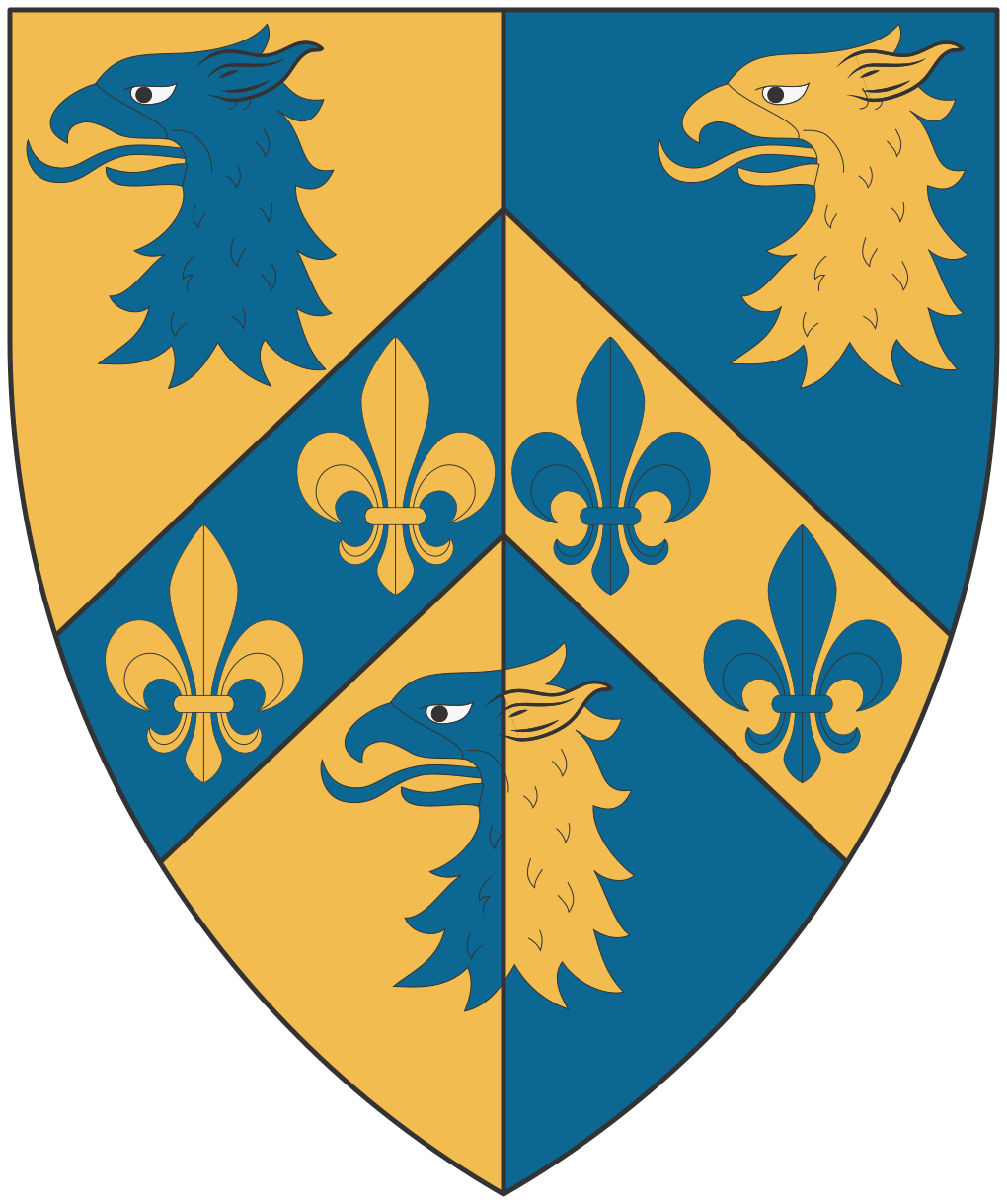
The coat of arms of the Popes of Wilcote, later Earls of Downe.

Earl of Downe was a title in the Peerage of Ireland. It was created on 16 October 1628 for Sir William Pope, 1st Baronet. He had already been created a Baronet, of Wilcote in the County of Oxford, in the Baronetage of England on 29 June 1611 and was made Baron Pope at the same time as he was granted the earldom, also in the Peerage of Ireland. He was succeeded by his grandson, the second Earl. He was the son of Sir William Pope. Lord Downe had no sons and was succeeded by his uncle, the third Earl. The titles became extinct on the death of the fourth Earl on 18 May 1668.

== Earls of Downe (1628) ==
- William Pope, 1st Earl of Downe (died 1631), builder of Wroxton Manor, Oxfordshire.
  - (Sir William Pope, his son, predeceased the 1st Earl)
- Thomas Pope, 2nd Earl of Downe (1622–1660), grandson of the 1st Earl
- Thomas Pope, 3rd Earl of Downe (1598–1668), younger son of the 1st Earl
- Thomas Pope, 4th Earl of Downe (1640–1668)

== Sources ==
- Leigh Rayment's Peerage Pages
