= William Pope, 1st Earl of Downe =

English peer

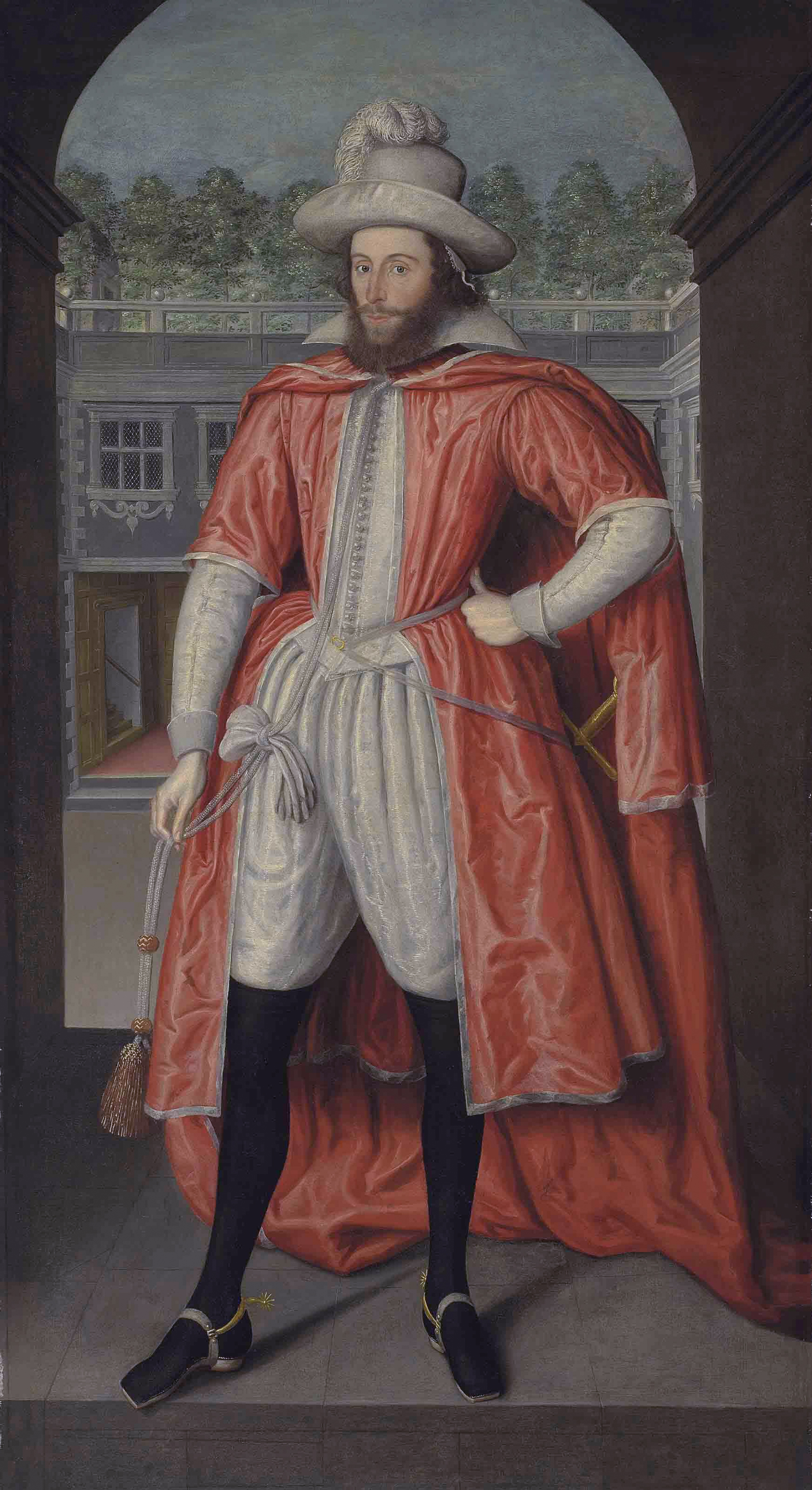
William Pope, 1st Earl of Downe, by Robert Peake

William Pope, 1st Earl of Downe (1573 – 2 June 1631), known as Sir William Pope, 1st Baronet from 1611 to 1628, was an English peer.

Pope was the son of John Pope and Elizabeth Brocket, daughter of Sir John Brocket. He was a nephew of Sir Thomas Pope and he inherited his extensive estates in Oxfordshire. In 1601 he was appointed High Sheriff of Oxfordshire, and he was made a Knight of the Bath at the coronation of James VI and I as King of England in 1603. On 29 June 1611 he was created a baronet, of Wilcote in the Baronetage of England. In 1618, Pope completed the reconstruction of the family seat at Wroxton Abbey in the Jacobean style at a cost of £6,000. The house was subsequently visited by King James I as a guest of Pope.

In 1628, Pope purchased an earldom in the Irish Peerage for £2,500, and he was created Earl of Downe and Baron Pope of Belturbet on 16 October that year.

He married Anne Hopton, daughter of Sir Owen Hopton and widow of Henry Wentworth, 3rd Baron Wentworth, in 1595. She was painted by Marcus Gheeraerts the Younger in 1595, visibly pregnant and with her three children by her first husband. Upon Pope's death in 1631, he was succeeded in his title by his grandson, Thomas Pope; Pope's eldest son, the politician Sir William Pope, having predeceased him. He was buried in Wroxton church, where he shares an elaborate memorial with his wife.

Peerage of Ireland
New creation	Earl of Downe; 1628–1631	Succeeded by Thomas Pope
New creation	Baron Pope; 1628–1631	Succeeded by Thomas Pope
Baronetage of England
New creation	Baronet (of Wilcote); 1611–1631	Succeeded by Thomas Pope
