= Thomas Pope, 2nd Earl of Downe =

English nobleman and Royalist

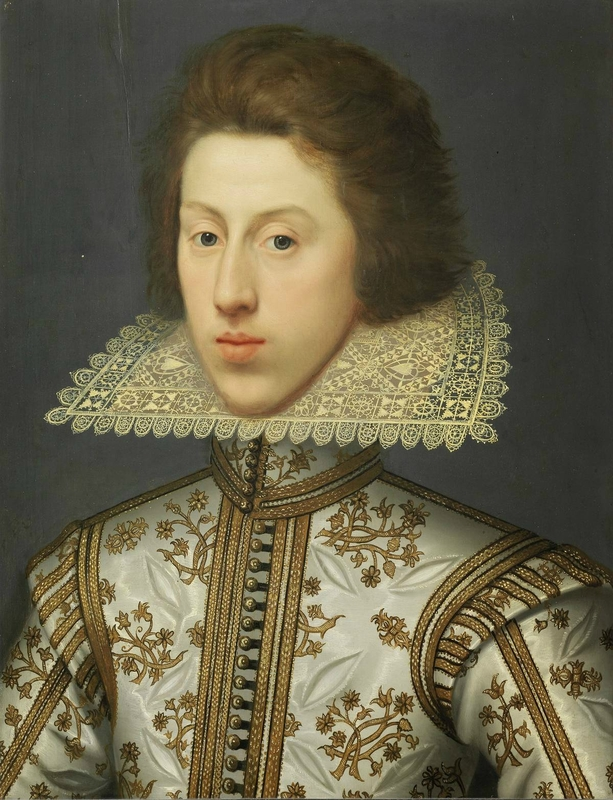
Downe by William Larkin

Thomas Pope, 2nd Earl of Downe (1622–1660) was an English nobleman and Royalist.

== Life ==
Baptised at Cogges, near Witney, 16 December 1622, the eldest of the three sons of Sir William Pope, Knt. (1596–1624), by Elizabeth, sole heiress of Sir Thomas Watson, knt., of Halstead, Kent. His mother married, after his father's death, Sir Thomas Penyston, 1st Baronet, of Cornwall, Oxfordshire. His grandfather Sir William Pope of Wroxton Abbey, near Banbury, was created Earl of Downe in the kingdom of Ireland, and died on 2 July 1631. Thomas, his grandson succeeded to his title, and to the large estates in north-west Oxfordshire which had been settled on the family in 1555 by Sir Thomas Pope.

The young Earl was brought up at the house of his guardian, John Dutton of Sherborne. On 26 November 1638 he married his guardian's daughter Lucy, then aged twelve, and on 21 June 1639 matriculated as a nobleman at Christ Church, Oxford; but he offended against academic discipline, fighting with the son of John Prideaux, and before 13 March 1641 he left the university.

In February 1641, still aged only eighteen, he petitioned Parliament for redress for his guardian's and stepfather's alleged pillaging of his estate. Downe claimed that meadows and pastureland had been ploughed up, timber felled, and rents embezzled, and furthermore that he had been forced to marry Lucy Dutton against both their wills by threats, abuse, and violence. In March that year the Court of Wards and Liveries granted him leave to fell £2000 worth of timber at his property at North Leigh and Cogges for his maintenance during his minority. The following year, 1642, he sought to gain a divorce by Act of Parliament. This was unsuccessful despite his being represented by Sir Kenelm Digby.

When the First English Civil War broke out, Downe raised a troop of horse, and was in Oxford with the king in 1643. Charles I slept at his wife's house at Cubberley, Gloucestershire, on 6 September 1643 and 12 July 1644. In 1645, his estate being valued at £2,202 per annum, he was fined £5,000 by the committee for compounding. He took the oath and covenant before 24 October 1645, but had difficulty in raising money for his fine, and in 1648 his other debts amounted to £11,000. The sequestration was finally discharged on 18 April 1651, after he had sold, under powers obtained by a private act in 1650, all his lands, except the manors of Cogges and Wilcote, Cubberley, which he held in right of his wife, and Enstone, with the adjacent townships.

== Death ==
Downe left England, and travelled in France and Italy. He died at the royalist coffeehouse of Arthur Tilliard in Oxford, 28 December 1660. His body was buried among his ancestors at Wroxton 11 January 1661, with an inscribed floor-slab in the chancel.

== Family ==
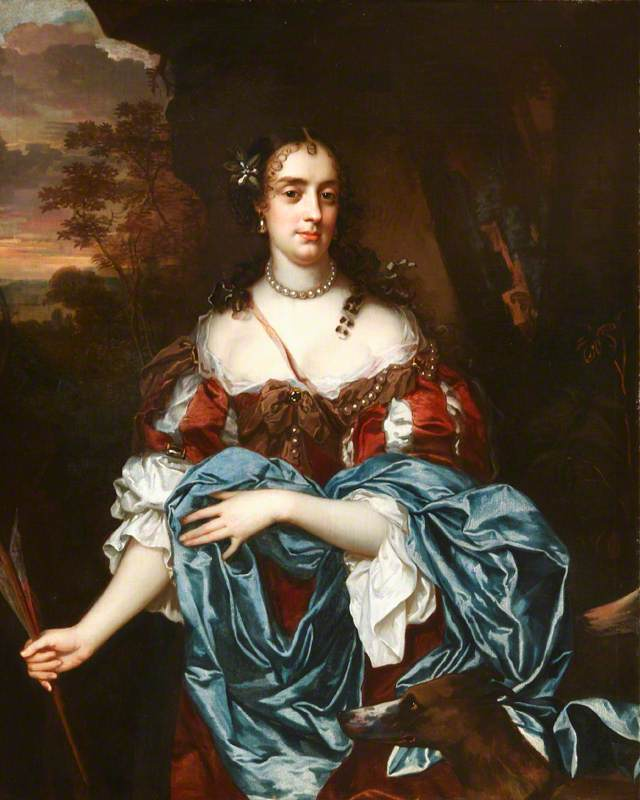
Lady Elizabeth Pope (1660–1719), Lady Lee, later Countess of Lindsey, as Diana

Lucy, Countess of Downe died 6 April 1656, and was buried at Cubberley. Just before Downe's death his only child, Elizabeth (born at Cogges 15 April 1645), married Sir Francis Lee, 4th Baronet. Her second husband was Robert Bertie, 3rd Earl of Lindsey; and the Enstone property descended through her to the Viscounts Dillon. The peerage passed to Pope's uncle, Thomas Pope, 3rd Earl of Downe.

== Notes ==
Attribution

- This article incorporates text from a publication now in the public domain: Blakiston, Herbert Edward Douglas (1896). "Pope, Thomas (1622-1660)". In Lee, Sidney (ed.). Dictionary of National Biography. Vol. 46. London: Smith, Elder & Co. p. 138.
