= North Leigh =

Village in Oxfordshire, England

Coordinates: 51.813°N 1.440°W

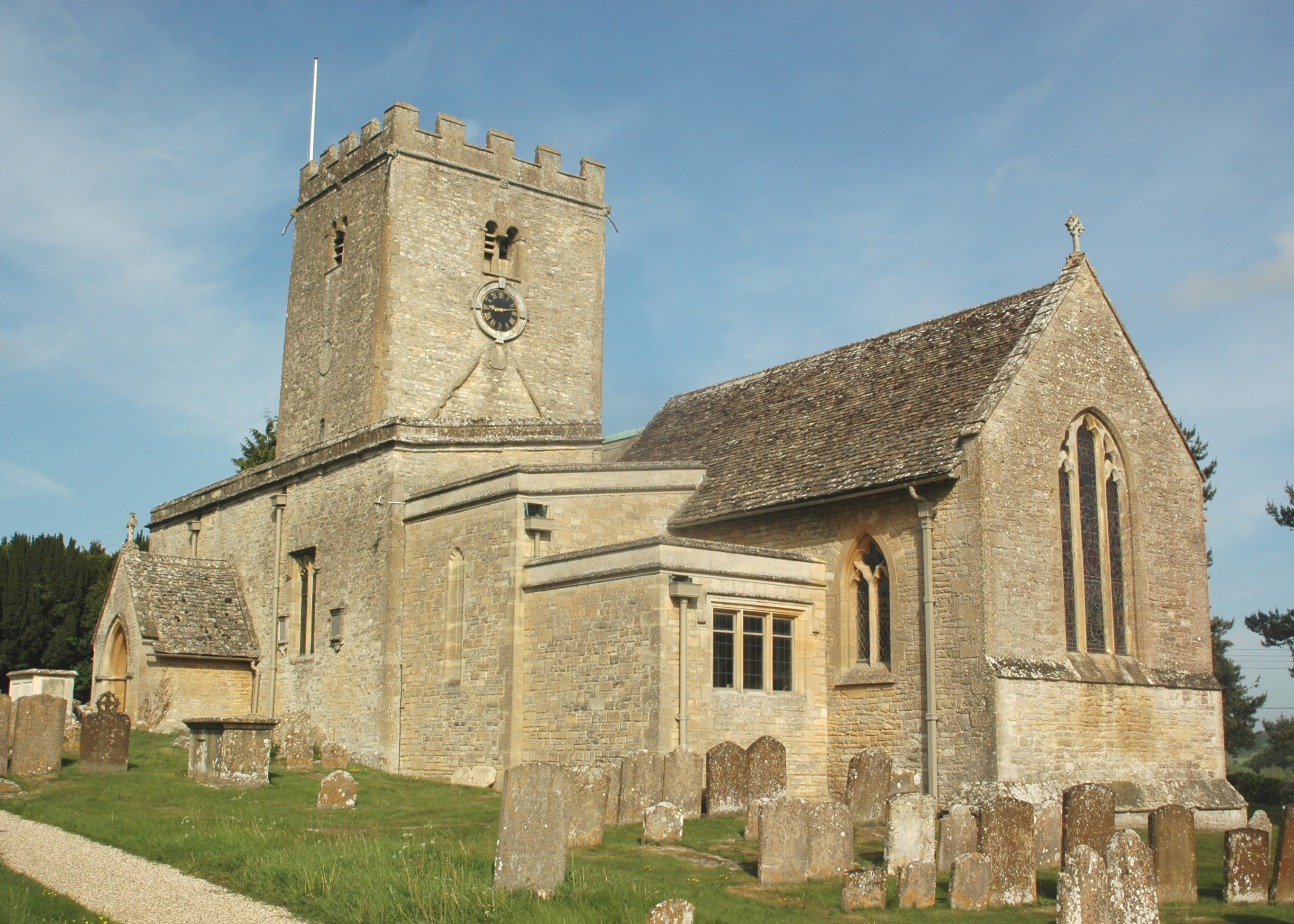
- St Mary's parish church

- Location within Oxfordshire
- Population: 1,929 (parish, including East End https://east-end.uk and Wilcote) (2011 Census)
- OS grid reference: SP3812
- Civil parish: North Leigh
- District: West Oxfordshire
- Shire county: Oxfordshire
- Region: South East
- Country: England
- Sovereign state: United Kingdom
- Post town: Witney
- Postcode district: OX29
- Dialling code: 01993
- Police: Thames Valley
- Fire: Oxfordshire
- Ambulance: South Central
- UK Parliament: Bicester and Woodstock
- Website: www.northleigh.org www.northleigh.uk

North Leigh is a village and civil parish about 3 miles (5 km) northeast of Witney in Oxfordshire. The parish includes the hamlet of East End and since 1932 has also included the hamlet of Wilcote. The 2011 Census recorded the parish's population as 1,929.

== Early history ==
Green Wood fort, about 1 mile (1.6 km) south of the village in the grounds of Estell manor, is an Iron Age hill fort.

The course of Akeman Street Roman road linking Cirencester with London forms part of the northern boundary of the parish. Two Roman villas have been excavated in the parish. One is about 1 mile (1.6 km) northwest of the centre of the village and is not on display. The other, known as North Leigh Roman Villa, is about 1/2 mile (800 m) north of East End. It is under the care of English Heritage and is open to the public.

In 1928 the remains of eight Saxon burials from the 7th century AD were found less than 1 mile (1.6 km) north of the centre of the village. The toponym Leigh is also Saxon, derived from the Old English leah meaning a clearing. "North" distinguishes the village from South Leigh, less than 3 miles (5 km) to the south.

In local dialect North Leigh is pronounced "Nor'Lye", and the parish newsletter is called the Nor'Lye News.

== Manor ==
The Domesday Book of 1086 records that the Norman nobleman Roger d'Ivry held the manor of North Leigh. D'Ivry was a brother in arms of Robert D'Oyly who built Oxford Castle. Roger d'Ivry granted two thirds of the demesne tithes of the manor to St. George's church in Oxford Castle.

Some of d'Ivry's manors, including North Leigh, became part of the Honour of St Valery. In the 12th century St. George's church and its tithes passed to the Augustinian Osney Abbey in Oxford. In 1279 the remaining third of the tithes and an area of land in the parish were made over to the Cistercian Hailes Abbey in Gloucestershire. Richard, 1st Earl of Cornwall had founded Hailes Abbey in 1245 or 1246, and also owned North Leigh manor. From 1314 Hailes Abbey also leased Osney Abbey's tithes from North Leigh.

In the 13th century the honour of St. Valery passed to the Earl of Cornwall, but when Edmund, 2nd Earl of Cornwall died childless in 1300 it then passed to the Crown.

Lieu-Dieu Abbey in the Somme area of northern France was founded in 1191, and shortly thereafter it was given the tenancy of North Leigh manor. In 1247 Lieu-Dieu sold the tenancy to the Cistercian Netley Abbey in Hampshire. In 1536 the Abbey was suppressed in the Dissolution of the Monasteries and the tenancy of North Leigh passed to the Crown. In the Dissolution of the Monasteries the land and tithes of the abbeys were taken by the Crown.

In 1544 the Crown granted the former Hailes land to three London citizens, and in 1555 one of them then granted it to the Bridewell Hospital in London. In 1544 the Crown granted the manor to Sir Thomas Pope, with whose heirs it remained until a later Thomas Pope, the 3rd Earl of Downe sold it in 1660.

From 1676 the manor belonged to the Perrott family, who had been linked with the Popes by marriage in the 16th century, and after whom Perrotts Hill Farm is named. Perrotts Hill farmhouse is 17th century or older, but was remodelled in the 18th and 19th centuries.

In 1765 James Leigh-Perrott sold the manor of North Leigh to George Spencer, 4th Duke of Marlborough. At the time the manor had 1,200 acres (490 ha) of land, but over the years the Blenheim Estate sold parts of it until 1984 it retained only about 250 acres (100 ha). North Leigh parish was farmed under the open field system until 1759, when an Act of Parliament allowed their enclosure. Bridewell Hospital received two farms, one of which is Bridewell Farm. The Bridewell farmhouse was built in 1761.

== Churches ==
=== Church of England ===
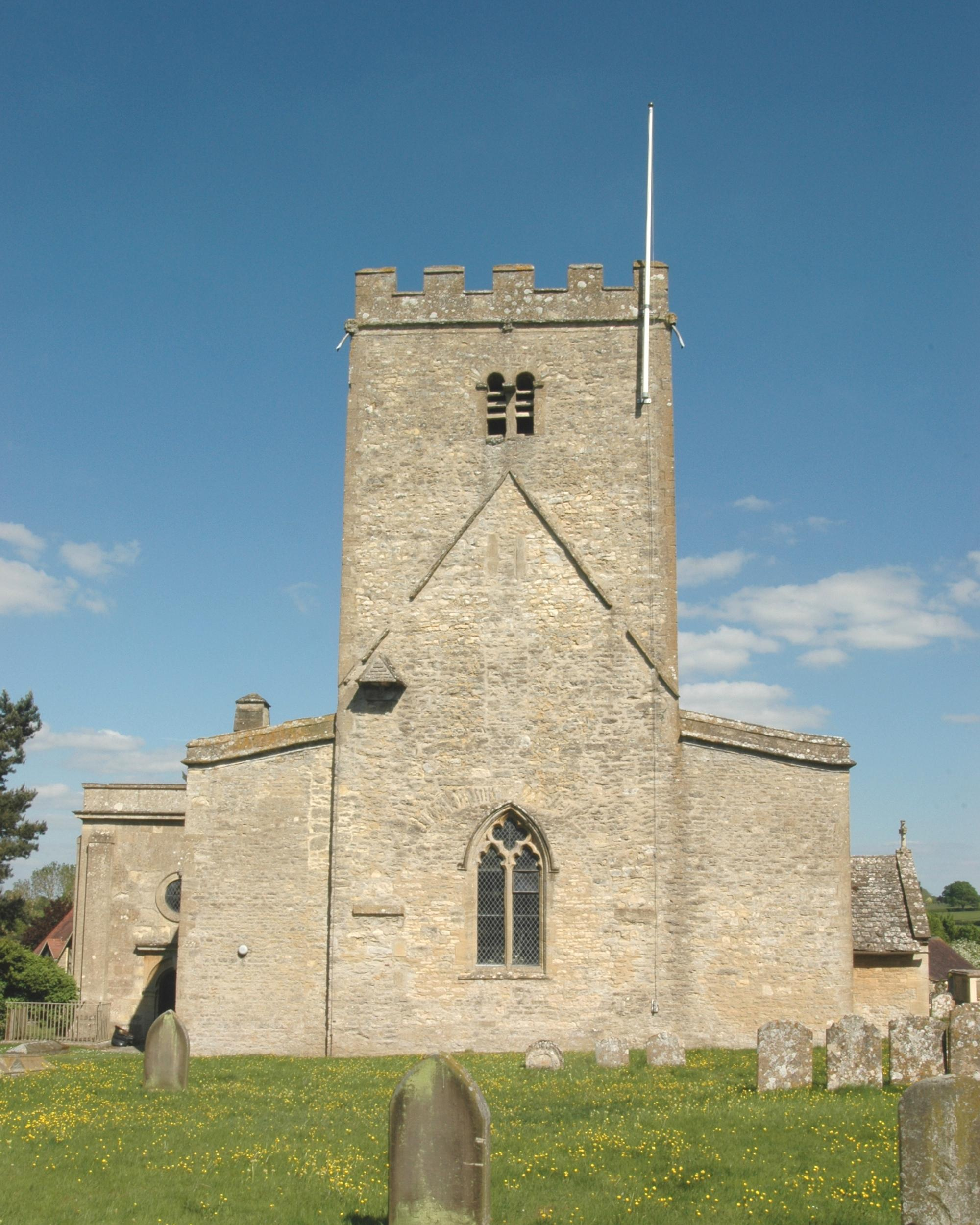
St Mary's parish church from the west

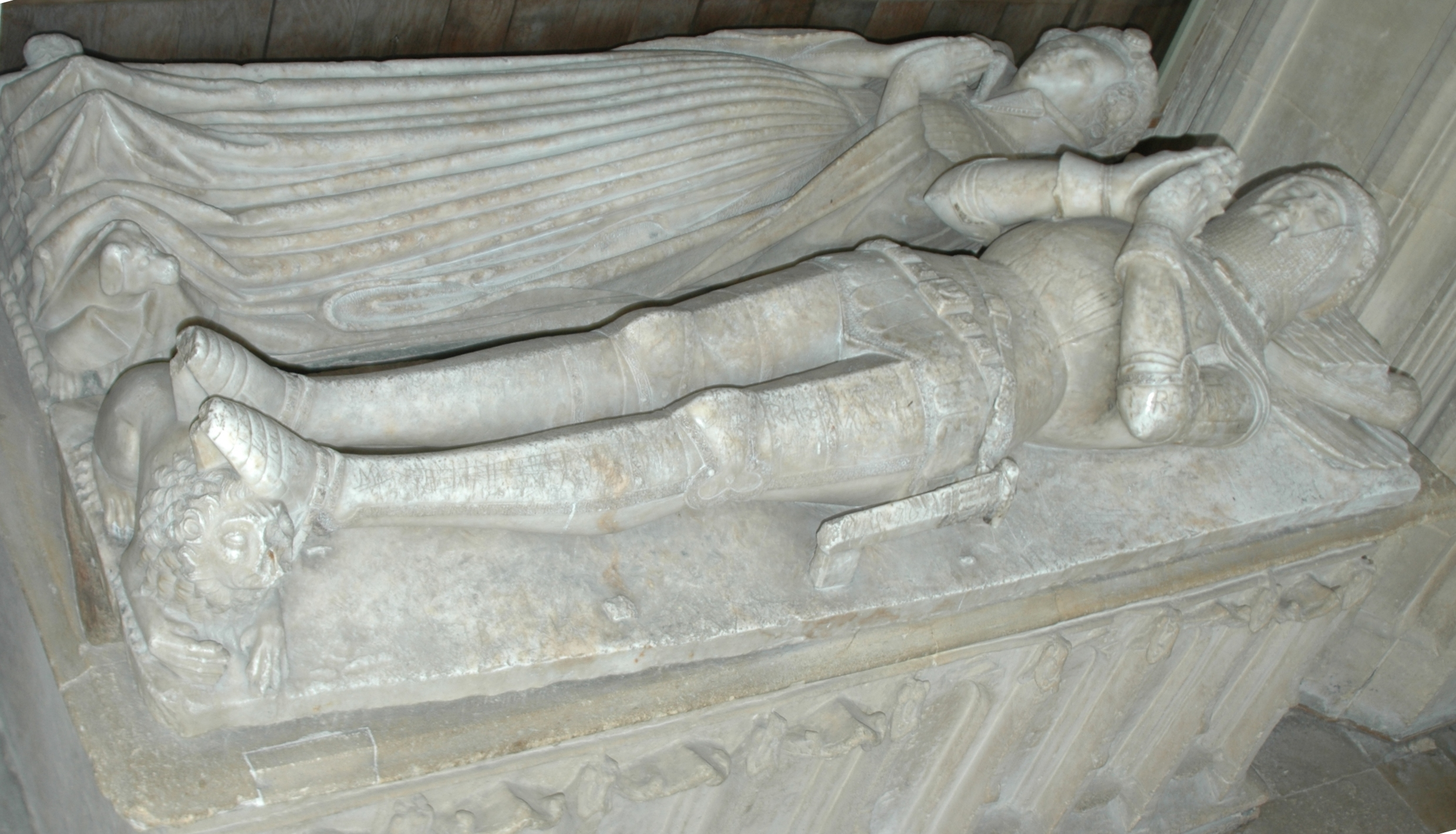
Alabaster effigies of Sir William Wilcote (died 1410) and his wife

The bell tower of the Church of England parish church of Saint Mary is late Saxon, probably built in the first half of the 11th century. The building underwent a complex series of alterations from the 12th to the 18th centuries, losing its Saxon nave to the west of the tower and gaining at various times a new nave, chancel, aisles and two chapels east of the tower. St Mary's is particularly notable for its fan vaulted early 15th century Perpendicular Gothic style Wilcote chantry chapel and its early 18th century Perrott burial chapel, both of which are of unusually high quality for a village parish church.

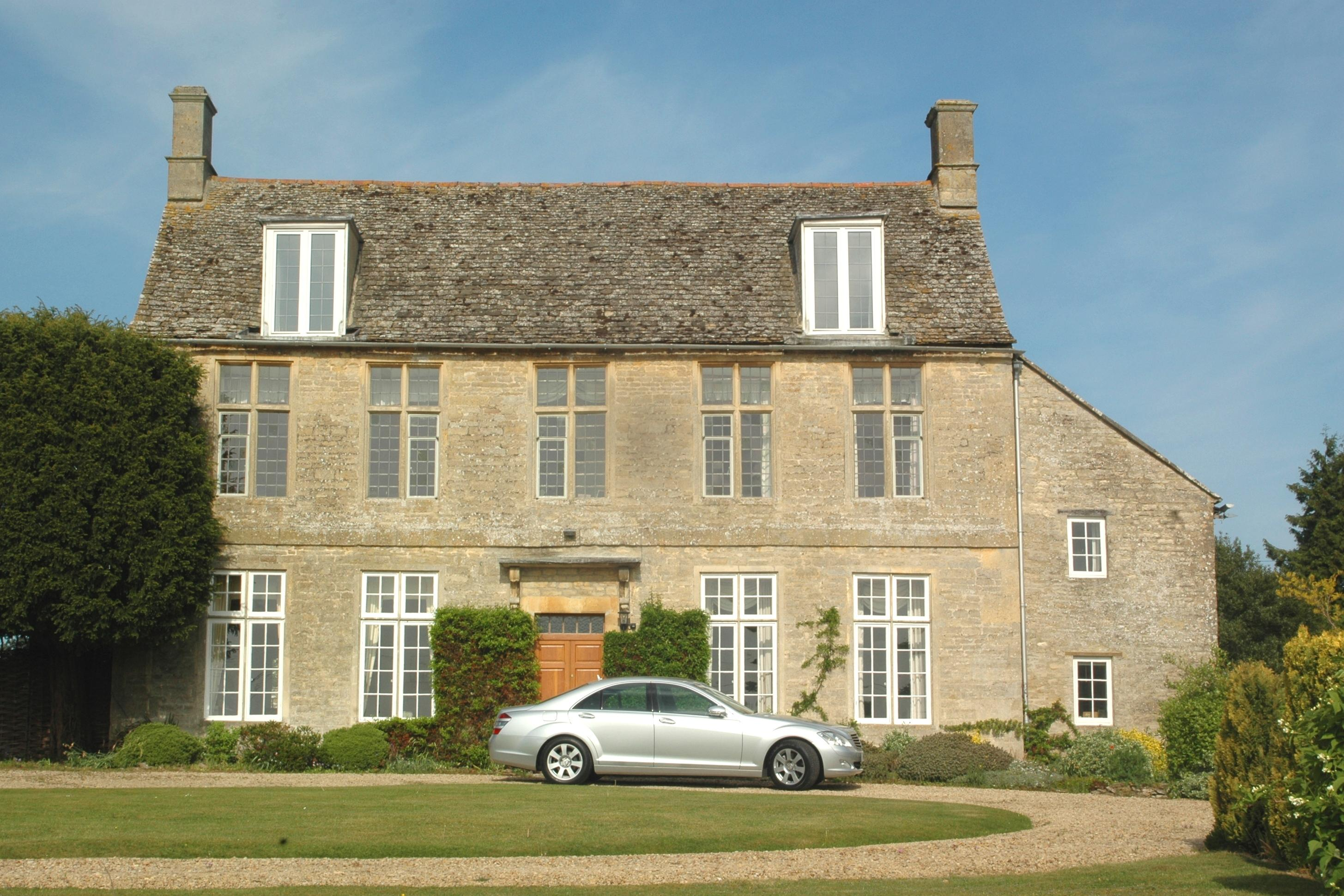
St Mary's former vicarage, rebuilt in 1726

The Gothic Revival architect GE Street restored St Mary's in 1864. The tower has a ring of six bells cast by Mears and Stainbank of the Whitechapel Bell Foundry in 1875.

Shortly after 1726 the vicarage just south of the church was demolished a new one was built. In 1811 a vicar complained that it was too small, so sometime thereafter it was extended at the back. In 1981 the Diocese of Oxford decided the vicarage was too big and sold it.

=== Other denominations ===
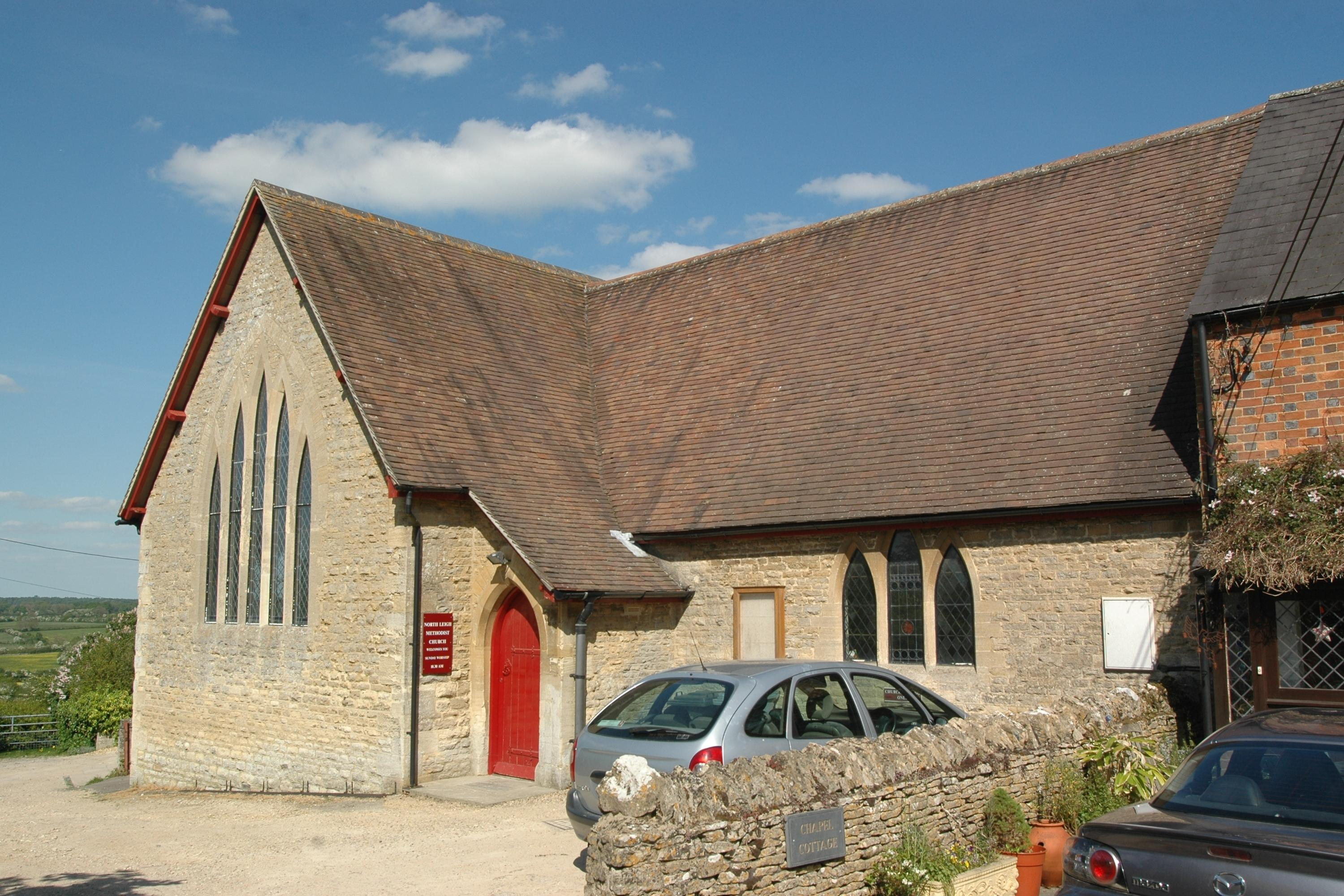
North Leigh Methodist Church, rebuilt in 1873

A Quaker congregation was meeting in North Leigh by 1659 and in 1669 was reported to attract 60 or more people to its meetings. In 1738 North Leigh still had two Quaker families but by 1768 only one elderly man and his daughter remained.

By 1770 villagers from North Leigh were attending Wesleyan meetings in the area. The Wesleyan congregation seems to have had a chapel in Chapel Lane by the 1790s, which was rebuilt in 1820. The chapel was rebuilt again in 1873 and is now North Leigh Methodist Church. Windmill Gospel Hall is a small independent church in Common Road that was built in the 20th century. Its current building is the second on the site.

== Social and economic history ==
By 1005 there was an east–west road through Bladon, Long Hanborough and North Leigh parish that was the main link between Witney and Oxford. Over the centuries its course changed and it was straightened, and in 1751 it was made into a turnpike. It ceased to be a turnpike in 1869, and the modern course of the road is now classified the A4095. In 1642 Royalist troops were billeted in the village after the English Civil War Battle of Edgehill and "plundered and pillaged" the neighbourhood. On 4 June 1644 Charles I, while retreating from Oxford, spent the night at Perrotts Hill Farm before continuing westwards to Burford.

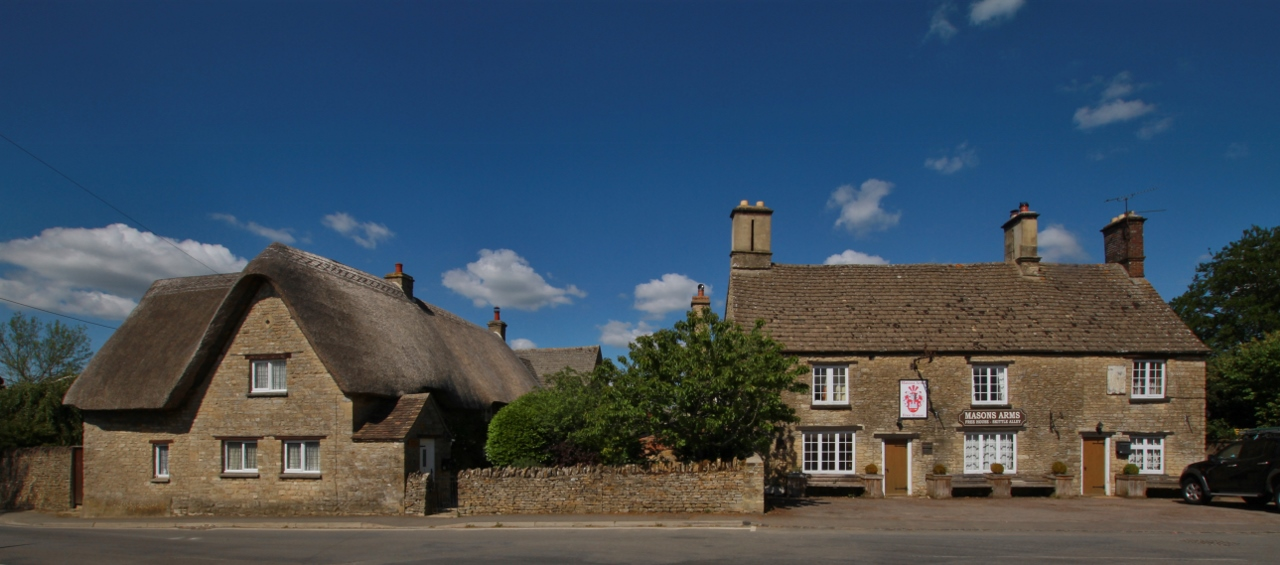
The Masons Arms (right) and Windmill Cottage (left) in Park Road

North Leigh's first record of a public house is from 1587, when Richard Breakspear was licensed as an ale-house keeper. By 1774, North Leigh had three ale-houses: the Chequers, the Dun Cow and the King's Arms, but the Chequers and the Kings Arms had ceased trading by 1795. The Dun Cow was on the main road opposite the north gate of Eynsham Park. It too had ceased trading by the 1820s. By 1847 there were two new pubs: the Harcourt Arms and the Parker Arms. The Parker Arms ceased trading about 1870. The Harcourt Arms used to be a house dating from 1783, and was turned back into a private house in 1984. North Leigh's next recorded pub was the Masons Arms, which had opened by 1871 and remains open today.

=== Windmill ===
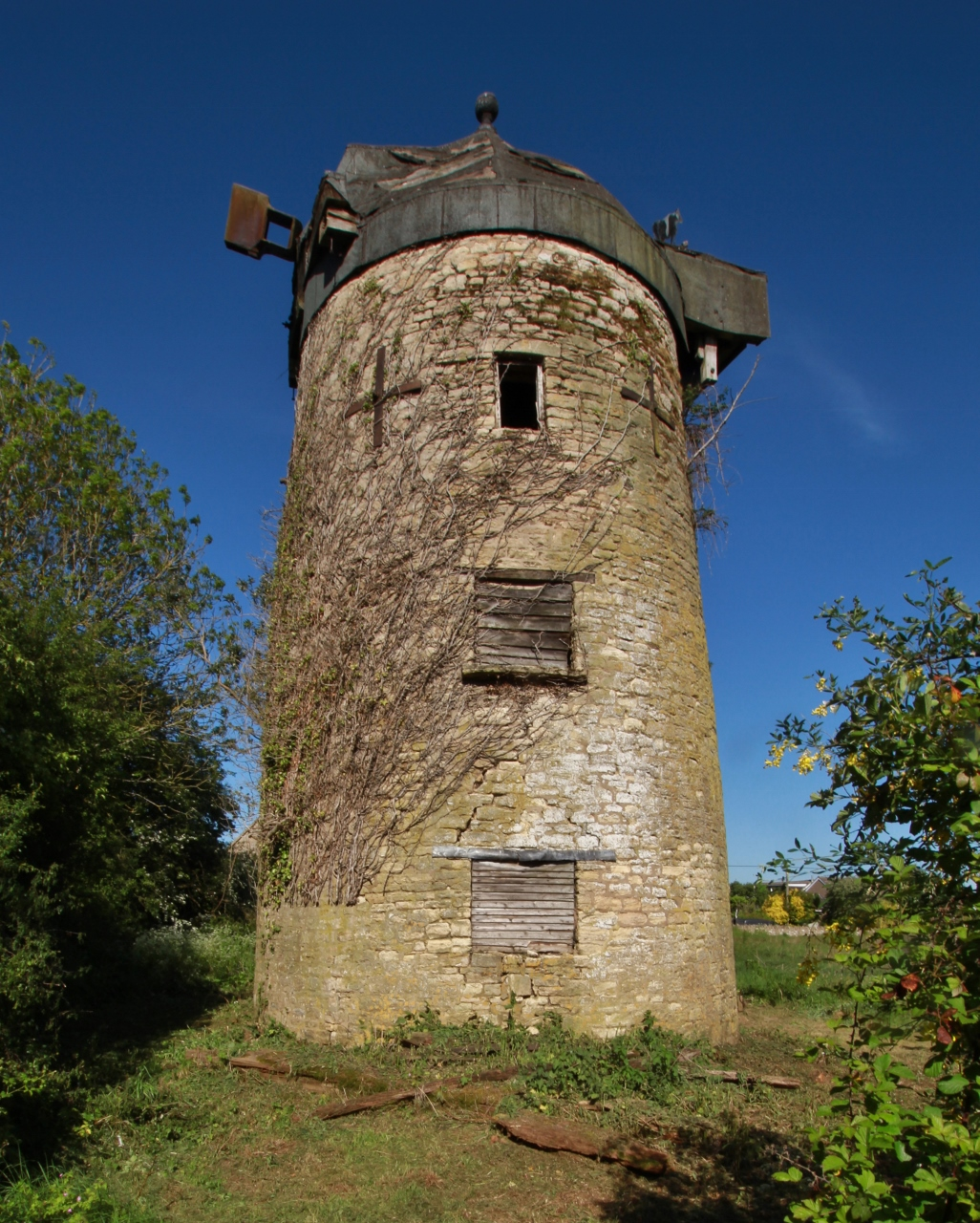
Tower windmill at North Leigh, built 1833, neglected and semi-derelict May 2019

In the centre of the village is North Leigh windmill. It is a tower mill built in 1833 by Joseph Shepherd, who was a baker as well as a miller. It had four common sails and a conical cap. The mill was restored in 1881 and 1933, but during the Second World War the cap was removed in 1940 to make an observation post. This led the interior of the building to fall into decay, and in the 1980s West Oxfordshire District Council tried to compel the owner to repair it. The mill still lacks sails, but it now has a new cap to make it weatherproof.

== School ==
In 1721 Anne Perrott, wife of the Lord of the Manor, gave money to pay for a teacher and books for children in the village. By the 1830s the village had two schools, and in 1838 George Spencer-Churchill, 5th Duke of Marlborough gave a site for a new school building into which to merge them. The school was built with a Parliamentary grant and organised as a National School. The school often had more pupils than it was built for, and was enlarged in 1854, 1871 and 1885. It was reorganised as a junior school in 1928 and became a Church of England school in 1959. The school moved to a new building on a different site in 1967, and the old school building and teacher's house were sold as private housing in 1974.

== Amenities ==
Stagecoach West route S7 serves North Leigh seven days a week. Buses run twice an hour to Witney in one direction, and to Oxford via Long Hanborough, Woodstock, Kidlington, and Oxford Parkway in the other.

North Leigh F.C. is an association football club founded in 1908. It plays in the Southern Football League Division One Central.

North Leigh has a Women's Institute.

== Sources and further reading ==
- Crossley, Alan; Elrington, CR, eds. (1990). "North Leigh". A History of the County of Oxford. Victoria County History. Vol. 12: Wootton Hundred (South) including Woodstock. London: Oxford University Press for the Institute of Historical Research. pp. 213–238. ISBN 978-0-19722-774-9.
- Emery, Frank (1974). The Oxfordshire Landscape. The Making of the English Landscape. London: Hodder & Stoughton. pp. 42, 49, 89, 132, 162, 163, 220. ISBN 0-340-04301-6.
- Foreman, Wilfrid (1983). Oxfordshire Mills. Chichester: Phillimore & Co Ltd. p. 92. ISBN 0-85033-441-1.
- Prof Hunt, John (FRS) (2010). "A History of North Leigh" (PDF).
- Leeds, E.T. (1940). "Two Saxon Cemeteries in North Oxfordshire" (PDF). Oxoniensia. V. Oxford Architectural and Historical Society: 21–32.
- Schumer, Beryl (1975). "An Elizabethan Survey of North Leigh, Oxfordshire". Oxoniensia. XL. Oxfordshire Architectural and Historical Society: 309–324. ISSN 0308-5562.
- Sherwood, Jennifer; Pevsner, Nikolaus (1974). Oxfordshire. The Buildings of England. Harmondsworth: Penguin Books. pp. 719–721. ISBN 0-14-071045-0.
