= Finstock railway station =

Railway station in Oxfordshire, England

Finstock
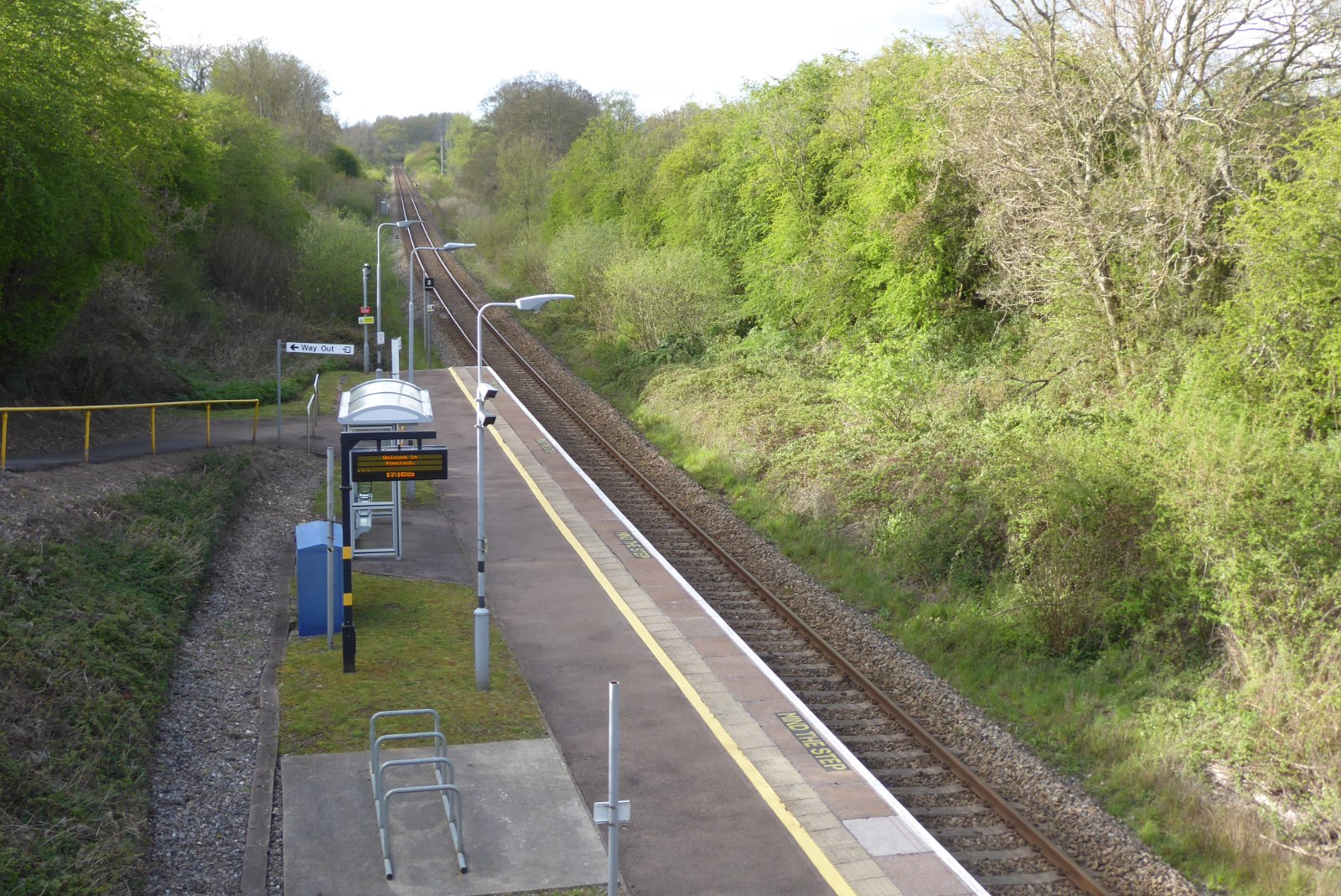
- The station seen in April 2026

General information
- Location: Finstock, West Oxfordshire; England
- Coordinates: 51.853°N 1.469°W
- Grid reference: SP366173
- Manager: Great Western Railway
- Platforms: 1

Other information
- Station code: FIN
- Classification: DfT category F2

History
- Original company: Great Western Railway
- Post-grouping: GWR

Key dates
- 9 April 1934: Opened as Finstock Halt
- 5 May 1969: Renamed Finstock

Passengers
- 2021/22: ▲364
- 2022/23: ▲706
- 2023/24: ▲1,112
- 2024/25: ▲1,136
- 2025/26: ▼1,112
Location
Notes
- Passenger statistics from the Office of Rail and Road

Finstock railway station serves the village of Finstock and the hamlet of Fawler in Oxfordshire, England. It is some distance from Finstock itself, being situated to the north-east of Charlbury Road (the present B4022), which crosses the line on an overbridge.

The station and all trains serving it are operated by Great Western Railway. Finstock is the least used station in Oxfordshire according to the official passenger statistics.

Finstock railway station featured in Geoff Marshall's YouTube series of Least Used Stations where his special guest was Ben Goldacre.

== History ==
The station was opened by the Great Western Railway (GWR) on 9 April 1934, originally being named "Finstock Halt" and having two platforms. Each platform was approached by an inclined path from Charlbury Road, and each had a corrugated iron shelter with windows only in the end walls.

On 5 May 1969 it was renamed "Finstock". The line was singled on 29 November 1971, the former up line now carrying traffic in both directions, and the redundant down platform was removed. By September 1980 the former GWR waiting shelter had been replaced by a simple shelter open on three sides. On 9 March 1987 the former up platform was taken out of use and replaced by one built over the site of the former down line. Evidence of the former up platform and access ramp is now overgrown.

A new waiting shelter was installed in winter 2021-22, after the old shelter was removed due to safety concerns.

== Services ==
Since at least February 1999 the station has been served by a minimal service of two trains per day, one in each direction.

This service is currently formed of the 08:08 train to Didcot Parkway, via Oxford, and the 17:42 train to Evesham which operate Monday-Friday only. There are currently no weekend services at the station with a normal service running on most Bank Holidays.

Preceding station	National Rail	Following station
Charlbury	Great Western Railway Cotswold Line; Monday-Friday Only	Combe
