= John Kibble (stonemason) =

British stonemason and writer

John Kibble (1865 - 1951) was a British stonemason and local historian. He is best known for his book collections of anecdotes, customs, stories and legends about Wychwood Forest, Charlbury and its surrounding villages.

== Life ==
John Kibble was born in Finstock. He followed in his father's and grandfather's footsteps to become a stonemason. His father and grandfather were considered 'unusually literate and well-versed in local affairs'. Kibble was also a Methodist lay preacher. With his work and calling he had the opportunity to visit many places and there collected the often forgotten stories that would populate his books. He later moved to Charlbury where he and his wife lived until his death.

== Stonemasonry ==
John Kibble built, but did not design, the fountain on the Playing Close in 1896 to commemorate the Diamond Jubilee of Queen Victoria, her visit to Charlbury to visit the recently bereaved Lady Churchill at Cornbury, and the new town waterworks. John Kibble carved many of the gravestones in Charlbury Cemetery and the statue of Queen Victoria in the Museum.

== Bibliography ==
- Historical and Other Notes on the Ancient Manor of Charlbury and its nine hamlets (1927)
- Historical and Other Notes on Wychwood Forest and many of its Border Places (1928) - Re-issued by Wychwood Press (1999)
- Charming Charlbury: A Wychwood Gem (1930) - Re-issued by Wychwood Press (1999)
