= Finstock =

Village in Oxfordshire, England

Coordinates: 51.847°N 1.477°W

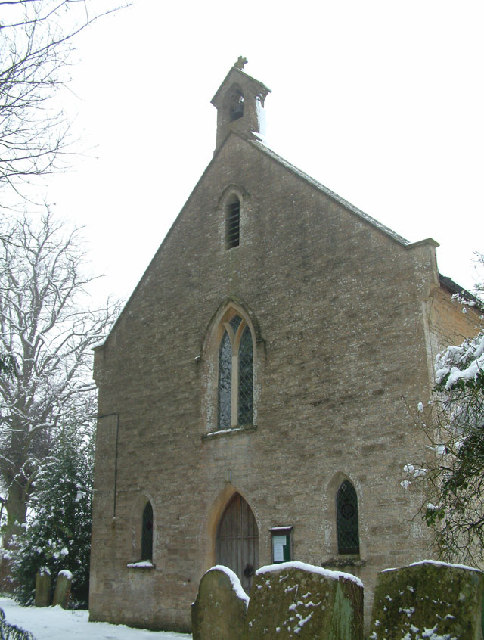
- Holy Trinity parish church

- Location within Oxfordshire
- Population: 797 (2011 Census)
- OS grid reference: SP3616
- Civil parish: Finstock
- District: West Oxfordshire
- Shire county: Oxfordshire
- Region: South East
- Country: England
- Sovereign state: United Kingdom
- Post town: Chipping Norton
- Postcode district: OX7
- Dialling code: 01993
- Police: Thames Valley
- Fire: Oxfordshire
- Ambulance: South Central
- UK Parliament: Banbury
- Website: Finstock Village & Community

Finstock is a village and civil parish about 2 miles (3 km) south of Charlbury in Oxfordshire, England.

The parish is bounded to the northeast by the River Evenlode, to the southeast partly by the course of Akeman Street Roman road, and on other sides by field boundaries. The 2011 census recorded the parish's population as 797. For most of its history Finstock was a township of the ancient parish of Charlbury. Finstock became a separate civil parish in the late 19th century.

The name means "Woodpecker place".

== Archaeology ==
A palaeolithic biface was found in the parish near Mount Skippett in 1983. The artefact was found in isolation without any associated archaeological materials so it is difficult to date, but its manufacture shows a mixture of techniques from the Lower Palaeolithic (older than 200,000 years ago) and Middle Palaeolithic (200,000 to 45,000 years ago) periods. Roman coins and Romano-British potsherds have been found in the parish.

== Manor ==
It is thought that there was a settlement of some kind here at the time of the Domesday survey of 1086 when it formed part of the Hundred of Banbury belonging to the Bishop of Lincoln. In 1135 the village of Finstock is referred to as Fynstoke. In this period, the village formed part of the manor and parish of Charlbury. In the early 16th century the manor of Charlbury and its land, including Finstock, was held by Sir Thomas White, a London tailor who founded St John's College, Oxford, in 1555. The manor was then included in the college's endowment. As the college lands were owned by an absentee landlord, the land was leased to many people including the Lee family of Ditchley Park from 1592 to 1776. The college then resumed direct control until 1857, when the lordship of the manor passed to Francis Spencer, 2nd Lord Churchill of Wychwood, the owner of Cornbury Park.

It remains in the possession of Cornbury Park today although most of the manorial rights have lapsed and much of the village of Finstock is now freehold. Finstock Manor House is 17th-century and has a date stone saying 1660. It is an L-shaped house with three gables on each of its longer sides and an attic window in each gable. All the attic windows in the gables are elliptical and one is oeil-de-boeuf. The roof is of Stonesfield slate. The house is a Grade II* listed building.

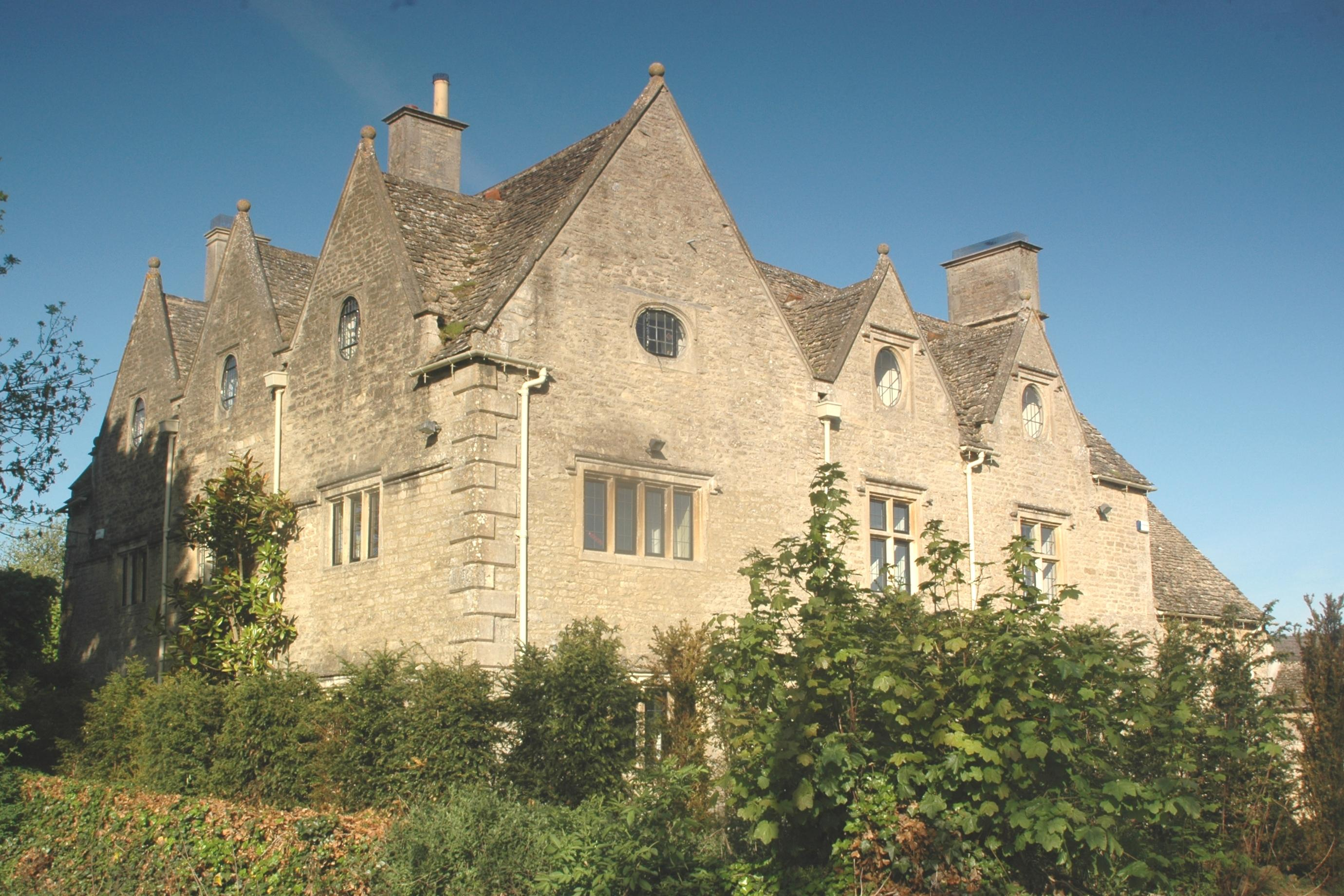
Finstock Manor House, built in 1660

== Parish church ==
Holy Trinity Church of England parish church is a Gothic Revival building of 1841. Its ornate chancel was added in 1905 and its elaborate south window by the architect Morley Horder in 1929.

T. S. Eliot came to Finstock to be received into the Church of England. William Force Stead was a fellow American and came to England as an American consul but soon found that his real bents in life were literature and religion. He was ordained, became chaplain of Worcester College, Oxford and after meeting Eliot in 1923 (with whom he shared a love of cats) steadily drew him towards Anglicanism and agreed to baptise him.

Stead was then living in "a fine seventeenth-century gabled house at Finstock", Finstock Manor, and invited Eliot to stay there to meet his godfathers, B. H. Streeter and Vere Somerset, before his baptism at Finstock on 29 June 1927. The novelist Barbara Pym lived at Finstock after her retirement and is buried in the churchyard of Holy Trinity. The current (in 2021) Vicar, the Reverend Paul Mansell, arrived in February 2010; he was trained at Ripon College, Cuddesdon and ordained at Christ Church, Oxford.

== Economic and social history ==
Finstock, together with its neighbours Charlbury, Fawler and Leafield, lay in a clearing of Wychwood Forest that used to stretch from Woodstock to Burford. Much of the forest land was cleared for growing arable crops and during the Middle Ages barley was the main crop in Finstock. Other land was used for sheep grazing and many of the people of Finstock were involved in the wool industry — the carding being done by men and boys and the spinning by women. Glove making at the village hall site by the women and agricultural labouring on nearby land by the men and boys, used to be the principal occupations of the people of Finstock in the earlier part of the 20th century.

Finstock is now a separate civil and ecclesiastical parish, its population mostly living along the sides of a large triangle formed by the main Witney-Charlbury road (west to north), School Road (east) and Finstock High Street (south). Much in-filling with new buildings has further completed the triangle and four new estates were built during the 20th century. The farming now is mainly arable, barley, wheat and oilseed rape, but there is still some mixed farming.

The building of the Oxford, Worcester and Wolverhampton Railway (OW&WR) along the Evenlode Valley began in 1845 and the line was opened in 1853. It passes through the northeastern edge of Finstock parish about 1/2 mile (800 m) from the village. Originally its nearest station was Charlbury, about 2 miles (3 km) from Finstock. The Great Western Railway took over the OW&WR in 1862 and opened Finstock railway station in 1934. Now many inhabitants of Finstock commute by car and bus to Witney, Chipping Norton & Oxford.

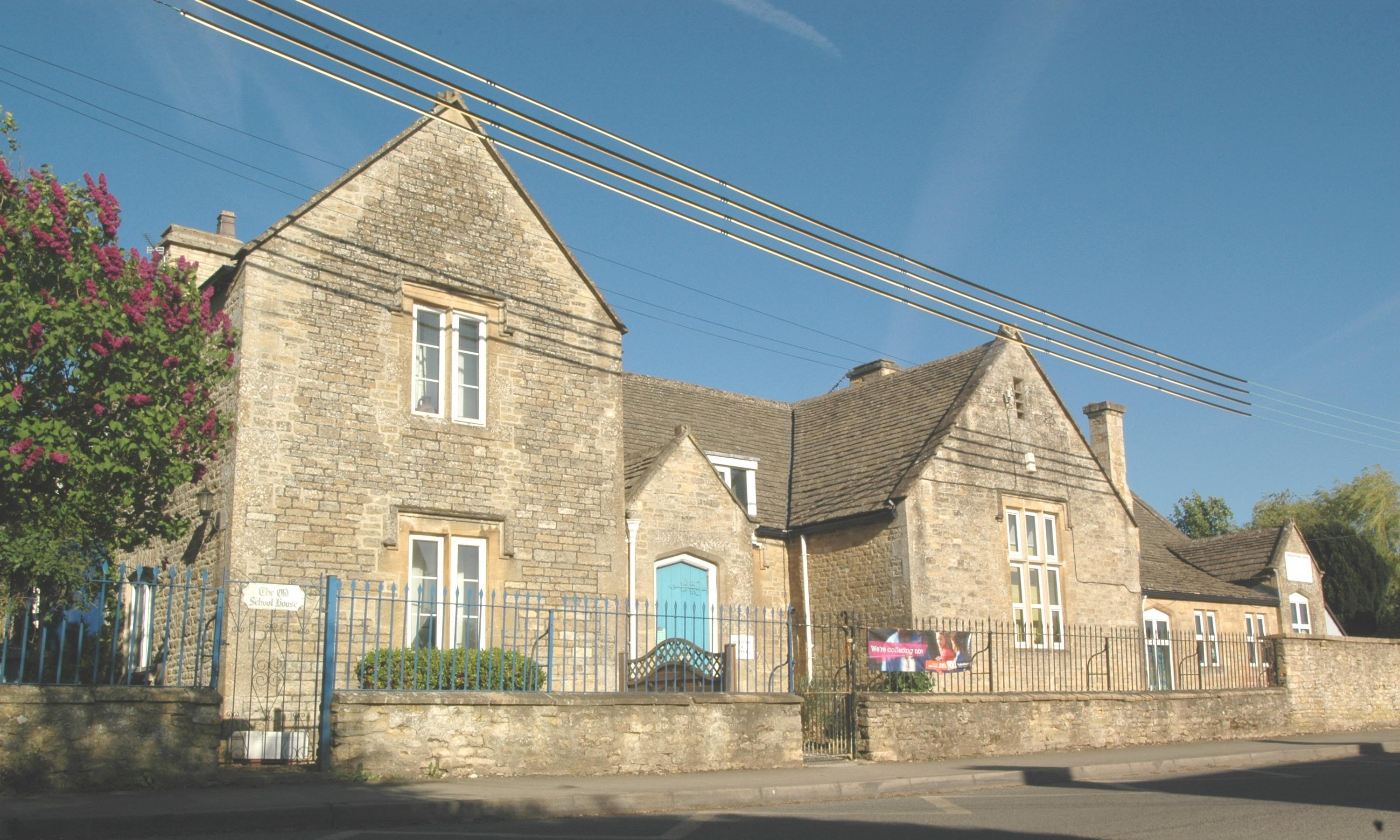
Finstock Church of England Primary School, built in 1860

== Amenities ==
Finstock has one public house: The Plough Inn. A second, The Crown, has been closed and converted into a house. Finstock had a combined village shop and sub-post office.

Finstock railway station is on the Cotswold Line. The station is between Finstock and the hamlet of Fawler. Pulhams Coaches operate a semi-regular bus service through Finstock, between Witney and Chipping Norton.

Finstock has a Church of England primary school and a Village Hall that was opened by David Cameron, then MP and Prime Minister in May 2016. It was built on the site of the old village hall that was originally built as a glove factory in 1929, and purchased as a village hall in 1939. The village hall has many regular users including a baby and toddler group, Rainbows/Brownies/Guides, Yoga, Pilates, table tennis, short-mat bowls, darts, craft club, painting, Evenlode Folk Club, Finstock Local History Society, and others.

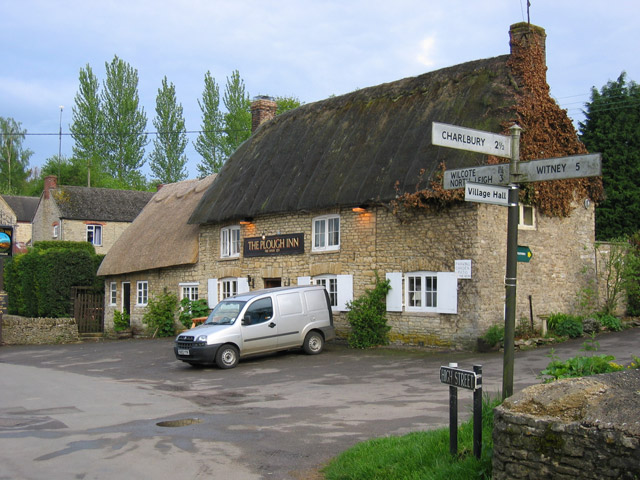
The Plough Inn, Finstock

== Notable people ==
Notable people associated with Finstock include:

- John Wesley (17 June 1703 – 2 March 1791), English cleric and founder of the Methodist Church. He stayed at Finstock Manor during his visit to preach.
- John Kibble (1865 - 1951), British stonemason, local historian and writer. Kibble was born in Finstock.
- Arthur Du Cros (26 January 1871 – 28 October 1955), British industrialist and politician. His family lived at Finstock Manor. Arthur Du Cros and family are buried in the family mausoleum in the churchyard.
- William Force Stead (29 August 1884 – 8 March 1967), American diplomat, poet and clergyman. He lived at Finstock Manor and baptised his close friend T. S. Eliot at the local church.
- T. S. Eliot (26 September 1888 – 4 January 1965) was baptised at Finstock's Holy Trinity Church on 29 June 1927.
- American singer-songwriter Brandon Schott lived in Finstock with his family for 2 years in the mid-1980s and attended the primary school there for a short time. He also took his first piano lesson in the school's event hall.
- Barbara Pym (2 June 1913 – 11 January 1980) was a Booker Prize-nominated English novelist, best known for Excellent Women (1952, A Glass of Blessings (1958) and Quartet in Autumn (1977). She lived in Finstock (Barn Cottage) from 1972-1980.
- Gilbert Phelps (3 January 1915 – 15 June 1993) was a British educationist and author, best known The Winter People (1963), lived in Finstock for a time.
- David Cameron (born 9 October 1966), Prime Minister of the United Kingdom (2010 - 2016), visited Finstock on 20 May 2016 to open the new Finstock Village Hall.

== Finstock in literature ==
- A Few Green Leaves (published 1980) by Barbara Pym. While Finstock is never actually mentioned, the author set the novel recognizably in Finstock.
- Tales of Wychwood - The Return of the Archers (published 2017). Finstock is the central location of the novel, home of the Archer clan.
- Tales of Wychwood - The Rise of the Old King (published 2024). Finstock is home of the novel's heroes.

== Citations ==
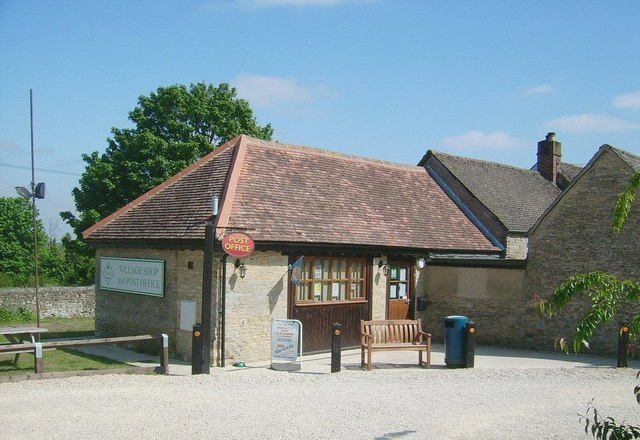
Village shop and post office in School Road

== Sources ==
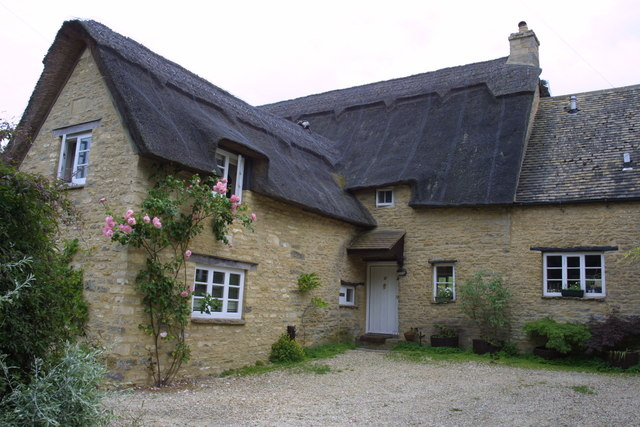
17th-century thatched cottage in the High Street

- Adamson, Donald; Sencourt, Robert (1971). T. S. Eliot: a Memoir. London: Garnstone Press. ISBN 0-900391-81-2.
- Colvin, Christina; Cooper, Janet; Cooper, N.H.; Harvey, P.D.A.; Hollings, Marjory; Hook, Judith; Jessup, Mary; Lobel, Mary D.; Mason, J.F.A.; Trinder, B.S.; Turner, Hilary (1972). "Parishes: Charlbury". In Crossley, Alan (ed.). A History of the County of Oxford. Victoria County History. Vol. 10: Banbury Hundred. London: Oxford University Press for the Institute of Historical Research. pp. 127–157. ISBN 978-0-19722-728-2.
- Sherwood, Jennifer; Pevsner, Nikolaus (1974). Oxfordshire. The Buildings of England. Harmondsworth: Penguin Books. p. 605. ISBN 0-14-071045-0.
- Tyldesley, Joyce (1983). "A Paleaolithic Biface from Finstock, Oxfordshire". Oxoniensia. XLVIII. Oxfordshire Architectural and Historical Society: 143–144.
- Reaney, P H (1969). The Origin of English Place Names. Routledge & Kegan Paul.
- Clark Hall, John R. (1916). A Concise Anglo−Saxon Dictionary, Second Edition. The Macmillan Company.
