= Fawler =

Hamlet in Oxfordshire, England

Coordinates: 51.856°N 1.466°W

- Location within Oxfordshire
- Population: 86 (2001 census)
- OS grid reference: SP3717
- Civil parish: Fawler
- District: West Oxfordshire
- Shire county: Oxfordshire
- Region: South East
- Country: England
- Sovereign state: United Kingdom
- Post town: Chipping Norton
- Postcode district: OX7
- Dialling code: 01993
- Police: Thames Valley
- Fire: Oxfordshire
- Ambulance: South Central
- UK Parliament: Banbury

Fawler is a hamlet and civil parish in the valley of the River Evenlode, 1.5 miles (2.4 km) southeast of Charlbury in Oxfordshire, England. There are traces of a Roman villa at Oatlands Farm. The manor house was built in 1660. Finstock railway station on the Cotswold Line is closer to Fawler than to Finstock.

== Place-name ==
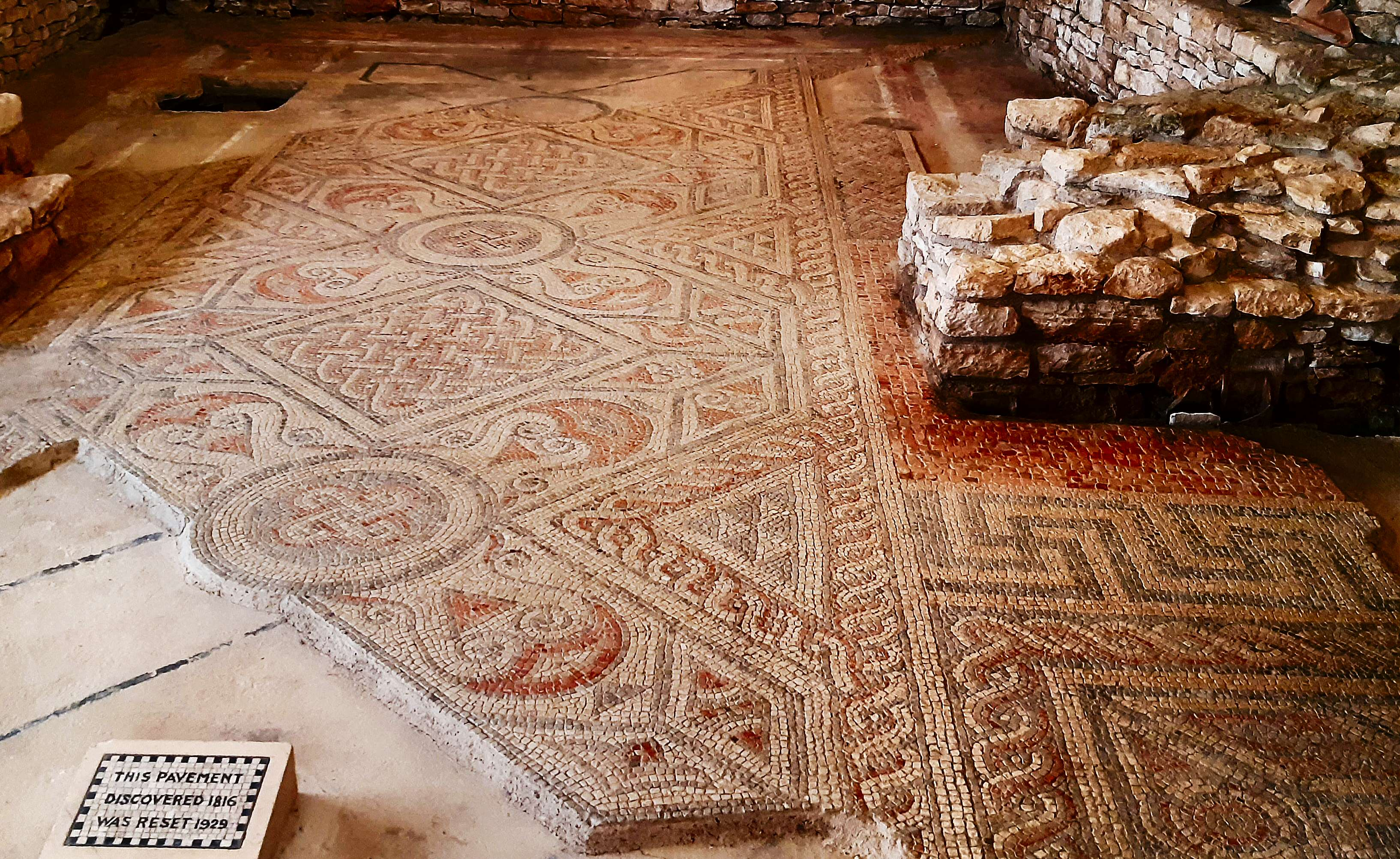
A mosaic floor at North Leigh Roman Villa near Fawler, believed to have given its name to the settlement

The place-name is recorded from 1205 as Fauflor, derived from Old English fāg flōr, "variegated floor". Authorities including the philologist J. R. R. Tolkien take this to mean a tessellated pavement, identified as the mosaic floor of North Leigh Roman Villa nearby.

== Sources ==
- Sherwood, Jennifer; Pevsner, Nikolaus (1974). Oxfordshire. The Buildings of England. Harmondsworth: Penguin Books. p. 605. ISBN 0-14-071045-0.
