= North Leigh Roman Villa =

Remains of Roman villa in Oxfordshire, England

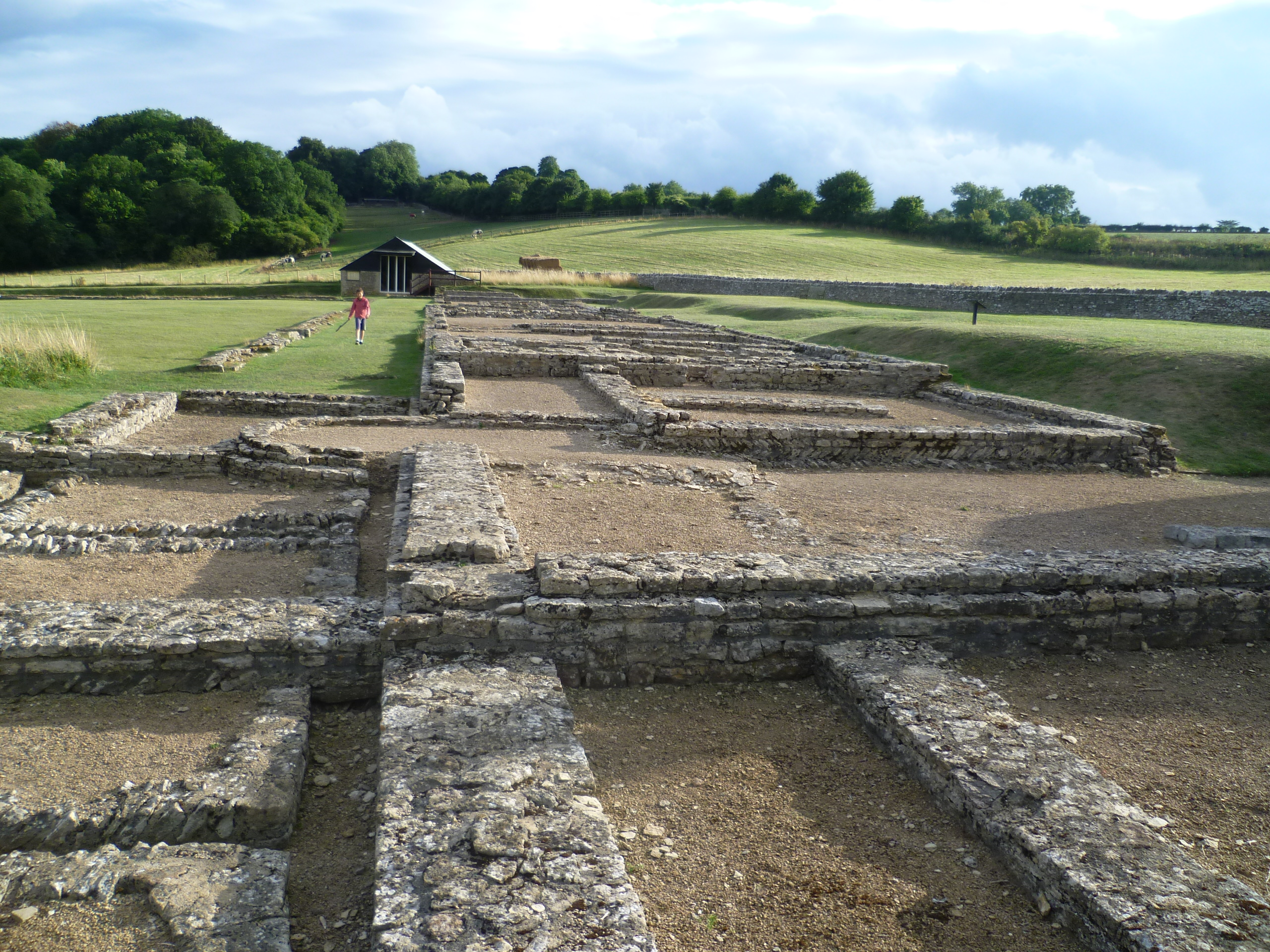
- North Leigh Roman Villa

- Location within Oxfordshire
- 51.8362°N 1.4245°W
- Type: Romano-British Villa
- Location: North Leigh, England grid reference SP397154

History
- Founded: c. 100 AD
- Demolished: c. 400 AD

Scheduled monument
- Official name: North Leigh Roman villa 300m NNE of Upper Riding Farm
- Designated: 22 March 1949
- Reference no.: 1009419

North Leigh Roman Villa was a Roman courtyard villa in the Evenlode Valley about 0.5 miles (800 m) north of the hamlet of East End in North Leigh civil parish in Oxfordshire. It is a scheduled monument in the care of English Heritage and is open to the public.

It was enlarged over time from the late 1st century AD to the early 5th century and eventually became a very large, luxurious villa rustica with 19 mosaic floors, and included a large agricultural estate with housing for farm workers and possibly slaves. Life there was very comfortable with access to the best local agricultural products and imported luxuries from sophisticated nearby towns such as Cirencester.

It remains the only visible and visitable Roman building in Oxfordshire.

== Excavations ==
The architect Henry Hakewill excavated the ruins in 1813–16. Professor Francis Haverfield conducted further excavations in 1910. Aerial archaeology in 1943 photographed the previously unknown plan of the southwest wing. Excavations for the Ministry of Public Building and Works in 1958 revealed several phases of occupation and development, starting with Iron Age postholes indicating that the first buildings on the site were wooden. The ruins were further excavated in the 1970s.

== History ==
Excavations indicate that the site was first occupied during the Late Iron Age. In the 1st or early 2nd century AD the first villa building was built. This consisted of three buildings, one of which was a bath-house, along the line of what was to become the north-west range.

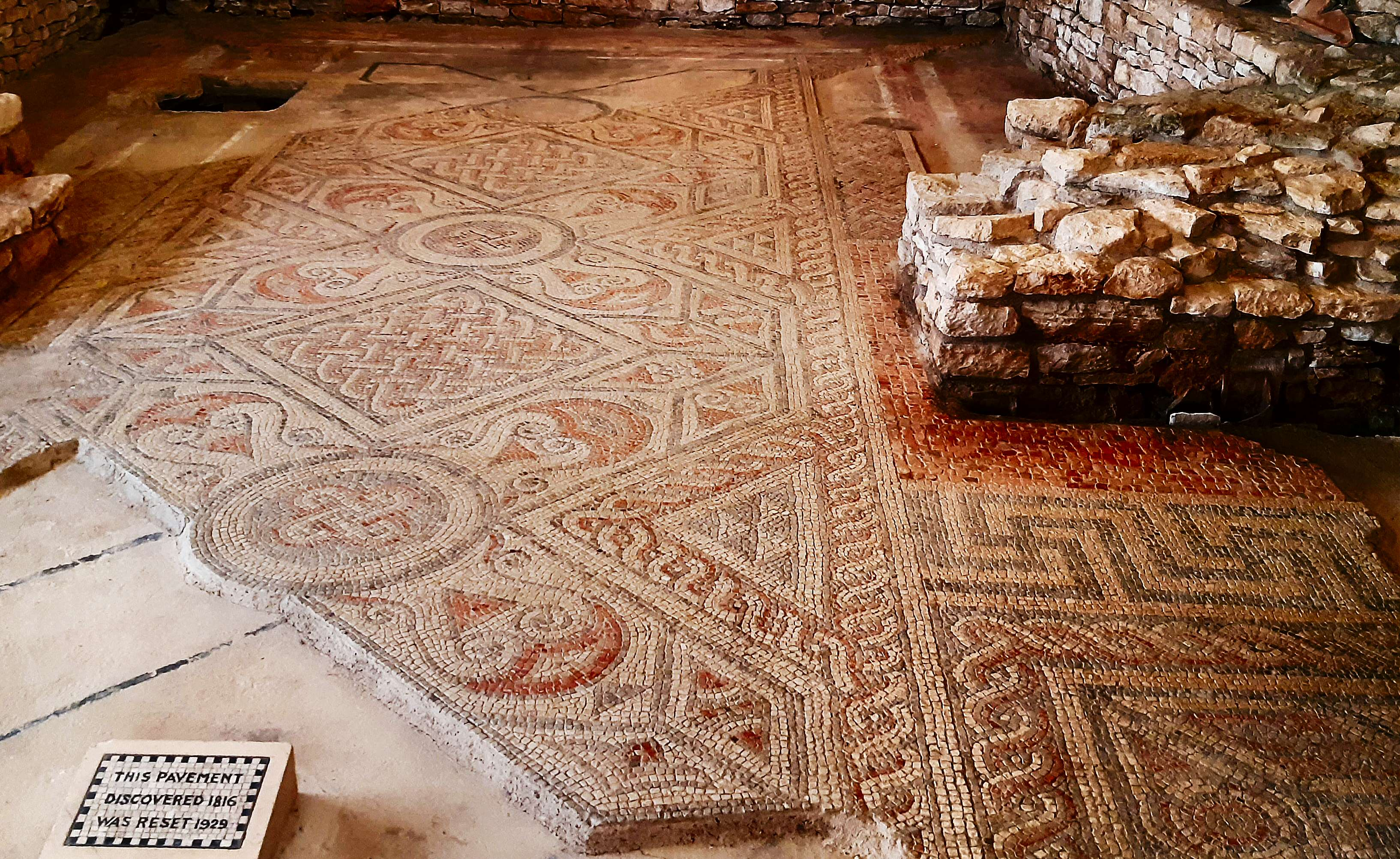
3rd century mosaic

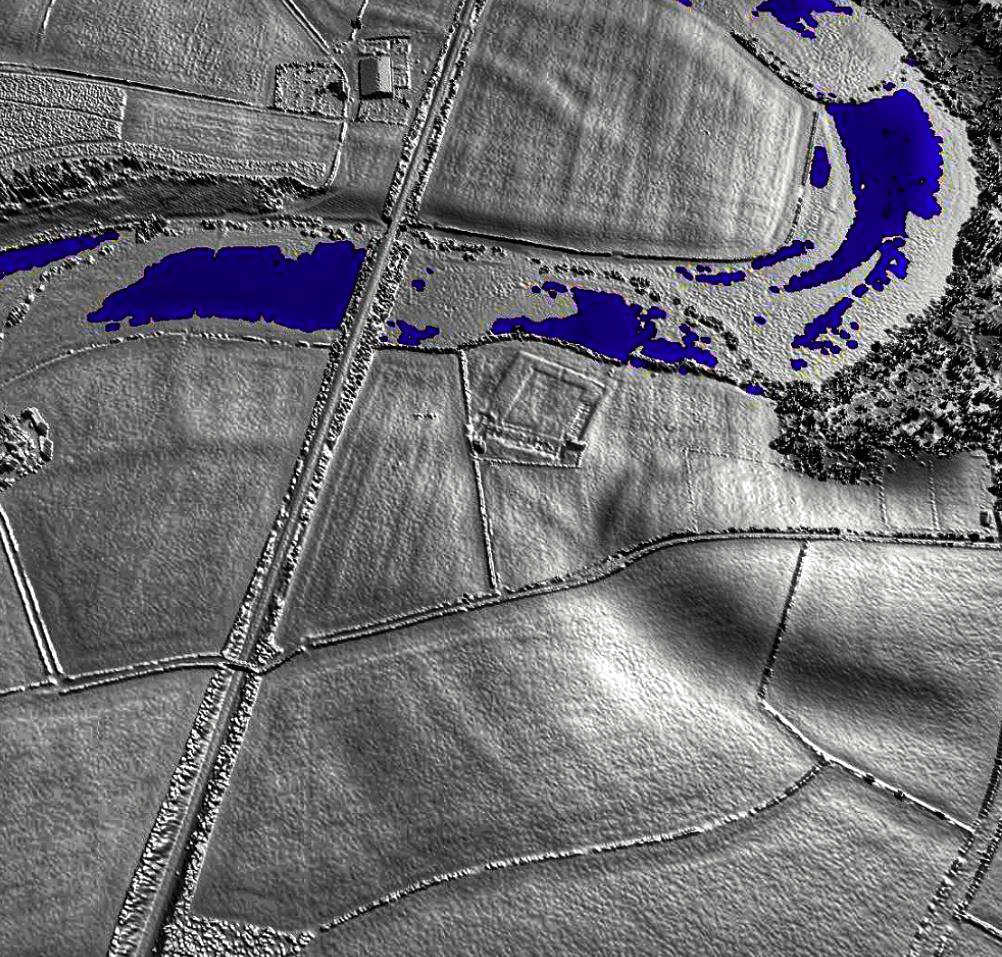
A lidar view of North Leigh Roman Villa in Oxfordshire

Early in the 3rd century the south-west and north-east wings were added, partially enclosing the courtyard. By the 4th century some of the buildings on the north western and south western ranges had been rebuilt and extended. In its 4th century form the villa had 60 rooms built on three sides of the courtyard with the fourth side formed by a corridor in which the gateway was set. The villa was luxurious, including four bath suites, 16 rooms containing mosaic pavements, 11 rooms with plain tessellated floors and another 11 rooms with under-floor hypocaust heating. Further ranges of farm buildings lie to the south west of the main complex, and aerial photographs indicate that the site extended over a large area on the west bank of the River Evenlode. The villa was abandoned in the 5th century.

The villa is notable for its 3rd century mosaic in what is believed to have been the dining room. This floor was lifted and relaid in 1929, and is now protected by a purpose-built shed. Photographs of the mosaic taken by Oxford-based photographer Henry Underhill in 1895 show the original design of the mosaic prior to its reconstruction.

== Legacy ==
The name of the nearby village of Fawler is recorded from 1205 as Fauflor, derived from Old English fāg flōr, "variegated floor". Authorities including the philologist J. R. R. Tolkien take this to mean a tessellated pavement, identified as the mosaic floor of the villa. The scholar of folklore Dimitra Fimi suggests that Tolkien echoed both the mention of a variegated floor in line 725 of Beowulf and the actual appearance of the villa's floor in his description of Meduseld, the hall of the King of Rohan in The Lord of the Rings.
