= Wroxton =

Village in Oxfordshire, England

Coordinates: 52.074°N 1.400°W

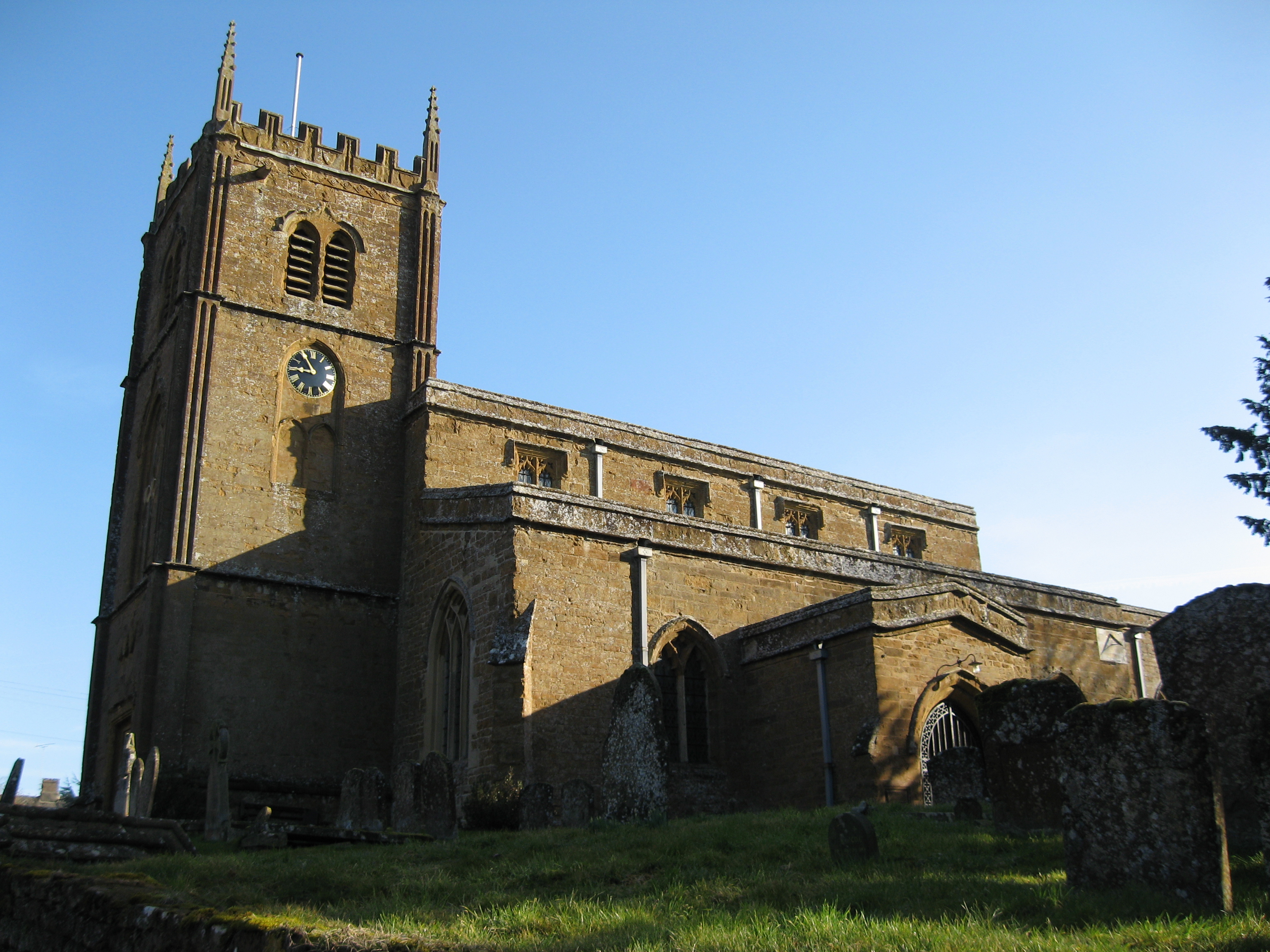
- All Saints' parish church

- Flag

- Location within Oxfordshire
- Area: 10.28 km^{2} (3.97 sq mi)
- Population: 542 (parish, including Balscote) (2021 census)
  - Density: 53/km^{2} (140/sq mi)
- OS grid reference: SP4141
- Civil parish: Wroxton
- District: Cherwell
- Shire county: Oxfordshire
- Region: South East
- Country: England
- Sovereign state: United Kingdom
- Post town: Banbury
- Postcode district: OX15
- Dialling code: 01295
- Police: Thames Valley
- Fire: Oxfordshire
- Ambulance: South Central
- UK Parliament: Banbury
- Website: Wroxton Village

Wroxton is a village and civil parish in the north of Oxfordshire, England, about 3 miles (5 km) west of Banbury. The 2011 census recorded the parish's population as 546.

== Wroxton Abbey ==
Wroxton Abbey is a Jacobean country house on the site of a former Augustinian priory. Since 1965 Wroxton Abbey has been home to Fairleigh Dickinson University. The Wroxton Abbey grounds are open to the public although during 2020 and much of 2021 they were closed due to risk of falling timber. On 3 September 2021 the grounds re-opened.

== Churches ==
=== Church of England ===
Wroxton is recorded as having a church in 1217, but the present Church of England parish church of All Saints is early 14th century. A Perpendicular Gothic clerestory and porch were added early in the 15th century. The west tower was designed by Sanderson Miller and built in 1748, paid for by Lord North, who owned Wroxton Abbey. All Saints' is a Grade II* listed building. The tower has a ring of five bells, all cast by Henry I Bagley of Chacombe in 1676. All Saints' is now one of eight neighbouring parishes in the Benefice of Ironstone. It is the final resting place of Lord North, who was Prime Minister of Great Britain from 1770 to 1782 and led Britain through most of the American War of Independence.

=== Roman Catholic ===
The Roman Catholic church of Saint Thomas of Canterbury was built in 1894. It is unusual in having a thatched roof.

=== Methodist ===
Goodman Methodist Church was built in 1935 and was a member of Banbury Methodist Circuit. It is now a private house.

== Oxfordshire Ironstone Railway ==
An ironstone quarry northwest of the village was opened in 1917 and worked heavily in the Second World War. It had its own railway, the Oxfordshire Ironstone Railway, that linked it to the Great Western Railway near Banbury. The quarry and its railway closed in 1967. A newer quarry close by is now served by road transport only.

== Amenities ==
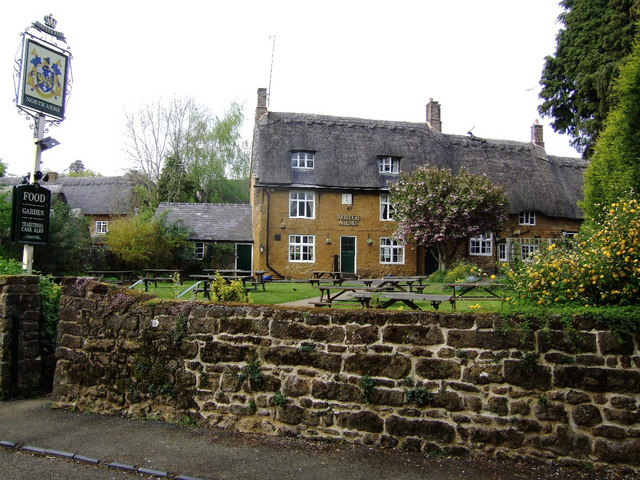
The North Arms

Wroxton has a hotel and two public houses, both public houses are closed and one is currently for sale. The North Arms in Mills Lane, named after Lord North, is 17th-century with a 19th-century extension. It was controlled by Greene King Brewery. Wroxton Abbey who were fundraising to restore the pub abandoned their plans in February 2021 citing the impacts of the COVID-19 pandemic. The White Horse in Stratford Road is mid-18th-century. Its proprietors state it was built in 1730 and has been licensed as a pub since 1756. The Wroxton House Hotel is also in Stratford Road. It is formed from four cottages, dating from the 17th to the 19th centuries. It is operated by Best Western. Wroxton Church of England Primary School is in Lampitts Green.

== Sources and further reading ==
- Chambers, R.A.; Harman, Mary (1986). "Romano-British Burials from Wroxton, Oxon. 1980" (PDF). Oxoniensia. LI. Oxfordshire Architectural and Historical Society: 38–56.
- Lobel, Mary D; Crossley, Alan, eds. (1969). A History of the County of Oxford. Victoria County History. Vol. 9: Bloxham Hundred. London: Oxford University Press for the Institute of Historical Research. pp. 171–188. ISBN 978-0-19722-726-8.
- Page, W.H., ed. (1907). A History of the County of Oxford. Victoria County History. Vol. 2: Ecclesiastical History, etc. Westminster: Archibald Constable & Co. pp. 101–102.
- Sherwood, Jennifer; Pevsner, Nikolaus (1974). Oxfordshire. The Buildings of England. Harmondsworth: Penguin Books. pp. 860–862. ISBN 0-14-071045-0.
- Tonks, Eric (April 1988). The Ironstone Quarries of the Midlands Part 2: The Oxfordshire Field. Cheltenham: Runpast Publishing. p. 146. ISBN 1-870-754-026.
