= Wilcote =

Hamlet in Oxfordshire, England

Coordinates: 51.835°N 1.463°W

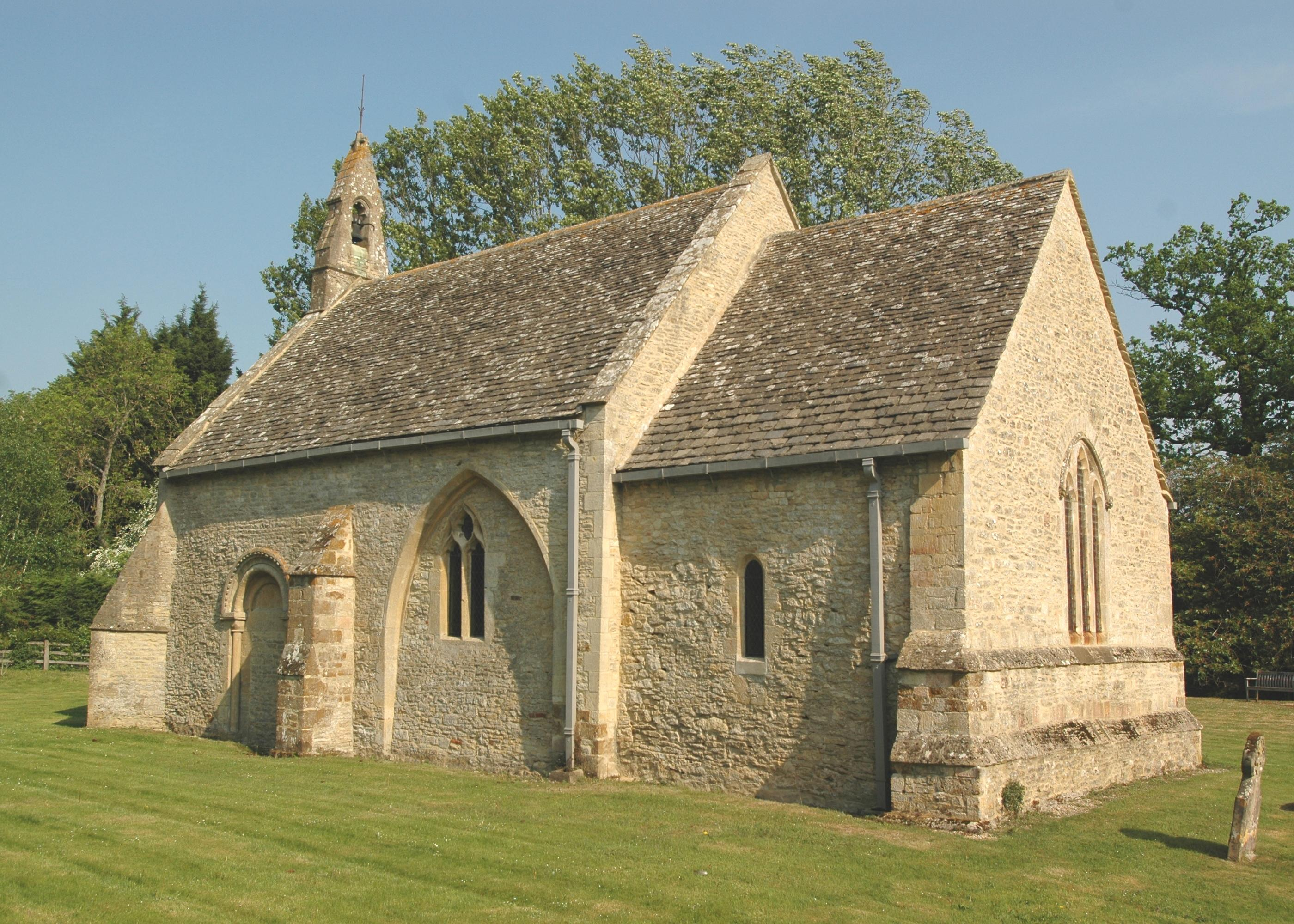
- St Peter's parish church from the southeast

- Location within Oxfordshire
- OS grid reference: SP3715
- Civil parish: North Leigh
- District: West Oxfordshire
- Shire county: Oxfordshire
- Region: South East
- Country: England
- Sovereign state: United Kingdom
- Post town: Chipping Norton
- Postcode district: OX7
- Dialling code: 01993
- Police: Thames Valley
- Fire: Oxfordshire
- Ambulance: South Central
- UK Parliament: Witney
- Website: North Leigh

Wilcote is a hamlet in the civil parish of North Leigh, in the West Oxfordshire district, in Oxfordshire, England, about 3 1/2 miles (5.6 km) north of Witney.

Wilcote was a hamlet of Cogges from at least the Middle Ages until the middle of the 19th century. It was then made a separate civil parish — one of the smallest in England. In 1931 the parish had a population of 15. On 1 April 1932 Wilcote civil parish was absorbed into that of North Leigh.

== Archaeology ==
Akeman Street Roman road passes through the northern part of the former parish. A Roman villa at Shakenoak Farm was excavated in the 1960s. The villa was built late in the 1st century AD, enlarged more than once but remained smaller and less opulent than the nearby North Leigh Roman Villa. Shakenoak villa was occupied until the middle of the 3rd century, when it seems to have been succeeded by a small farmhouse nearby that was occupied until about AD 420, shortly after the Roman withdrawal from Britain. The site was then abandoned and left unoccupied for about two centuries.

The Roman site was reoccupied from the 7th century until the middle of the 8th century, when the bodies of several men were buried there and the site was abandoned again. A Saxon charter of AD 1044 referring to "Yccenes feld, where the cnihtas lie" implies that these burials were remembered locally three centuries later. Yccenes is an Old English form of "Itchen", implying contact between Romano-Britons and Anglo-Saxons, and cnihtas means "servants" or "soldiers".

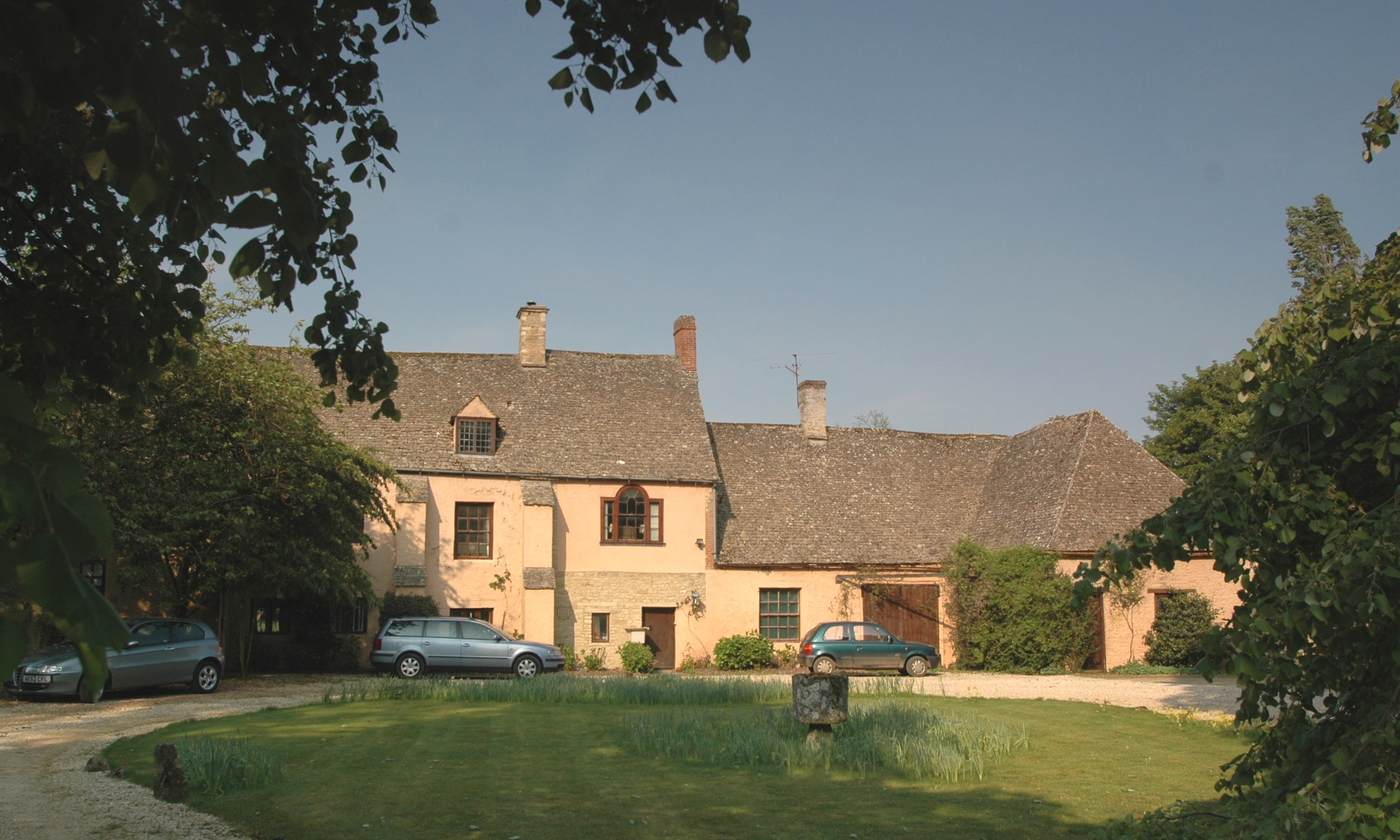
Wilcote Manor house: late 16th- or early 17th-century house with later additions and alterations

== Manor ==
The Domesday Book of 1086 records that after the Norman Conquest of England the manor of Wilcote had become one of the many Oxfordshire estates held by William of Normandy's half-brother Odo, Bishop of Bayeux. After Odo was deposed, Wilcote was granted to Manasser Arsic, Baron of Cogges.

The present manor house was built in the late 16th or early 17th century and has some 18th-century alterations and 19th- and 20th-century additions. It is presumed to be on the site of the medieval manor house, which by the 15th century was called Butler's Court.

== Parish church ==
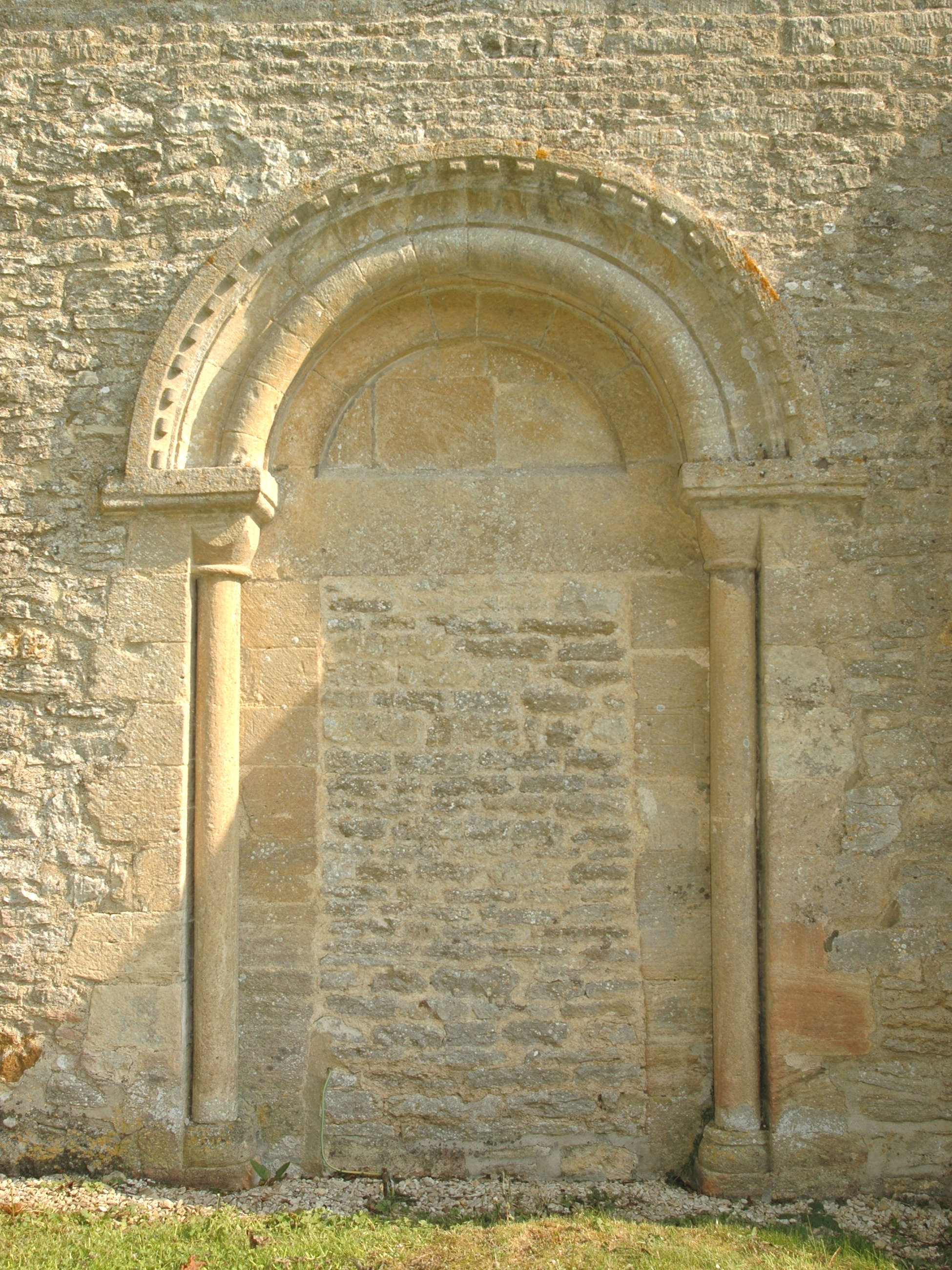
St Peter's church: late 12th-century south doorway from the outside, showing Norman arch on cushion capitals

The Church of England parish church of Saint Peter was built in the latter part of the 12th century, and the blocked Norman south doorway is the most notable feature from this period. Its jamb shafts have cushion capitals. The earliest record of a parish priest is of one Geoffrey, who was installed between 1209 and 1219.

The chancel east wall and chancel arch were rebuilt in the 13th century. The arch is Early English and is carried on head corbels. Early in the 14th century a south chapel was built onto the nave, the north doorway was rebuilt and new windows were inserted in the north and west walls. Also in the 14th century, a small three-light east window was inserted in the chancel and the present Decorated Gothic piscina, credence table and aumbry were installed. In 1545 the church had a rood screen. There is a squint between the nave and the chancel.

By 1844 the south chapel had been removed. In that year the Oxford Architectural Society surveyed the church and recommended rebuilding it in the Decorated Gothic style. Henry Woodyer supervised a restoration in 1853 but already by 1868 it was reported that only the walls were "fit to be left up" and a new restoration was begun under the supervision of Arthur Blomfield. Both the nave and chancel were re-roofed, the porch was rebuilt, a bellcote was added to the west gable of the nave and a bell was hung. The east window of the chancel was replaced by a larger one in a 13th-century style. This was glazed and the nave west windows were re-glazed with stained glass by Heaton, Butler and Bayne of London. The church doors were replaced and new pews installed.

St Peter's is a Grade II* listed building. The parish is now part of the same Benefice as Finstock, Leafield and Ramsden. Despite the very small size of the parish, St Peter's is an active church within the wider Benefice with services currently taking place every Friday (Evening Prayer) and any fifth Sunday in a calendar month (Holy Communion).

== Sources and further reading ==
- Brodribb, A.C.C.; Hands, A.R.; Walker, D.R. (1968). Excavations at Shakenoak Farm, near Wilcote, Oxfordshire. Vol. I: sites A & D. published privately.
- Brodribb, A.C.C.; Hands, A.R.; Walker, D.R. (1971) [1968]. Excavations at Shakenoak Farm, near Wilcote, Oxfordshire. Vol. II: sites B & H. published privately.
- Brodribb, A.C.C.; Hands, A.R.; Walker, D.R. (1972). Excavations at Shakenoak Farm, near Wilcote, Oxfordshire. Vol. III: site F. published privately.
- Brodribb, A.C.C.; Hands, A.R.; Walker, D.R. (1971). Excavations at Shakenoak Farm, near Wilcote, Oxfordshire. Vol. IV. published privately.
- Crossley, Alan; Elrington, C.R., eds. (1990). A History of the County of Oxford. Victoria County History. Vol. 12: Wootton Hundred (South) including Woodstock. London: Oxford University Press for the Institute of Historical Research. pp. 296–304. ISBN 978-0-19722-774-9.
- Gelling, Margaret (1967). "English place-names derived from the compound Wicham". Medieval Archaeology. XI. The Society for Medieval Archaeology: 103. doi:10.5284/1071471.
- Hands, A.R. (2005). The Roman Villa at Shakenoak Farm, Oxfordshire, Excavations 1960–1976. British Archaeological Reports. ISBN 1-84171-857-2.
- Sherwood, Jennifer; Pevsner, Nikolaus (1974). Oxfordshire. The Buildings of England. Harmondsworth: Penguin Books. pp. 842–843. ISBN 0-14-071045-0.
