= Wroxton Abbey =

Grade I listed manor house in Cherwell, United Kingdom

Coordinates: 52.0714°N 1.3936°W

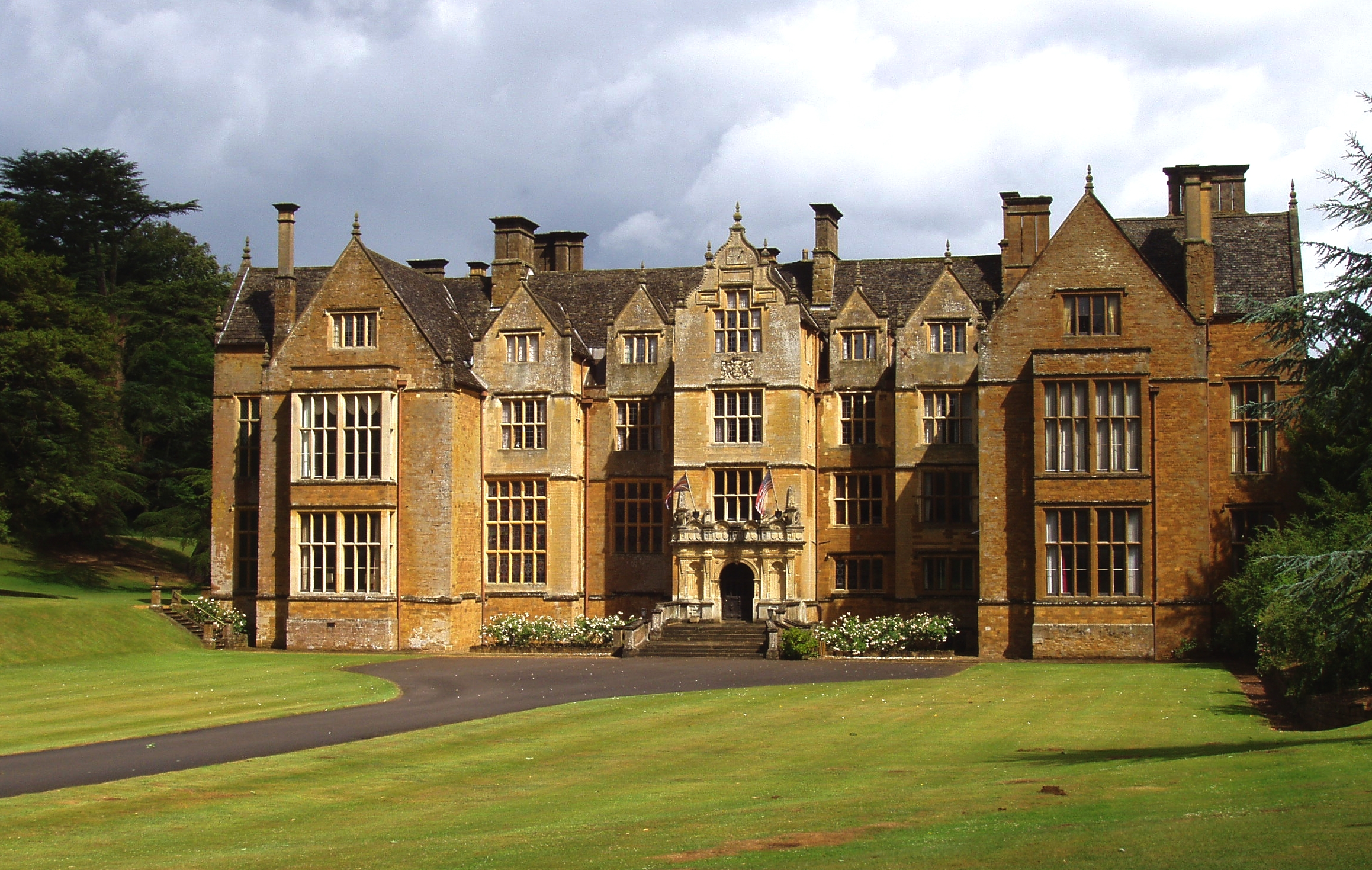
Wroxton Abbey

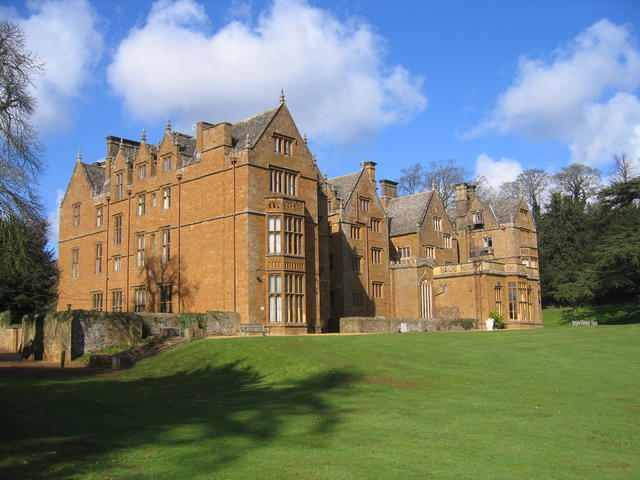
Wroxton Abbey, rear view

Wroxton Abbey is a Jacobean house in Oxfordshire, with a 1727 garden partly converted to the serpentine style between 1731 and 1751. It is 2.5 miles (4 km) west of Banbury, off the A422 road in Wroxton.

Wroxton Abbey is a modernised 17th-century Jacobean manor house built on the foundations of a 13th-century Augustinian priory. The abbey boasts a great hall, minstrels' gallery, chapel, multi-room library, and royal bedrooms. In addition, there are 45 bedrooms (each with private bath), seminar rooms, offices, basement recreation rooms, and a reception area.

Wroxton Abbey, named for its 12th-century origins as a monastery that was destroyed after Henry VIII's 1536 Dissolution of the Monasteries. Remnants of that structure remain in the cellarage, so that the building literally rose from the ruins when rebuilt by William Pope, 1st Earl of Downe, in the early 17th century. Further additions were made over the following centuries: the property passed from the Popes to the Norths in 1677. The elaborate monuments of the early Pope and North residents are in Wroxton church.

The various Lords North and their families, including Frederick, Lord North and their royal, literary, and Presidential visitors—James I in 1605, Charles I on 13 July 1643, George IV in 1805, 06 and 08, William IV, Theodore Roosevelt in 1887 where he slept in William IV the Duke of Clarence's bed, Horace Walpole, Henry James, Frederick, Prince of Wales as well as the structure itself, led to the Abbey's designation as a Grade One Listed Building.

The grounds comprise 56 acres (23 ha) of lawns, lakes, and woodlands, and include a serpentine lake, a cascade, a rill and a number of follies: the Gothic Dovecote attributed to Sanderson Miller and his Temple-on-the-Mount; the Drayton Arch was built by David Hiorn in 1771. William Andrews Nesfield advised on a formal flower garden on the south side of the house. A knot garden has been added in the 20th century and was illustrated by Blomfield as an example of a "modern garden".

== History of Wroxton College ==
The North Family sold off the art and furnishings and returned the Wroxton Abbey lease to Trinity College, Oxford in 1932. In 1963, the property was sold to New Jersey–based Fairleigh Dickinson University. In 2025, Wroxton College became an independent educational institution through Wroxton College Educational Services (WCES), an independent charitable organization.

Since 1963, Wroxton College has partnered with U.S. institutions to offer immersive academic programs grounded in British educational tradition. Today, Wroxton College Educational Services (WCES), an independent charitable organization, stewards the Abbey and its academic mission.

This campus serves American students, studying under the British tutorial system. Students study a rigorous curriculum in a variety of courses focused on humanities including several political science, English, art, and other social science courses. In addition to Wroxton's own lecturers, guest lecturers from other British universities will often supplement the academic experience. Wroxton College is accredited by Accreditation Service of International Colleges and was awarded ASIC Premier College Status by that same organization.

The US Ambassador to the United Nations, Adlai Stevenson II, was scheduled to speak at the official dedication of Wroxton College but died after suffering a heart attack near the US Embassy in London on 14 July 1965.
