= Varangians =

Slavic and Greek designation of Vikings

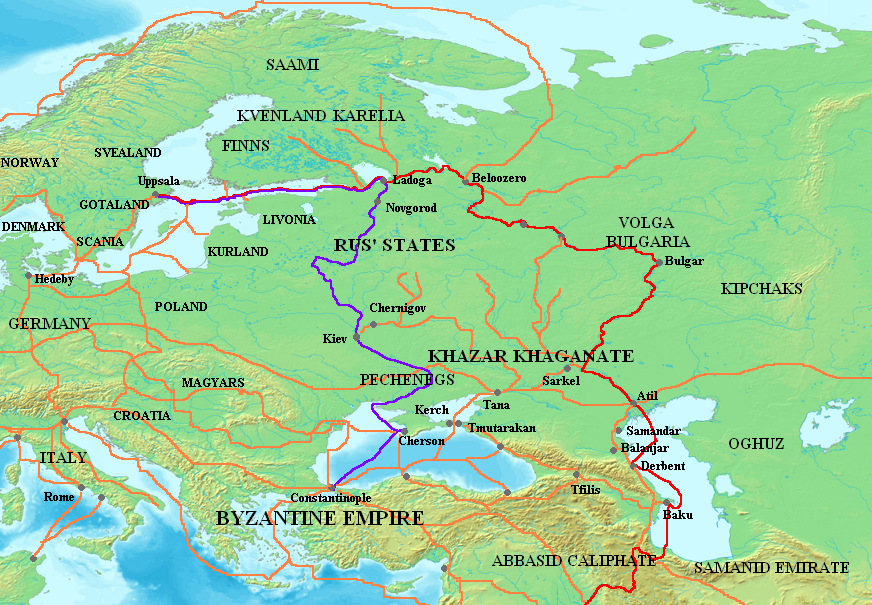
Map showing the major Varangian trade routes: the Volga trade route (in red) and the Dnieper and Dniester routes (in purple). Other trade routes of the 8th–11th centuries shown in orange.

The Varangians (/vəˈrændʒiənz/) were Viking warriors, traders and settlers, mostly from present-day Sweden, who settled in the territories of present-day Belarus, Russia and Ukraine from the 8th and 9th centuries and established the state of Kievan Rus' as well as the principalities of Polotsk and Turov. They also formed the Byzantine Varangian Guard.

According to the 12th-century Primary Chronicle, a group of Varangians known as the Rus' settled in Novgorod in 862 under the leadership of Rurik. Before Rurik, the Rus' might have ruled an earlier hypothetical polity known as the Rus' Khaganate. Rurik's relative Oleg conquered Kiev in 882 and established the state of Kievan Rus', which was later ruled by Rurik's descendants.

Engaging in trade, piracy, and mercenary service, Varangians roamed the river systems and portages of Gardariki, as the areas north of the Black Sea were known in the Norse sagas. They controlled the Volga trade route (between the Varangians and the Muslims), connecting the Baltic to the Caspian Sea and the Dnieper and Dniester trade route (between Varangians and the Greeks) leading to the Black Sea and Constantinople. Those were the main important trade links at that time, connecting Medieval Europe with the Abbasid Caliphate and the Byzantine Empire. Most of the silver coinage in the West came from the East via those routes.

Attracted by the riches of Constantinople, the Varangian Rus' began the Rus'-Byzantine Wars, some of which resulted in advantageous trade treaties. At least from the early 10th century, many Varangians served as mercenaries in the Byzantine Army, constituting the elite Varangian Guard (the bodyguards of Byzantine emperors). Eventually most of them, in Byzantium and in Eastern Europe, were converted from Norse paganism to Orthodox Christianity, culminating in the Christianization of Kievan Rus' in 988. Coinciding with the general decline of the Viking Age, the influx of Scandinavians to Rus' stopped and Varangians gradually assimilated into Slavic culture by the late 11th century.

== Etymology ==
Medieval Greek Βάραγγος Várangos and Old East Slavic варягъ varjagŭ (Old Church Slavonic варѧгъ varęgŭ) are derived from Old Norse væringi, originally a compound of vár 'pledge' or 'faith', and gengi 'companion', thus meaning 'sworn companion', 'confederate', extended to mean 'a foreigner who has taken service with a new lord by a treaty of fealty to him', or 'protégé'. Some scholars seem to assume a derivation from vár with the common suffix -ing. However, this suffix is inflected differently in Old Norse. Furthermore, the word is attested with -gangia and cognates in other Germanic languages in the Early Middle Ages; examples include Old English wærgenga, Old Frankish wargengus and Langobardic waregang. The reduction of the second part of the word could be parallel to that seen in Old Norse foringi 'leader', correspondent to Old English foregenga and Gothic 𐍆𐌰𐌿𐍂𐌰𐌲𐌰𐌲𐌲𐌾𐌰 fauragaggja 'steward'.

== Runestones ==
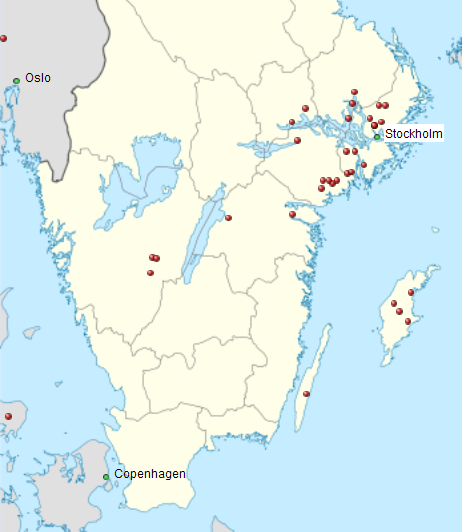
Map of geographic distribution of Varangian Runestones (almost all of which are found in present-day Sweden)

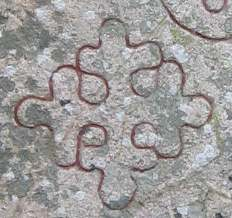
The Byzantine cross, on U 161, a cross which is today the coat of arms of the municipality of Täby, Sweden

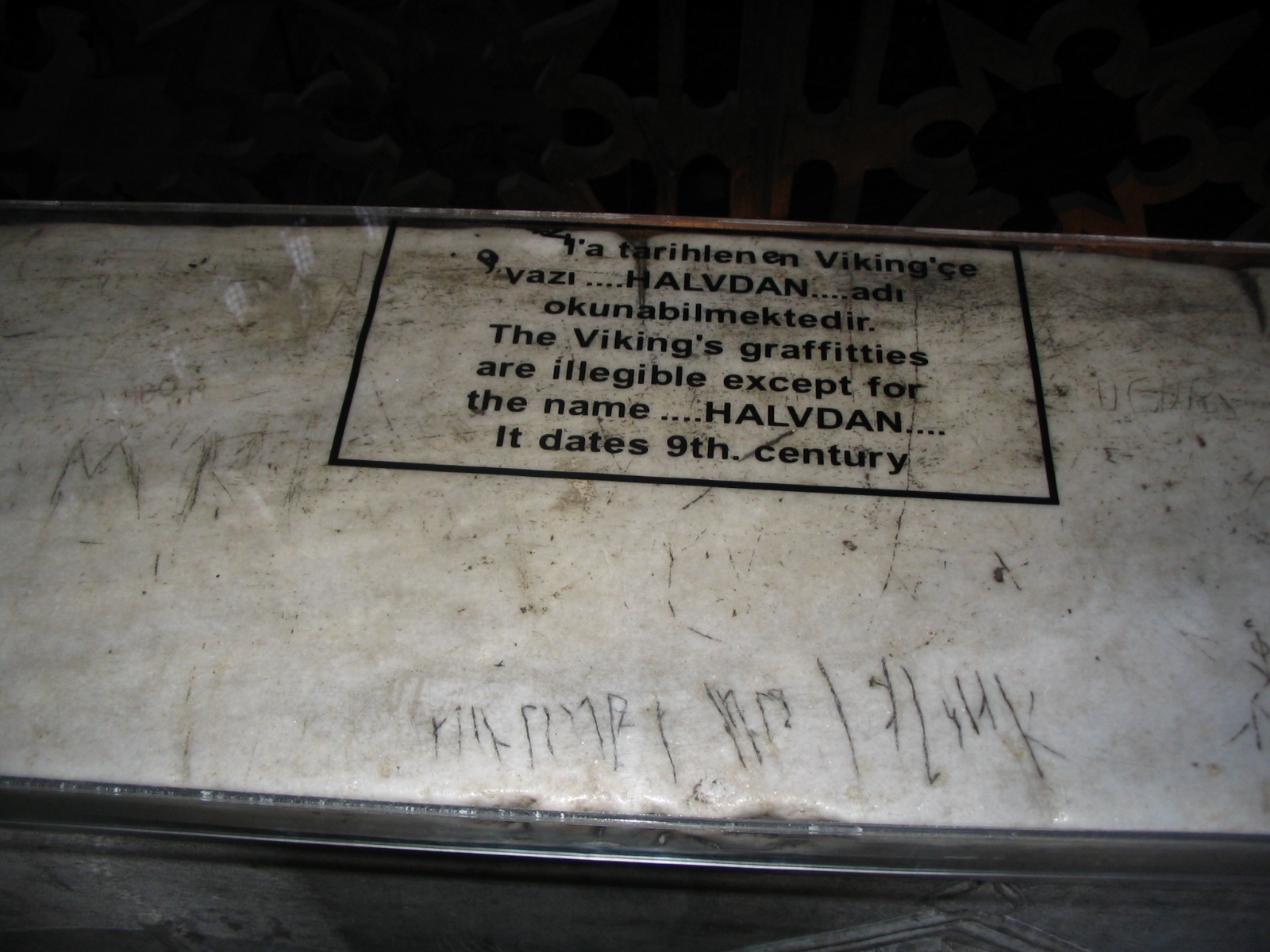
One of the runic inscriptions in Hagia Sophia, probably carved by members of the Varangian Guard

There are raised stone memorials called runestones throughout Scandinavia of which almost all are found in Sweden. Many date to the Viking Age, and there are many associated with the Varangian Guards. These Varangian runestones commemorate various fallen warriors through carved runes, and mention voyages to the East (Austr) or the Eastern route (Austrvegr), or to more specific eastern locations such as Garðaríki (what is today Russia and Ukraine). The losses that the Varangian Guard suffered are reflected by the largest group of runestones that talk of foreign voyages, such as those known as the Greece Runestones. These were raised by former members of the Varangian Guard, or in their memory. A smaller group consists of the four Italy Runestones which commemorate members of the Varangian Guard who died in southern Italy.

The oldest of the Greece runestones are six stones in the RAK style, which dates to the period before 1015 AD. The group consists of Skepptuna runestone U 358, Västra Ledinge runestone U 518, Nälberga runestone Sö 170 and Eriksstad runestone Sm 46.

One of the later runestones in the Pr4 style is Ed runestone U 112, a large boulder at the western shore of the lake of Ed. It tells that Ragnvaldr, the captain of the Varangian Guard, had returned home where he had the inscriptions made in memory of his dead mother.

The youngest runestones, in the Pr5 style, such as Ed runestone U 104 (presently in the Ashmolean Museum in Oxford), are dated to the period 1080–1130, after which runestones became unfashionable.

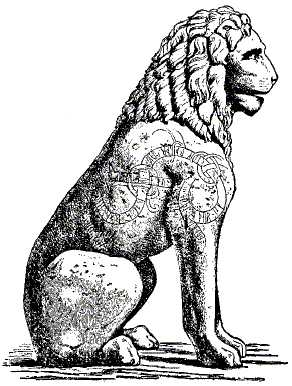
Piraeus Lion drawing of curved lindworm. The runes on the lion tell of Swedish warriors, most likely Varangians, mercenaries in the service of the Byzantine (Eastern Roman) Emperor.

The Varangians returned home with some influence from Byzantine culture, as exemplified by the Byzantine cross carved on the early eleventh-century Risbyle runestone U 161, and which today is the coat-of-arms of Täby, a trimunicipal locality and the seat of Täby Municipality in Stockholm County, Sweden. The runes were made by the runemaster Viking Ulf of Borresta, see Orkesta runestone U 344, in memory of another Ulf, in Skålhamra, and at the request of the latter's father.

== Kievan Rus' ==
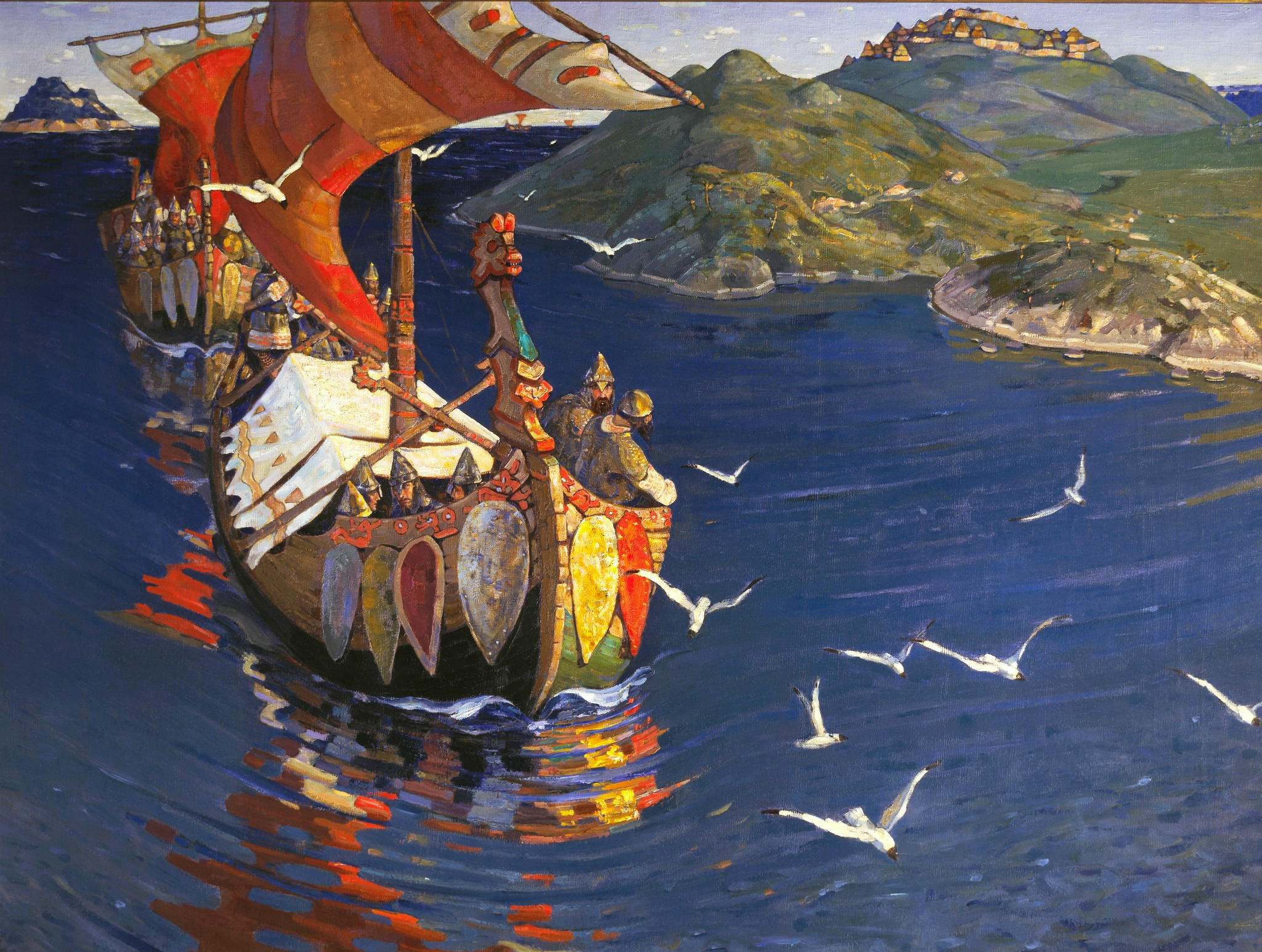
Nicholas Roerich: Guests from Overseas (1899)

In the 9th century, the Rus' operated the Volga trade route, which connected Northern Rus (Garðaríki) with the Middle East (Serkland). The Volga route declined by the end of the century, and the Dnieper and Dniester routes rapidly overtook it in importance. Apart from Ladoga and Novgorod, Gnyozdovo and Gotland were major centers for Varangian trade.

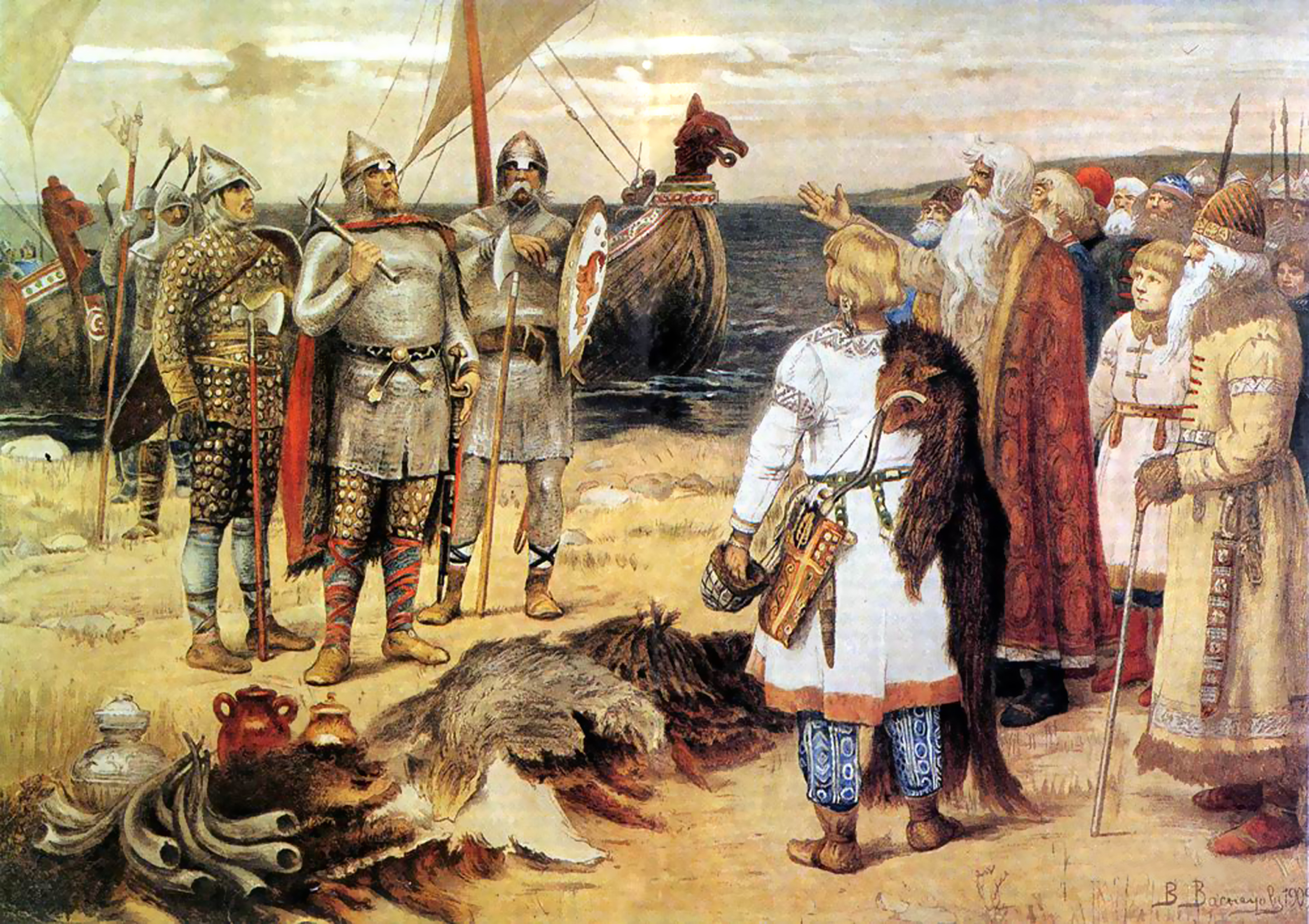
Viktor Vasnetsov, The Invitation of the Varangians: Rurik and his brothers arrive in Staraya Ladoga.

Having settled Aldeigja (Ladoga) in the 750s, Norse colonists played an important role in the early ethnogenesis of the Rus' people and in the formation of the Rus' Khaganate. The Varangians (Varyags, in Old East Slavic) are first mentioned by the Primary Chronicle as having exacted tribute from the Slavic and Finnic tribes in 859. It was the time of rapid expansion of the Vikings in Northern Europe; England began to pay Danegeld in 859, and the Curonians of Grobin faced an invasion by the Swedes at about the same date.

It has been argued that the word Varangian, in its many forms, does not appear in primary sources until the eleventh century (though it does appear frequently in later sources describing earlier periods). This suggests that the term Rus' was used broadly to denote Scandinavians until it became too firmly associated with the subsequent elite of Kievan Rus who assimilated Slavic culture. At that point, the new term Varangian was increasingly preferred to name Scandinavians, probably mostly from what is now Sweden, plying the river routes between the Baltic and the Black and Caspian Seas.

Due largely to geographic considerations, it is often argued that most of the Varangians who traveled and settled in the lands of eastern Baltic, modern Russia and lands to the south came from the area of modern Sweden.

The Varangians left rune stones in their native Sweden that tell of their journeys to what is today Russia, Ukraine, Greece, and Belarus. Most of these rune stones can be seen today, and are a telling piece of historical evidence. The Varangian runestones tell of many notable Varangian expeditions, and even account for the fates of individual warriors and travelers.

== Islamic world ==
The Rus' initially appeared in Serkland in the 9th century, traveling as merchants along the Volga trade route, selling furs, honey, and slaves, as well as luxury goods such as amber, Frankish swords, and walrus ivory. These goods were mostly exchanged for Arabic silver coins, called dirhams. Hoards of 9th-century Baghdad-minted silver coins have been found in Sweden, particularly in Gotland. Variations in the size of the coin hoards show that there were phases of increased importation of coins and sometime decades during which very few coins were imported.

The economic relationship between the Rus and the Islamic world developed quickly into a network of trading routes. Initially the Rus founded Staraya Ladoga as the first node from the Baltic to the Caspian Sea and Black Sea. By the end of the 9th century, Staraya Ladoga was replaced as the most important center by Novgorod. From these centers the Rus were able to send their goods as far as Baghdad. Baghdad was the political and cultural center of the Islamic world in the 9th and 10th centuries and the Rus merchants who went there to trade their goods for silver interacted with cultures and goods from the Islamic World, and also from China, India, and North Africa.

The trade between the Rus and the lands south of the Black and Caspian seas made it possible for cultural interactions to take place between the Rus and the Islamic World. The account written by Ahmad ibn Fadlan about his 921–922 travels from Baghdad to Bulghar gives details which can reveal the cultural interaction between the two groups. Ibn Fadlan gives a vivid description of the Rus and their daily habits.

"I saw the Rūs, who had come for trade and had camped by the river Itil. I have never seen bodies more perfect than theirs. They were like palm trees. They are fair and ruddy. They wear neither coats [qurtāq] nor caftans, but a garment which covers one side of the body and leaves one hand free. Each of them carries an axe, a sword and a knife and is never parted from any of the arms we have mentioned. Their swords are broad bladed and grooved like the Frankish ones. From the tips of his toes to his neck, each man is tattooed in dark green with designs, and so forth. All their women wear on their bosoms a circular brooch made of iron, silver, copper or gold, depending on their husband’s wealth and social position. Each brooch has a ring in which is a knife, also attached to the bosom."

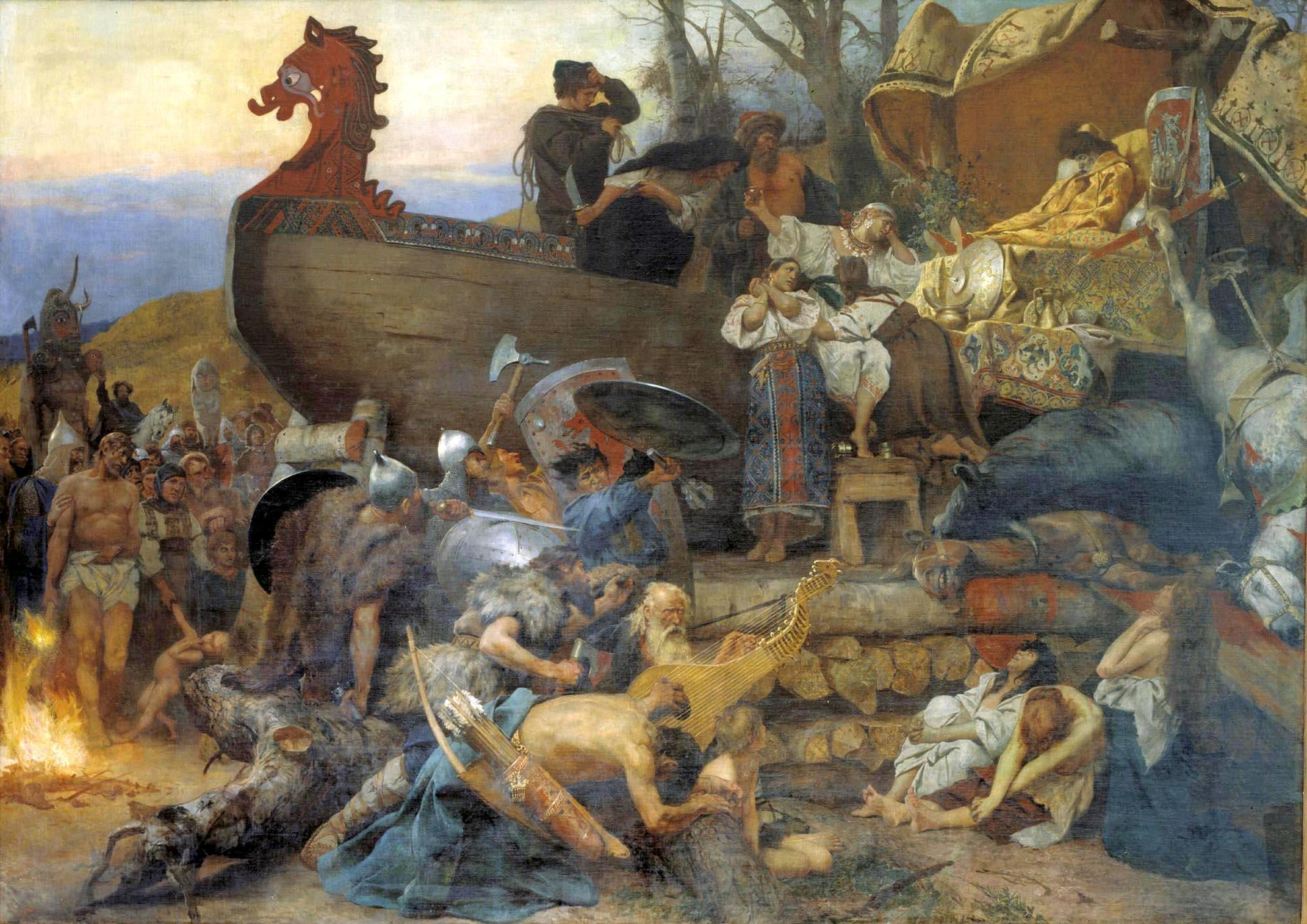
Ship burial of a Rus chieftain as described by the Arab traveler Ahmad ibn Fadlan who visited Kievan Rus in the 10th century, painted by Henryk Siemiradzki (1883).

He wrote the only known first-person account of the complicated ship-burning funeral ceremony. Certain details in his account, especially the dialogue of the ceremonies and his personal conversations with Rus individuals, show that the Rus and the Muslims were interested in and fairly knowledgeable about each other's cultures.

The geography of the Volga region and the relative lack of physical wealth available for stealing (compared to targets of Viking raids in the west) made raiding a less important aspect of the Rus/Varangian activities in the East. Some raiding was necessary to gain initial control of the towns and regions that they developed into centers of economic activities. The first small-scale raids took place in the late 9th and early 10th centuries. The Rus' undertook the first large-scale expedition in 913; having arrived on 500 ships, they pillaged Gorgan, in the territory of present-day Iran, and the adjacent areas, taking slaves and goods. On their return, the northern raiders were attacked and defeated by Khazar Muslims in the Volga Delta, and those who escaped were killed by the local tribes on the middle Volga.

During their next expedition in 943, the Rus' captured Barda, the capital of Arran, in the modern-day Republic of Azerbaijan. The Rus' stayed there for several months, killing many inhabitants of the city and amassing substantial plunder. It was only an outbreak of dysentery among the Rus' that forced them to depart with their spoils. Sviatoslav, prince of Kiev, commanded the next attack, which destroyed the Khazar state in 965. Sviatoslav's campaign established Rus' control over the north–south trade routes, helping to alter the demographics of the region. Raids continued through the time period with the last Scandinavian attempt to reestablish the route to the Caspian Sea led by Ingvar the Far-Travelled in 1041. While there, Varangians took part in the Georgian-Byzantine Battle of Sasireti in Georgia (1042).

== Byzantine Empire ==
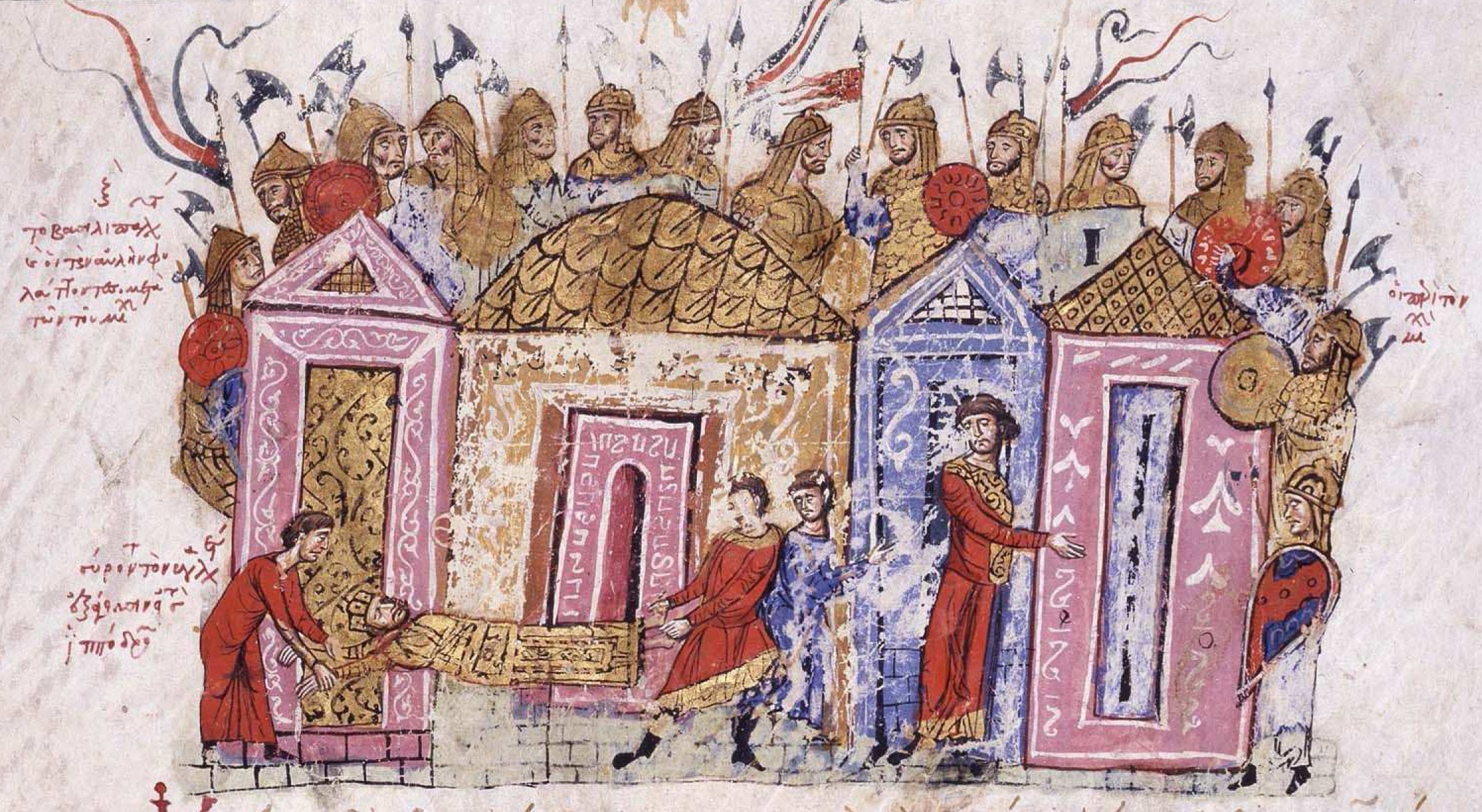
Varangian Guardsmen, an illumination from the 11th-century chronicle of John Skylitzes

The earliest Byzantine record of the Rus' may have been written prior to 842. It is preserved in the Greek Life of St. George of Amastris, which speaks of a raid that had extended into Paphlagonia. Contemporary Byzantine presence of the Rus' is mentioned in the Frankish Annals of St. Bertin. These relate that a delegation from the court of the Byzantine emperor visited Frankish Emperor Louis the Pious at his court in Ingelheim in 839. In this delegation were two men who called themselves Rhos (Rhos vocari dicebant). Louis enquired about their origins and learnt that they were Swedes. Fearing that they were spies for their brothers, the Danes, he incarcerated them.

In 860, the Rus' under Askold and Dir launched their first attack on Constantinople from Kiev. The result of this attack is disputed, but the Varangians continued their efforts as they regularly sailed on their monoxyla down the Dnieper into the Black Sea. The Rus' raids into the Caspian Sea were recorded by Muslim authors in the 870s and in 910, 912, 913, 943, and later. Although the Rus' had predominantly peaceful trading relations with the Byzantines, the rulers of Kiev launched the relatively successful naval expedition of 907 and the abortive campaign of 941 against Constantinople, as well as the large-scale invasion of the Balkans by Sviatoslav I in 968–971.

In 1043, Yaroslav sent his son Vladimir to attack Constantinople. The Byzantines destroyed the attacking vessels and defeated Vladimir

These raids were successful in forcing the Byzantines to re-arrange their trading arrangements; militarily, the Varangians were usually defeated by the superior Byzantine forces, especially in the sea due to Byzantine use of Greek fire.

=== Varangian Guard ===
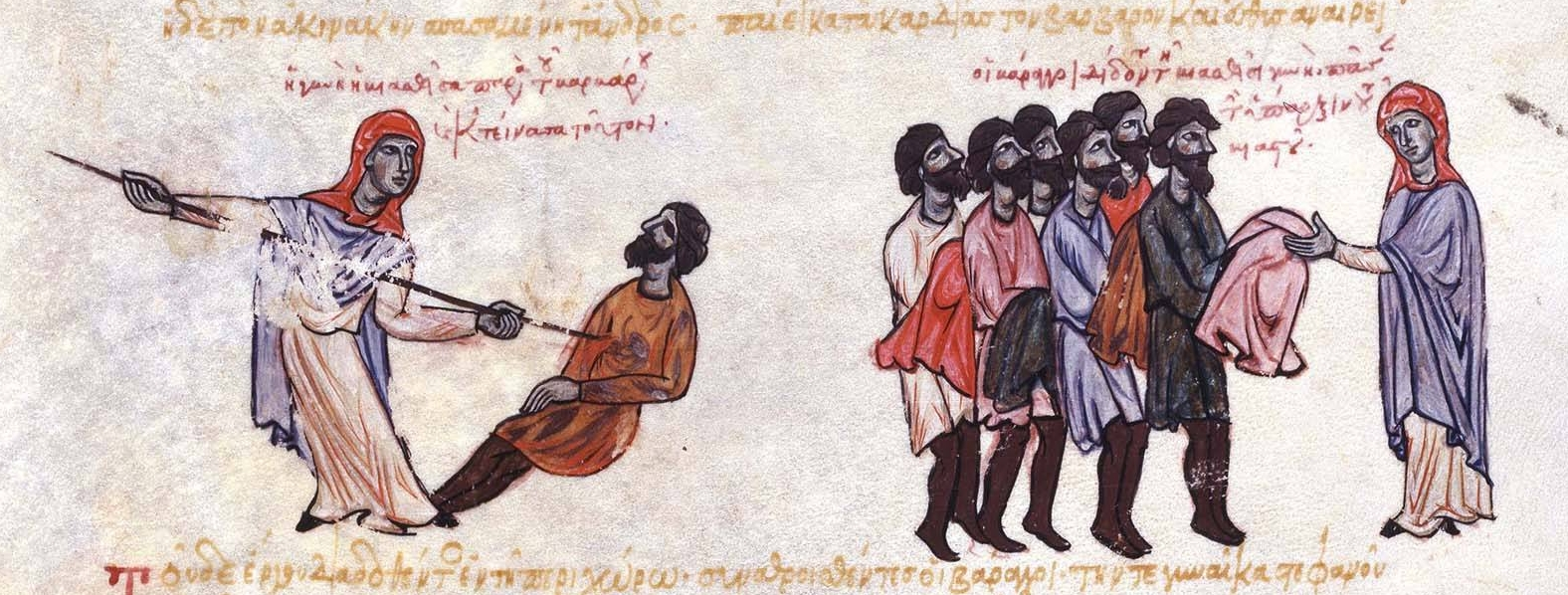
Another illumination of a scene from the Skylitzes Chronicle, depicting a Thracesian woman killing a Varangian who tried to rape her, whereupon his comrades praised her and gave her his possessions.

The Varangian Guard (Greek: Τάγμα των Βαράγγων, Tágma tōn Varángōn) were a part of Byzantine Army and personal bodyguards of the Byzantine emperors from the 10th to the 14th centuries. Initially the guard was composed of Varangians who came from Kievan Rus'.

Immigrants from Scandinavia (predominantly immigrants from Sweden but also elements from Denmark and Norway) kept an almost entirely Norse cast to the organization until the late 11th century. According to the late Swedish historian Alf Henrikson in his book Svensk Historia (History of Sweden), the Norse Varangian guardsmen were recognised by long hair, a red ruby set in the left ear and ornamented dragons sewn on their chainmail shirts.

In these years, Swedish men left to enlist in the Byzantine Varangian Guard in such numbers that a medieval Swedish law, Västgötalagen, from Västergötland declared no one could inherit while staying in "Greece"—the then Scandinavian term for the Byzantine Empire—to stop the emigration, especially as two other European courts simultaneously also recruited Scandinavians: Kievan Rus' c. 980–1060 and London 1018–1066 (the Þingalið).

Composed primarily of Scandinavians for the first hundred years, the guard increasingly included Anglo-Saxons after the successful Norman Conquest of England. By the time of Emperor Alexios Komnenos in the late 11th century, the Varangian Guard was largely recruited from Anglo-Saxons and "others who had suffered at the hands of the Vikings and their cousins the Normans". The Anglo-Saxons and other Germanic peoples shared with the Vikings a tradition of faithful, oath-bound service (to death if necessary), and after the Norman Conquest of England there were many fighting men, who had lost their lands and former masters, looking for a living elsewhere.

The Varangian Guard not only provided security for Byzantine emperors but participated in many wars involving Byzantium and often played a crucial role, since it was usually employed at critical moments of battle. By the late 13th century, Varangians were mostly ethnically assimilated by Byzantines, though the guard operated until at least the mid-14th century, and in 1400 there were still some people identifying themselves as "Varangians" in Constantinople.

== In popular culture ==
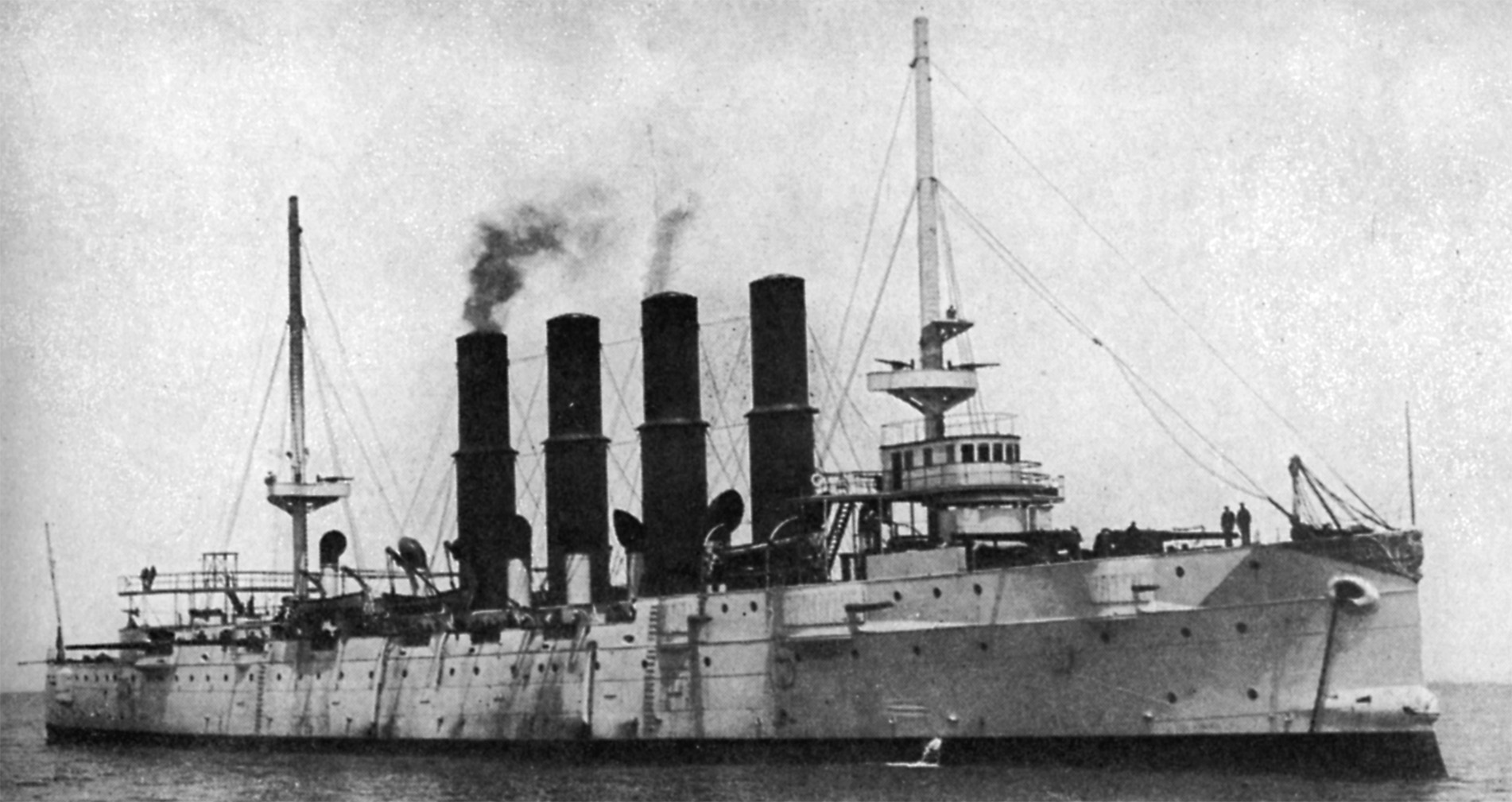
Russian cruiser Varyag (or Variag), 1908

- Varyag was a Russian protected cruiser which became famous in 1905 for her crew's stoicism at the Battle of Chemulpo Bay.
- Rosemary Sutcliff's 1976 historical novel Blood Feud depicts Basil II's formation of the Varangian Guard from the point of view of a half-Saxon orphan who journeyed to Constantinople via the Dnieper trade route.
- Henry Treece's Viking Trilogy recounts the adventures of Harald Sigurdson, including service in the Varangian Guard.
- Michael Ennis's Byzantium ISBN 978-0-330-31596-8, a fictionalized version of the life of Harald Hardrada, features time in the Varangian Guard.
- Also Poul Anderson's The Last Viking, another version of Harald Hardrada's life, features his time in the Varangian Guard and his tragic love for a Greek woman of Constantinople.
- Swedish writer Frans G. Bengtsson's Viking saga The Long Ships (or Red Orm) includes a section in which the main character's brother serves in the Varangians and gets involved in Byzantine court intrigues, with highly unpleasant results.
- In The Bulpington of Blup (1933) by H. G. Wells, the father of the protagonist maintains for years the fiction that he is at work on "a History of the Varangians that was to outshine Doughty".
- The John Ringo Paladin of Shadows series features a fictional, long-forgotten enclave of the Varangian Guard in the mountains of Georgia.
- Turisas' second studio album The Varangian Way is a concept album that tells the story of a group of Scandinavians traveling the river routes of medieval Russia, through Ladoga, Novgorod and Kiev to the Byzantine Empire. Their third album, Stand Up and Fight, describes the history of the Varangian Guard's service to the Byzantine Empire.
- Bearded axe-wielding Easterlings known as "Variags" appear in Tolkien's fantasy novel The Return of the King.
- In the PC game series Mount & Blade, the name and location of the Vaegirs echos the Varangians. Their faction have a unique unit called a "Vaegir Guard".
- In the video games Medieval: Total War and Medieval II: Total War the Varangian Guard is an axe-wielding elite infantry unit of the Byzantine Empire.
- Track 5 of Amon Amarth's seventh studio album Twilight of the Thunder God has the title "Varyags of Miklagaard".
- Track 2 of Grand Magus's eight studio album Sword Songs is titled "Varangian".
- Varangian soldiers are a common enemy in the video game Assassin's Creed: Revelations.
- A class of units in the multiplayer mode of the video game Mount & Blade II: Bannerlord belonging to the Rus inspired Sturgian faction, is called 'Varyag'.
- Russian writer Dmitry Bykov's novel Living Souls (ЖД) involved a civil war between Varangians and Khazars over the control of Russia.

== See also ==
- 1st SS Special Regiment Waräger
- Byzantine army
- Byzantine bureaucracy and aristocracy
- Christianization of Kievan Rus'
- Komnenian army
- Kylfings
- Oeselians
- Piraeus Lion (inscription made by Varangians)
- Rulers of Kievan Rus'
- Principality of Polotsk
- Principality of Turov
