= Fields of Gold (disambiguation) =

"Fields of Gold" is a 1993 song by Sting.

Fields of Gold may also refer to:

- Fields of Gold (novelette), a 2011 story by Rachel Swirsky
- Fields of Gold: The Best of Sting 1984–1994, a compilation album by Sting.
- Fields of Gold, a 1999 album by Terell Stafford
- "Fields of Gold", a song by Finnish folk metal band Turisas in their album The Varangian Way (2007)
  - Turisas sings a live version on the documentary A Finnish Summer with Turisas (2008)
- "Fields of Gold", a song by Daughter of Swords in her album Dawnbreaker (2019)
- Fields of Gold, a book by Andy Stanley
- Fields of Gold, a 2010 novel by Fiona McIntosh

== See also ==
- Gold fields (disambiguation)
