= Route from the Varangians to the Greeks =

Medieval trade route between Scandinavia and the Eastern Roman Empire

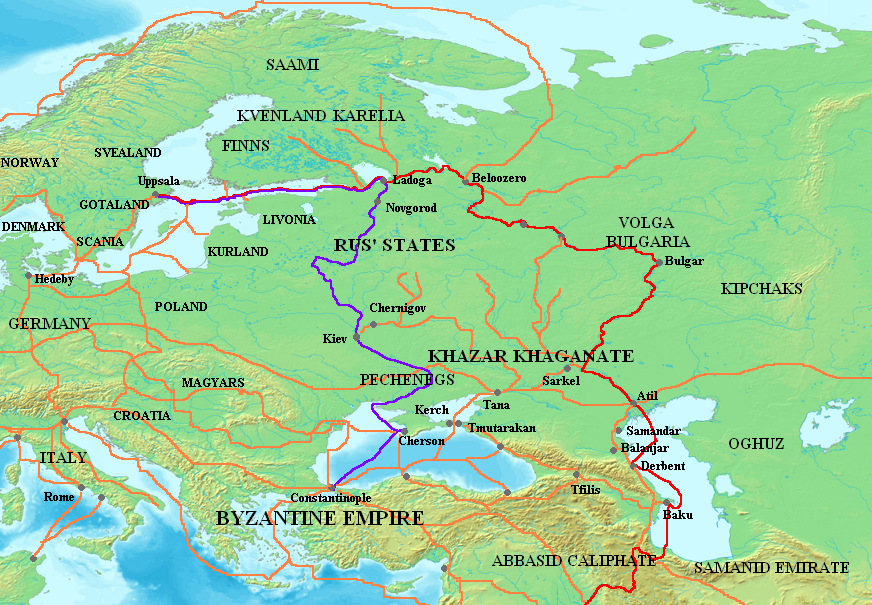
Map showing the major Varangian trade routes: the Volga trade route (in red) and the trade route from the Varangians to the Greeks (in purple). Other trade routes of the 8th to the 11th centuries are shown in orange.

The trade route from the Varangians to the Greeks was a medieval trade route that connected Scandinavia, Kievan Rus' and the Eastern Roman Empire. The route allowed merchants along its length to establish a direct prosperous trade with the Empire, and prompted some of them to settle in the territories of present-day Belarus, Russia and Ukraine. The majority of the route comprised a long-distance waterway, including the Baltic Sea, several rivers flowing into the Baltic Sea, and rivers of the Dnieper river system, with portages on the drainage divides. An alternative route was along the Dniester river with stops on the western shore of Black Sea. These more specific sub-routes are sometimes referred to as the Dnieper trade route and Dniester trade route, respectively.

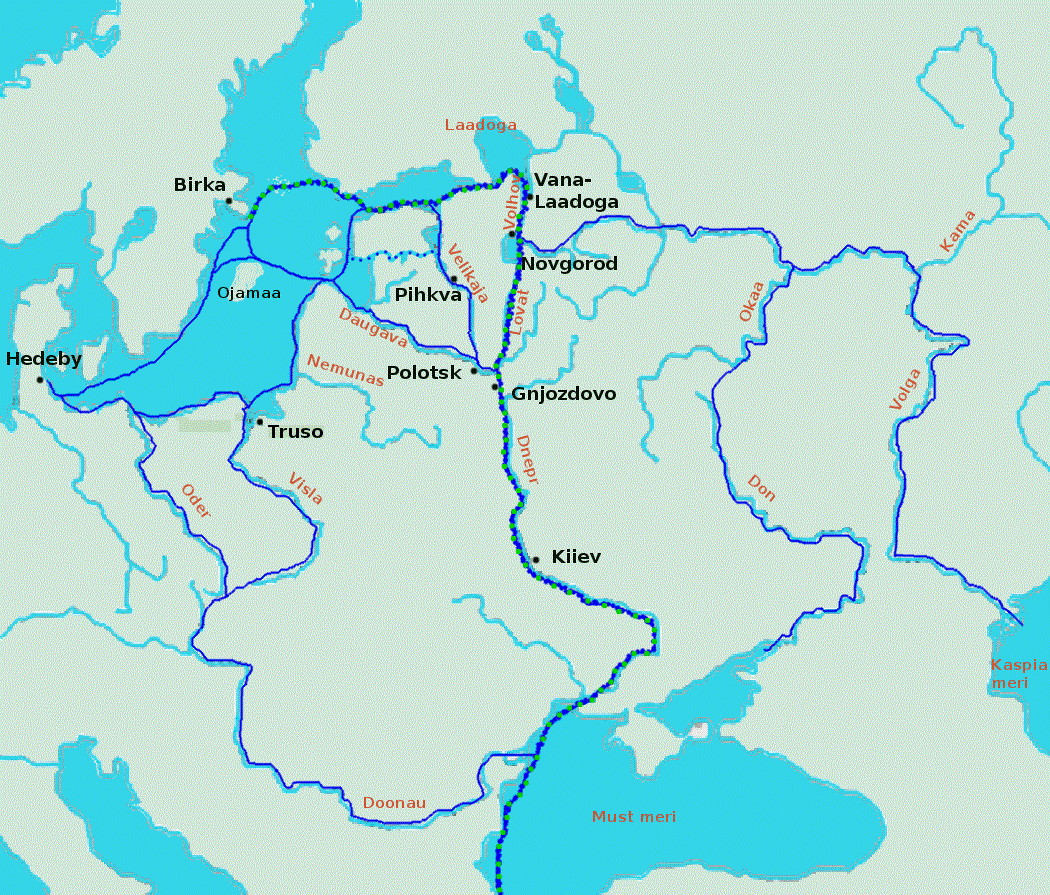
The trade route from the Varangians to the Greeks, according to Marika Mägi (In Austrvegr: The Role of the Eastern Baltic in Viking Age Communication across the Baltic Sea, 2018)

The route began in Scandinavian trading centers such as Birka, Hedeby, and Gotland, the eastern route crossed the Baltic Sea, entered the Gulf of Finland, and followed the Neva River into Lake Ladoga. Then it followed the Volkhov River upstream past the towns of Staraya Ladoga and Novgorod (where it met the Volga trade route and which became a major trade centre), crossed Lake Ilmen, and continued up the Lovat River, the Kunya River and possibly the Serezha River. From there, a portage led to the Toropa River and downstream to the Western Dvina River. From the Western Dvina, the ships went upstream along the Kasplya River and were portaged again to the Katynka River (near Katyn), a tributary of the Dnieper. It seems probable that once the route was established, the goods were unloaded onto land transport to cross the portage and reloaded onto other waiting ships on the Dnieper. Along the Dnieper, the route crossed several major rapids and passed through Kiev. After entering the Black Sea, it followed its west coast to Constantinople.

== History ==
The route from the Varangians to the Greeks was first mentioned in the early 12th-century Primary Chronicle (on page 7, line 2), although it does not describe it in detail.

| Line | Primary Chronicle Ostrowski et al. (2014) [2003] | English translation Inés García de la Puente (2010) |
|---|---|---|
| 7.1 | Поляномъ же живъшимъ особь по горамъ | When the Polianians lived by themselves among the hills, |
| 7.2 | симъ, и бѣ путь из Варягъ въ Грьки и из | and there was a route from the Varangians to the Greeks and from |
| 7.3 | Грькъ по Дънѣпру, и вьрхъ Дънѣпра волокъ до | the Greeks along the Dnepr, and above the Dnepr a portage to |
| 7.4 | Ловоти, и по Ловоти вънити въ Илмерь озеро | the Lovat, and along the Lovat one enters the great lake |
| 7.5 | великое, из негоже озера потечеть Вълховъ, и | Ilmen, from this lake flows the Volkhov, |
| 7.6 | вътечеть въ озеро великое Нево, и того | and it flows into the great lake Nevo [Ladoga], and from this lake |
| 7.7 | озера вънидеть устие въ море Варяжьское. И по | the outfall flows into the Varangian Sea [Baltic Sea], and along |
| 7.8 | тому морю вънити доже и до Рима, а отъ Рима прити по | this sea one arrives at Rome, and from Rome one arrives along |
| 7.9 | томуже морю къ Цьсарюграду, и отъ Цьсаряграда | the same sea at Tsargrad [Constantinople], and from Tsargrad |
| 7.10 | прити въ Понтъ море, въ неже вътечеть Дънѣпръ | one enters the Pontic Sea [Black Sea], into which the river Dnepr |
| 7.11 | рѣка. | flows. |

But its effects were reported much earlier, in the ninth chapter of Byzantine emperor Constantine VII Porphyrogenitus's book De Administrando Imperio, who noted that the Rhos came down the river Dnieper from Novgorod, Smolensk, Liubech, Chernigov, Vyshgorod, gathering in Kiev before sailing further down the Dnieper towards the Black Sea in June. Though "Varangians" has come to mean "Vikings" to many, the term for the Byzantines meant all Scandinavians and their kindred living in what are now Belarus, Russia, and Ukraine.

The route was probably established in the late 8th and early 9th centuries, when Varangian explorers searched for plunder but also for slaves and lucrative goods. The route gained significant importance from the 10th until the first third of the 11th century, concurrently with the Volga trade route and the trade route from the Khazars to the Germans.

According to Constantine VII, the Krivichs and other tribes dependent on Kiev transported hollowed-out sailboats, or monoxyla, which could accommodate thirty to forty people, to places along the rivers. These sailboats were then transported along the Dnieper to Kiev. There they were sold to the Varangians who re-equipped them and loaded them with merchandise.

== Routes and places ==
Places named include Smolensk (Μιλινισκα), Liubech (Τελιουτζα), Chernihiv (Τζερνιγωγα), Vyshhorod (Βουσεγραδε), Vitichev (Βιτετζεβη), and Kiev (Κια[ο]βα). Some of these cities had alternate names in Old Norse, and Constantine quotes some of them: So Novgorod (Νεμογαρδα) is the same as Hólmgarðr (‘Island Enclosure’) and Nýgarðr (‘New Enclosure’); Kiev is equally called Kœnugarðr (‘Boatyard’) or Σαμβατας, which might derive from Norse Sandbakki-áss (‘Sandbank Ridge’). Though Constantin Zuckerman suggests a more obvious etymology, from the Turkic (Khazar) roots sam and bat (literally, ‘upper fortress’). The runestone N 62 preserves the name Vitaholmr (‘demarcation islet’), which could refer to Vitichev, according to Boris Kleiber. Judith Jesch, however, suggests Vitaholmr may refer either to Witland, a historical region on the east side of the River Vistula, or to Vindau on the coast of Courland.

=== Dnieper route ===
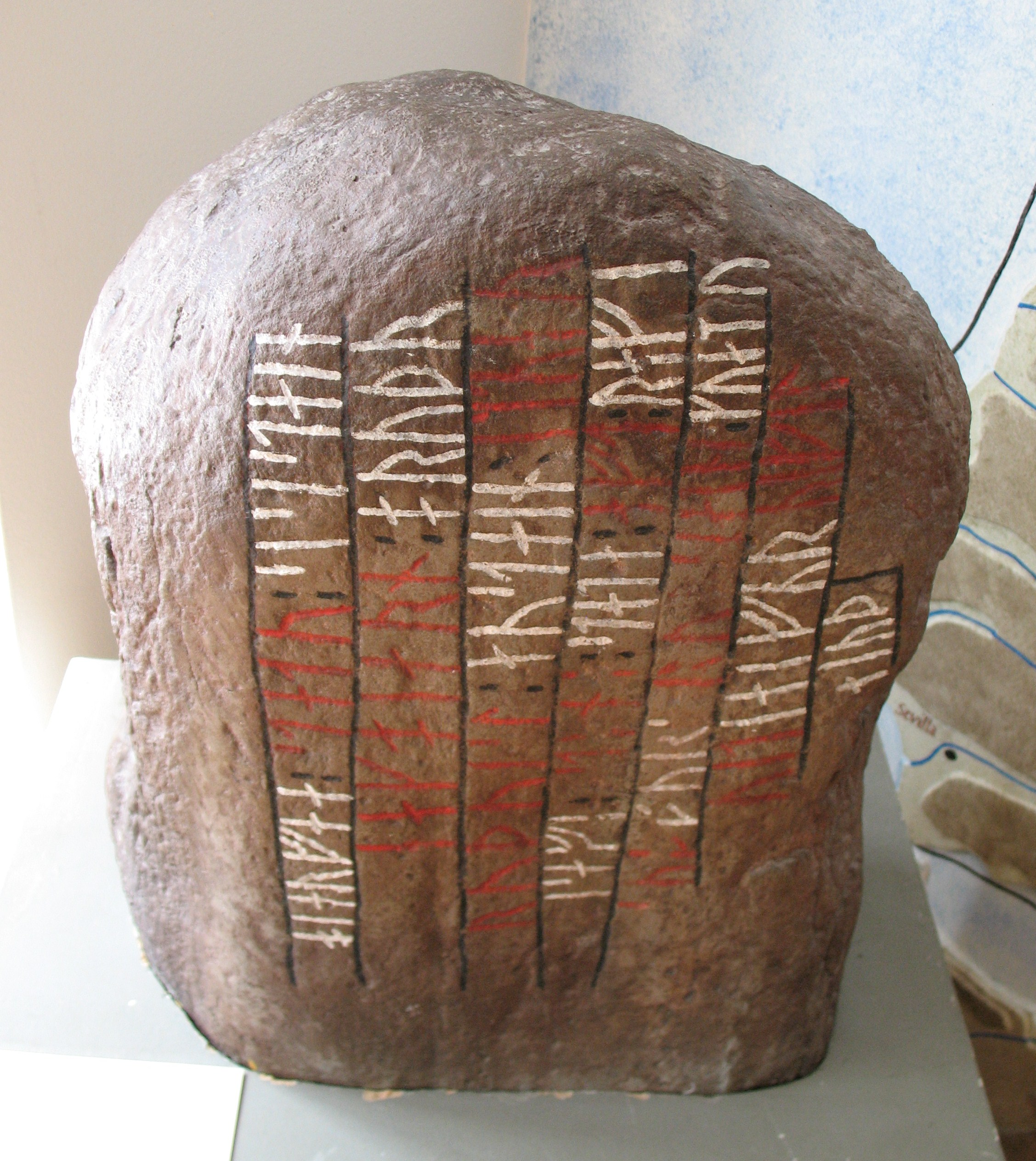
A coloured copy of runestone G 280 which talks of death in the Dnieper Rapids.

On the Dnieper, the Varangians had to portage their ships around seven rapids, where they had to be on guard from Pecheneg nomads. The rapids began below the modern city of Dnipro, where the river turns south, and fell 50 meters in 66 kilometers. Today, the rapids are underwater, due to the construction of the dam of DniproHES, a hydroelectric power station, in 1932.

Below the rapids, they had to pass a narrow rocky spot called the Ford of Vrar (Russian: Krariyskaya crossing), where the Varangians were often attacked by the Pechenegs. The Varangians stopped at St. George Island. Then they equipped their ships with sails in the Dnieper estuary and continued to navigate along the western shore of the Black Sea all the way to Constantinople (Slavic: Tsargrad, Old Norse: Miklagarðr).

An alternative route named Zalozny avoided the Dnieper rapids altogether, instead passing through rivers Samara, Vovcha, and Kalmius into the Sea of Azov. The route then stopped at Tmutarakan before continuing along the Black Sea coast to Constantinople.

=== Western Black Sea shores ===
The Varangian boats were used along the rivers and along the Black Sea shores. According to Constantine VII, the navigation near the western shore of Black Sea contained stops at Sulina (Danube Delta), Conopa, Constantia (localities today in Romania). There are some remains of the Varangian presence in this area at Murfatlar Cave Complex near Constantia (today Constanţa, Romania). Numerous runic inscriptions, symbols and even a graffiti of a Viking navy are visible on the walls of the rock church from Murfatlar. A rune stone from the Sjonhem cemetery in Gotland dating from the 11th century commemorates a merchant Rodfos who was traveling to Constantinople and was killed north of the Danube by the Blakumenn (Vlachs).

== Trade activities ==
The Trade Route from the Varangians to the Greeks was connected to other waterways of Eastern Europe, such as the Pripyat-Bug waterway leading to Western Europe, and the Volga trade route, which went down the Volga waterway to the Caspian Sea. Another offshoot was along the Dnieper and the Usyazh-Buk River towards Lukoml and Polotsk.

The Trade Route from the Varangians to the Greeks was used to transport different kinds of merchandise. Wine, spices, jewelry, glass, expensive fabrics, icons, and books came from the Byzantine Empire. Volhyn traded spinning wheels and other items. Certain kinds of weapons and handicrafts came from Scandinavia. Northern Rus' offered timber, fur, honey, and wax, while the Baltic tribes traded amber.

In the second half of the eleventh century, the Crusades opened more lucrative routes from Europe to the Orient through the Crusader states of the Middle East. By that time, Rus' had strengthened its commercial ties with Western Europe, and the route from the Varangians to the Greeks gradually lost its significance. For a related military route, see Muravsky Trail.

== In popular culture ==
"Holmgard and beyond
That's where the winds will us guide
For fame and for gold
Set sail for those lands unknown"

— Turisas, "To Holmgard and Beyond", The Varangian Way (2007)
- A large part of the best-selling Swedish historical novel The Long Ships (original Swedish Röde Orm) by Frans Gunnar Bengtsson describes the adventures of a Swedish ship crew (with a pilot from Gotland) taking this route in the late 10th century.
- Rosemary Sutcliff's 1976 novel Blood Feud takes place during the 10th-century, and depicts a half-Saxon orphan who joins a Viking crew and takes this route, joining the Varangian Guard and ultimately settling in Constantinople.
- The second book of Henry Treece's Viking Trilogy, The Road to Miklagard, published in the late 1950s describes a Viking voyage through the Mediterranean to Constantinople, where the main characters are taken as slaves and later become members of the Varangian Guards. They eventually make their way back to their home village via the trade route.
- In Stephen R. Lawhead's novel Byzantium, the main character, a 9th-century Irish monk, is taken by Viking raiders from Scandia to Constantinople via this route.
- In the comic strip Prince Valiant, pages 932 (19 Dec 1954) to 988 (15 Jan 1956), the eponymous main character and company travel on two Viking longships from Constantinople to Scandia via this route, during which they encounter Patzinaks and Polotjans.
- Two music albums coincidentally released in 2007 deal with fictional journeys down the trade route, heavy metal band Rebellion's Miklagard — The History of the Vikings Volume 2 and Finnish folk metal band Turisas' The Varangian Way. Turisas' songs feature Scandinavian names (Jarisleif in "In the Court of Jarisleif" for Grand Prince Yaroslav) and Old Norse exonyms for toponyms (such as Holmgard in "To Holmgard and Beyond" for Veliky Novgorod, and Miklagard in "Miklagard Overture" for Constantinople) connected to Kievan Rus'. According to Bosselmann (2018) and DiGioia (2020), Scandinavian names are used by Turisas 'as a way to convey the historical context of the songs' subject matter', namely 'the stories of the Scandinavian pre-Christian populations and their travels eastwards along the way known as the Way of the Varangians to the Greek to Constantinople'.
- Michael Crichton's fictional work Eaters of the Dead uses the framework of this trade route, in the book's first portion, to explicate a journey from the Middle East all the way to Scandinavia. This book was the basis for the film The 13th Warrior.

== See also ==
- Byzantine economy
- Black Sea slave trade
- Economy of Kievan Rus'
- Samanid slave trade
- Caspian expeditions of the Rus
- Rus' Khaganate
- Greece runestones
