= Stand Up and Fight =

Stand Up and Fight may refer to:

- Stand Up and Fight, a 1921 film directed by Edward Laemmle
- Stand Up and Fight (film), a 1939 film directed by W. S. Van Dyke
- Stand Up and Fight, a 1980 album by Quartz
- Stand Up and Fight (album), a 2011 album by Turisas
- Stan' Up and Fight, a translation of Bizet's Toreador Song
