= Turisas2013 =

Studio album by Turisas
- Released: 21 August 2013
- Recorded: November 2012 – May 2013
- Genre: Symphonic metal; folk metal; power metal
- Label: Century Media
- Producer: Mathias Nygård

Turisas chronology
Stand Up and Fight (2011)	Turisas2013 (2013)

Singles from Turisas2013
- 1. "For Your Own Good" Released: 2013

Turisas2013 is the fourth studio album by Finnish folk metal band Turisas. It was published on 21 August in Finland and 26 August in Europe, while the UK followed on 2 September and North America on 3 September.

The album was produced by vocalist Mathias Nygård and the majority of the album recorded by Nygård and guitarist Jussi Wickström in a remote house outside of Helsinki that served as the Turisas2013 command centre and headquarters. Additional recordings were conducted in two other studios: the drums at Atomic Spa Studio and orchestral recordings at 5 by 5 Studio, both in Helsinki. Many of the vocals and numerous additional elements were tracked at Sound Supreme Studio in Hämeenlinna where Turisas also recorded The Varangian Way and Stand Up and Fight.

== Track listing ==
All tracks are written by Mathias Nygård, except where noted

No.	Title	Music	Length
1.	"For Your Own Good"	Mathias Nygård, Jussi Wickström	4:34
2.	"Ten More Miles"		4:16
3.	"Piece by Piece"		5:37
4.	"Into the Free"		3:50
5.	"Run Bhang-Eater, Run!"		4:43
6.	"Greek Fire"	Mathias Nygård, Jussi Wickström	5:00
7.	"The Days Passed"	Mathias Nygård, Olli Vänskä	4:33
8.	"No Good Story Ever Starts With Drinking Tea"	Mathias Nygård, Olli Vänskä	2:51
9.	"We Ride Together"	Mathias Nygård, Jussi Wickström	6:33
