= Caitlin De Ville =

Zambian violinist based in Cape Town

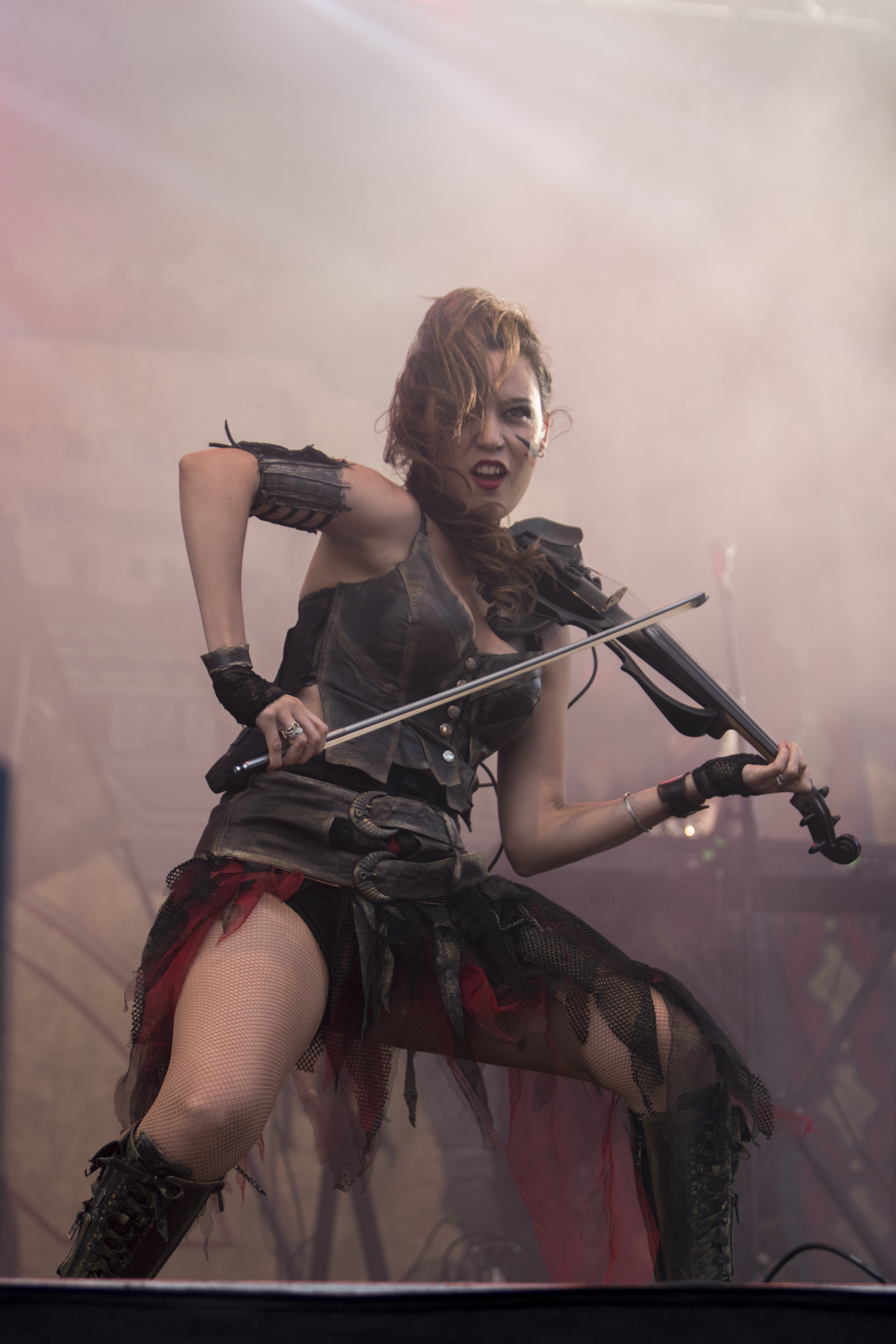
- De Ville performing in Finland in 2019

Background information
- Born: 9 March 1989 (age 37); Chingola, Zambia
- Origin: Cape Town, South Africa
- Genres: Electronic rock; pop rock; symphonic metal
- Occupation: Musician
- Instruments: Electric violin; violin
- Years active: 2009–present
- Labels: Ostereo; Casa De Ville
- Website: caitdeville.com

YouTube information
- Channel: Caitlin De Ville
- Years active: 2009–present
- Genre: Music
- Subscribers: 754 thousand
- Views: 282 million
- Last updated: 4 August 2026

Caitlin De Ville (born 9 March 1989) is a Zambian electric violinist based in Cape Town, South Africa. She released her debut album Serengeti Sunrise in 2017. A popular touring musician, De Ville has toured as a solo artist and with bands like Turisas.

== Biography ==
De Ville was born in the city of Chingola in the Zambian copperbelt and raised in the nearby city of Kitwe. She moved to Cape Town at age eighteen.

De Ville started uploading videos to YouTube in 2009, and her violin covers of popular songs gained online popularity during the 2010s. By 2018 her channel was one of the top ten YouTube channels in South Africa. As of July 2022, she has more than 235 million views on her YouTube videos and remains one of the most subscribed to creators in South Africa.

In 2019, she toured with the Finnish metal band Turisas.

== Discography ==
=== Albums ===
List of albums, with selected details
Title	Details
Serengeti Sunrise	Released: 2 June 2017; Label: Ostereo; Formats: digital
Covers Collection	Released: 12 April 2019; Label: Ostereo; Formats: digital (double album); Compilation album
Primal Donna	Released: 24 September 2021; Label: Ostereo; Formats: digital

=== Singles ===
List of singles, showing year released and album name
Title	Year	Album
"Isis"	2017	Serengeti Sunrise
"Crowe"	2017	Serengeti Sunrise
"Black Jack"	2017	Serengeti Sunrise
"Ricochet"	2019	Primal Donna
"Untamed"	2020	Primal Donna
"Conquest"	2021	Primal Donna
"Fire & Wine"	2021	Primal Donna
"Kalumbila"	2021	Primal Donna
"Vermilion Dawn"	2021	Primal Donna
"Back from the Beyond"	2021	Primal Donna
"Izmira"	2021	Primal Donna
"Stregheria"	2022	
"Stregheria - Alternate Version"	2022	
"Land of Freedom"	2022	
"Pentacles"	2022	
"My Dark Valentine II"	2023	
"TRUSTFALL"	2023	
"Nowhere Bound"	2023	
"Tattoo"	2024	
