= Vinland the Good =

Title used for two works of fiction

- First US edition
- Author: Nevil Shute
- Language: English
- Genre: Adventure
- Publisher: Heinemann (UK); Morrow (US)
- Publication date: 1946
- Publication place: England
- Pages: 127 pp
- ISBN: 1-889439-11-8

Vinland the Good is a description of Vinland which appears in the two sagas, Greenlanders' Saga and Saga of Erik the Red. The term has been used as the title of two works of fiction by British authors.

- Vinland the Good was used as the title of a film script by British author Nevil Shute telling the historical story of the discovery of America by Leif Ericson. The book was originally published in 1946 in England by Heinemann and in America by Morrow, and re-published in America in 1998 by The Paper Tiger (ISBN 1-8894-39-11-8). In his preface to the script, Shute says “I put a very little of [the story] into a novel which was published in 1939” – this was An Old Captivity, actually first published in 1940.
- Vinland the Good is also the title of a 1967 juvenile historical novel by Henry Treece, and illustrated by William Stobbs. It is an account of Viking Age explorations, based mainly on the Greenland saga. Leif Ericson is the main character, but several of his relatives are also important characters.
