= J. F. Hendry =

Scottish poet, writer and editor

James Findlay Hendry (12 September 1912 – 17 December 1986) was a Scottish poet known also as an editor and writer. He was born in Glasgow, and read Modern Languages at the University of Glasgow. During World War II he served in the Royal Artillery and the Intelligence Corps. After the war he worked as a translator for international organizations, including the UN and the ILO. He later took a chair at Laurentian University. He died in Toronto.

He edited with Henry Treece the poetry anthology The New Apocalypse (1939) which gave its name to the New Apocalyptics poetic group. The long poem Marimarusa was published in 1978.

== Other works ==
- The White Horseman (1941) poetry anthology with Henry Treece
- Bombed Happiness (1942);
- The Orchestral Mountain (1943)
- Scottish Short Stories (1943) (ed.)
- Crown and Sickle (1944) poetry anthology with Henry Treece
- The Blackbird of Ospo (1945) novel
- Fernie Brae (1947) novel
- Scottish Short Stories (1969) (ed.)
- Your Career as a Translator and Interpreter (1980)
- A World Alien (1980)
- The Sacred Threshold: a life of Rilke (1982)
- The Disinherited
