= Mysie =

- Born: Elizabeth Marjorie Florence Sempa; 1995 (age 30–31)
- Genres: Indie pop
- Instrument: Vocals
- Years active: 2013–present
- Labels: Ostereo; 70Hz Recordings; ONErpm

Elizabeth Marjorie Florence Sempa (born 1995), also known as Lizbet Sempa or Mysie, is an English singer-songwriter. She won the Rising Star Award at the 2020 Ivor Novello Awards.

== Early life ==
Elizabeth Marjorie Florence Sempa grew up in Croydon and Streatham, South London. Her grandfather was an Ugandan jazz musician and member of the group Kampala City Six. Sempa trained in Acting at the Academy of Live and Recorded Arts (ALRA), graduating with a Bachelor of Arts (BA) in 2017.

== Career ==
=== 2013–2016: Beginnings as Lizbet Sempa ===
Under the name Lizbet Sempa, she gained initial attention on SoundCloud in 2013 around the age of 17, self-releasing her first tracks "Epiphany", "Mistakes", and "On These Hills" and the EP Indirect Thoughts. This was followed by the singles "All These Things" in 2015 and "Deep Inside" in 2016.

=== 2019–2022: Branding to Mysie, Chapter 11, Undertones and joyride ===
Feeling "pigeonholed" into making a certain type of music, Sempa rebranded to Mysie, a nickname of her middle name Marjorie. She debuted the new moniker with the 2019 single "Rocking Chair" and the EP Chapter 11. Other singles released that year include "Fall Away", "Doves", "Sweet Relief" and "Heartbeat". That year, Sempa was selected for The Great Escape Festival's First Fifty. The singles "Gift", "Bones" and "Patterns" followed in 2020. In addition to being mentored by Fraser T Smith, Sempa was awarded Rising Star at the 2020 Ivor Novello Awards.

Sempa's next EP Undertones and the singles "Seven Nights" and "A Thousand Miles" were released in 2021. She made her Live at Leeds debut that October. Her fourth EP joyride was released in 2022, as well as the titular single, "birthstones", "fade" and "gin + juice". Sempa supported Corinne Bailey Rae on her 2022 tour and was once again selected for The Great Escape Festival's First Fifty.

=== 2023–present: Controlla ===
In 2023, Sempa began shifting her public image, experimenting with the singles "CTRL", "PLAY" and "Double Dutch". She also featured on "BLU" by Italian artist La Niña. Her debut mixtape Controlla (stylised uppercase) was released in 2024. The accompanying singles were "Little Too Late", "PHASES" and "Kitty on Top". She supported IAMDDB on her European tour.

== Artistry ==
Growing up, Sempa's parents played the likes of Sade and Alicia Keys in the household, while school and living in South Africa gave her an appreciation for indie artists Radiohead and The Killers and Afropop's Brenda Fassie respectively. Listening to the radio station Magic 105.4 in the car left a significant impression on Sempa as she discovered Duran Duran, 10cc and Lionel Richie. She joined a dance group called Wet Wipez as a teenager, through which she became familiar with J Dilla, Thundercat and Flying Lotus. Early in her career under the name Lizbet Sempa, she also recalled admiring the likes of Georgia Anne Muldrow and Hiatus Kaiyote in her youth. "Deep Inside" (2016) was compared to Adele and Laura Mvula. Regarding her debut EP Chapter 11 as Mysie, she drew upon Calvin Harris and Anderson Paak. She named Jay Kay from Jamiroquai one of her heroes.

Sempa cited Empire of the Sun, Tame Impala and Mac DeMarco as influences as well as Sampha, Moses Sumney, Disclosure and Rosalía. Other artists she has named include Cookiee Kawaii, Yaeji and Sasha Keable. Sempa fuses a wide range of genre influences in her music, including UK garage, Brixton's dance venues, house, Jersey club, baile funk, indie and electropop.

== Discography ==
=== Mixtapes ===
- CONTROLLA (2024)

=== EPs ===
- Indirect Thoughts (2013)
- Chapter 11 (2019)
- Undertones (2021)
- joyride (2022)

=== Singles ===
- "Epiphany" (2013)
- "Mistakes" (2013)
- "On These Hills" (2013)
- "All These Things" (2015)
- "Deep Inside" (2016)
- "Rocking Chair" (2019)
- "Fall Away" (2019)
- "Doves" (2019)
- "Sweet Relief" (2019)
- "Heartbeat" (2019)
- "Gift" (2020)
- "Bones" (2020)
- "Patterns" (2020)
- "Seven Nights" (2021)
- "A Thousand Miles" (2021)
- "joyride" (2022)
- "birthstones" (2022)
- "fade" (2022)
- "gin + juice" (2022)
- "CTRL" (2023)
- "BLU" (2023) (collaboration with LA NIÑA)
- "PLAY" (2023)
- "Double Dutch" (2023)
- "LITTLE TOO LATE" (2024)
- "PHASES" (2024)
- "KITTY ON TOP" (2024)

=== Collaborations ===
- "Deletia" (2021), with Fyfe and Iskra Strings
