= Battle Metal =

Studio album by Turisas
- Released: 26 July 2004
- Recorded: November 2003 – March 2004 at Sound Suite Studio (Marseille, France) and Steeltrack Studio (Parola, Finland)
- Genres: Folk metal, symphonic metal, Viking metal, power metal
- Length: 57:15
- Label: Century Media
- Producers: Terje Refsnes, Mathias Nygård

Turisas chronology
The Heart of Turisas (2001)	Battle Metal (2004)	The Varangian Way (2007)

Professional ratings
Review scores
Source	Rating
Chronicles of Chaos	8.5/10
Scream Magazine	5/6

Battle Metal is the debut studio album by the Finnish folk metal band Turisas. It was released on 26 July 2004 by Century Media.

== Background and production ==
Turisas was formed in 1997, but did not have a recording contract until November 2003, having been signed by Century Media. Thus, Battle Metal is a collection of songs written over a period of six years. The band began pre-production and recorded a demo in early 2003, after Mathias Nygård, the band's singer and songwriter had completed his one-year military service. Turisas had originally planned to enter a studio later that year, but decided to postpone upon learning that only three and a half weeks of recording time would be available to them. By autumn, Nygård was offered up to five weeks of recording time at the Sound Suite Studio in Marseille, France, with Terje Refsnes, a notable producer. Actual recording began in November at the Steeltrack Studio in Parola, Finland, with the violin parts by Olli Vänskä, followed by accordion by Riku Ylitalo. After Tude Lehtonen had completed the drum parts, the band left for France to continue recording through December.

The band had remained at the Sound Suite Studio for thirty days, but was unable to finish the recording, still missing the vocals, choirs, as well as some acoustic instruments and percussions and returned to Finland. Most of these was recorded at the Steeltrack Studio in January – February 2004, while Nygård went back to Marseille to complete the vocals; Battle Metal was finally finished on 31 March.

== Music ==
"Victoriae & triumphi dominus" ("Lord of Victiory and Triumph") is an instrumental intro, leading to the opening track, "As Torches Rise", meant to capture a battlefield's atmosphere of darkness and despair. "Battle Metal" is a remake of "The Heart of Turisas" from the eponymous 2001 demo with subdued growling. "The Land of Hope and Glory" delves into the themes of nostalgia and homecoming, combining folky sounds with a bombastic chorus. "The Messenger", one of the band's oldest songs, explores the topics of fate and religion. "One More" is based around a violin theme, which was first featured in the song "Terra Tavestorum", appearing on the 1999 demo of the same name. Set in a tavern, the song's mood is reminiscent of the absent friends. Its folky tunes are reminiscent of the Romani music and are complemented by a big, orchestrated chorus. "Midnight Sunrise", an older song as well, contrasts the myths of various evil creatures living in dark places, unable to handle sunlight, and coming out at night to prey with the phenomenon of the midnight sun. "Among Ancestors" is a choir-driven song, describing a battlefield on which the warring soldiers are missed by their loved ones. "Sahti-waari", which can be roughly translated as "Old Man Ale", is a homage to the traditional homebrewed beer from the Häme region of Finland. Vaari, the Finnish word for grandfather, is not about any particular character. Rather, it is a celebration of the old traditions and their recent reemergence in the form of neopaganism. The lyrics in "Prologue for R.R.R." are taken from the opening for the historical novel The Surgeon's Stories: Times of Gustaf Adolf by Zacharias Topelius, a Fennoswede author. "Rex regi rebellis" ("The King is Rebellious Towards the King" in Latin) is dedicated to the Thirty Years' War and the Finnish cavalry Hakkapeliitta, the topics that have fascinated Mathias Nygård since childhood. The title again comes from The Surgeon's Stories; the lyrics in Swedish are by Topelius as well, taken from "Finska rytteriets marsch i trettioåriga kriget". "Katuman kaiku" ("The Echoe of Lake Katuma") is an instrumental outro. Katumajärvi is a lake in the Häme region, which was targeted by the Second Swedish Crusade to subjugate and Christianise the local Pagan tribes. According to a legend, when the invaders left, the locals jumped into the lake to wash away their baptism and continued to practice the old beliefs and traditions for many years to come, with some surviving into the 19th century.

== Track listing ==
No.	Title	Writer(s)	Length
1.	"Victoriae & Triumphi Dominus" (Lord of Victory and Triumph)	Mathias Nygård	1:27
2.	"As Torches Rise"	Nygård	4:51
3.	"Battle Metal"	Nygård	4:23
4.	"The Land of Hope and Glory"	Nygård	6:22
5.	"The Messenger"	Nygård, Antti Ventola	4:42
6.	"One More"	Nygård	6:50
7.	"Midnight Sunrise"	Nygård	8:15
8.	"Among Ancestors"	Nygård, Ventola	5:16
9.	"Sahti-Waari" ("Old Man Ale ")	Nygård, Ventola	2:28
10.	"Prologue for R.R.R."	Nygård, Zacharias Topelius	3:09
11.	"Rex Regi Rebellis" (The King Is Rebellious Towards the King)	Nygård, Topelius, Jussi Wickström	7:10
12.	"Katuman Kaiku" ("The Echoe of Lake Katuma")	Nygård	2:22
13.	"Till the Last Man Falls" (Japanese edition bonus track)	Nygård	5:29
14.	"Terra Tavestorum" (Japanese edition bonus track)	Nygård	5:34
15.	"Midnight Sunrise (Live)" (Japanese edition bonus track)	Nygård	7:01

The 2009 reissue features the "Battle Metal 2008" music video, as well as two live tracks, "As Torches Rise" and "One More" recorded at Ruisrock and Wanaja festivals respectively in 2008.

== Personnel ==
- Mathias Nygård – vocals, alto, soprano and sopranino recorders, programming, additional percussions
- Jussi Wickström – electric and acoustic guitar, bass guitar, double bass
- Tude Lehtonen – drums/percussion (djembe, udu, congas, bongos, electric percussion)
- Antti Ventola – synthesizers, piano, vibraphone, Hammond organ
- Georg Laakso – electric and acoustic guitar

Additional musicians

- Riku Ylitalo – accordion
- Olli Vänskä –violin
- Emmanuelle Zoldan – female vocals

== Charts ==
Chart performance for Battle Metal
Chart (2022)	Peak position
Finnish Albums (Suomen virallinen lista)	20
