= J.Fla =

South Korean singer (born 1987)

- Born: Kim Jung-hwa; June 10, 1987 (age 39); Seoul, South Korea
- Occupations: singer; songwriter; YouTuber

YouTube information
- Channel: JFlaMusic
- Years active: 2011–present
- Subscribers: 17.2 million
- Views: 4.030 billion

Korean name
- Hangul: 김정화
- Hanja: 金貞華
- RR: Gim Jeonghwa
- MR: Kim Chŏnghwa
- Last updated: April 14, 2026
- Website: https://jflasong.com

Kim Jung-hwa (Korean: 김정화; born June 10, 1987), better known by her stage name J.Fla (제이플라), is a South Korean singer, songwriter, and YouTuber. She signed with Sony Music Japan, and later Ostereo Records, before founding her own label GOODSEN Entertainment in 2022.

== Music career ==
On August 22, 2011, J.Fla created her YouTube channel, JFlaMusic, and uploaded her first song, a cover of Beyoncé's "Halo". Over the next five months she uploaded 15 more cover songs.

Subsequently, on February 17, 2012, a collection of 8 tracks entitled "JFla's Cover 1" was released on the internet.

In mid-2013, she released her official debut album, an original EP titled Babo Kateun Story (바보 같은 Story).

Then, from late 2014 to mid-2016, she released at least six additional EPs (mostly covers of songs in English, but also some original, Korean language songs).

Early in 2017, she released her first full-length covers album, Blossom. By November of the same year, she had released five additional EPs and her YouTube channel had surpassed 5 million subscribers.

80 tracks from more than 10 of her EPs were then re-released in April 2018 as Rose: The J.Fla Collection. Also during 2018, J.Fla released two all-new full-length albums, covering a diverse array of artists, including Taylor Swift, ABBA, The Chainsmokers, Ariana Grande, and Queen.

On November 16, 2018, J.Fla became the first independent South Korean YouTuber to achieve more than 10 million subscribers. As of March 2021, she has more than 17 million subscribers. In late 2019, J.Fla released several new original songs with accompanying music videos, starting with "Good Vibe" on September 6.

In September 2022, J.Fla announced the formation of her own record company, GOODSEN ENTERTAINMENT, based in South Korea. An original 10-track album was announced, with the lead single "Bedroom Singer" having its international debut on October 7 at 12:00 KST. The album was subsequently named "Burn The Flower" and was released on June 8, 2023.

== Discography ==
=== Collaborations ===
- 진돗개 feat. J.Fla - 틱톡 (Jin Doggae feat. J.Fla - Tic Toc) (August 14, 2013)

=== Singles and original songs ===
- My Tiny Miracle (September 1, 2014)
- Why (February 16, 2015)
- 너에게 닿기를 / Hoping To Reach You (May 2, 2016)
- Baby Baby Baby (June 13, 2016)
- Good Vibe (September 6, 2019)
- Are You My Villain (October 11, 2019)
- Starlight (November 8, 2019)
- On My Way To Meet You (March 22, 2024)
- Idea: Golden Key (September 12, 2024)
- You Are Beautiful (October 25, 2024)
- Alien (December 5, 2024)
- One Sweet Day in Paris (April 11, 2025)
- Lines On My Heart (May 30, 2025)
- Steller Paradox (July 11, 2025)
- Night Without Sleep (November 14, 2025)
- Countdown (December 30, 2025)
- Miss The You (January 29, 2026)

=== EPs and mini-albums ===
- 바보 같은 Story / Stupid Story / Foolish Story (July 26, 2013)
- 화살 (Arrow) (December 15, 2014)
- Cover Sessions (November 27, 2015)
- 찬란육리 / Merry (March 21, 2016)
- Cover Sessions 2 (April 29, 2016)
- Grey Skies (July 29, 2016)
- Say Something (February 16, 2017)
- Inspiration (February 24, 2017)
- Orchid (May 26, 2017)
- Gold (June 9, 2017)
- New Rules (November 21, 2017)
- Colours: The First (May 2, 2024)
- Colours: The Second (June 3, 2024)
- Colours: The Third (July 5, 2024)
- Colours: The Last (August 2, 2024)

=== Albums ===
- Blossom (March 10, 2017)
- Rose: The J.Fla Collection (April 26, 2018)
- Believer (August 17, 2018)
- Natural (December 7, 2018)
- Memories (March 31, 2023)
- Burn The Flower (June 8, 2023)
