= Ostereo =

Manchester-based record label

- Founded: 2016
- Founder: Howard Murphy
- Genre: Pop, EDM, alternative, electronic, acoustic
- Country of origin: England
- Location: Manchester, London
- Official website: ostereo.com

Ostereo is a UK-based record label, publisher, influencer, and marketing company using technology to promote streams and video views for its artists. The organization is also known for providing management services. Ostereo was founded in April 2016 by Howard Murphy.

== History ==
In 2010, Blackpool-born Howard Murphy founded Amurco, a music sync and licensing agency servicing brands and broadcasters such as Ferrari, IKEA, Netflix, and MTV. Murphy launched Ostereo in Manchester in 2016. Its business model combines aspects of the traditional music industry with technology and data to promote artists and build their careers in the modern media industry. To this end, the company places emphasis on social media such as Facebook, Instagram and Twitter, user-generated-content platforms like YouTube and TikTok, and music streaming services like Spotify, Apple Music, and Deezer.

Ostereo was first located at The Landing at MediaCityUK, a hub for high-growth technology. As of 2023, Ostereo is headquartered in both Manchester and London, with team members located in both cities.

== Model of Operation ==
Ostereo is known for working with artists, writers, and producers for whom it acts as a label, management agency, and publisher. The company and its artists earn their income from music streaming, performance royalties, YouTube ad revenue, live performances, merchandise, and other performative activities. In its first year of operation, Ostereo placed its artists across different digital service providers that received 400 million music streams and over 1 billion YouTube views.

== Artists ==
One of the first few artists whom Ostereo promoted, Joel Corry, released his single, Sunlight, through Ostereo in 2017. Joel Corry established his DJ profile on MTV's Geordie Shore. He has completed a club tour of the United Kingdom. Later, Corry reached the top of the UK singles charts through his collaboration with MNEK, Head & Heart, released in July 2020.

In March 2018, Ostereo released Dutch singer-songwriter Nina June's album, Bon Voyage. Prior to that, the track "For Love" received over four million Spotify listens, and was used along with "When We Fall" in Dutch, Belgian, and American films and television programs. Jimmy Choo, LK Bennett, Hobbs, and Farrow & Ball added "Til Dawn" to their global in-store playlists.

In late 2019, Ostereo released the debut singles Good Vibe, Are U My Villain, and Starlight from Korean artist J.Fla. In their first six months, they accumulated over 10 million streams and views across global music platforms. J.Fla reached the charts in Singapore, Taiwan, Korea, and China. As of June 2023, Fla had amassed over 17 million subscribers on her YouTube channel.

In 2019, Ostereo released Chapter 11, the debut EP of London-based singer songwriter Mysie. The EP received critical acclaim and saw Mysie featured on The Independent’s Ones to Watch, BBC 6 Music, and The Great Escape in May 2020. In 2020, Mysie was awarded an Ivor Novello in the Rising Star Awards category.

Bulgarian artist VICTORIA signed to the label in 2019 and her first release under Ostereo, Tears Getting Sober, was the Bulgarian entry for the 2020 Eurovision Song Contest. The single was considered the bookies’ favorite to win the competition. Due to its cancellation in 2020, VICTORIA was invited back to Eurovision 2021 to perform original track "Growing Up Is Getting Old" on behalf of Bulgaria. VICTORIA came third in the semifinal and finished in the final at 11th place.

Pianist Karim Kamar's Small Mvmnts album, released in May 2020 under Ostereo, received attention from listeners and publications including The Independent. Following his initial breakthrough, Kamar achieved a series of viral moments through his captivating public piano performance videos. In 2022, he inaugurated the Sky Sports coverage for the F1 Silverstone Grand Prix. In March 2022, Karim Kamar became a member of the PETROF Piano family.

In January 2020, Ostereo signed Indian pop sensation AiSh to their label. Since signing to Ostereo, AiSh has released a string of covers and original singles.

In February 2021, Ostereo signed Indonesian artist Shania Yan. Shania performs covers online, with over 2 million cumulative listeners. In July 2021, Shania Yan released a cover of George Benson’s "Nothing’s Gonna Change My Love For You". The cover received over forty million YouTube views and fourteen million Spotify streams. Shania has also released 16 EPs, five original singles, one album, and one collaboration single.

In 2021, Ostereo signed Filipino singer Noah Raquel. Using only his iPhone, Raquel is a producer who got his start posting DIY covers on YouTube. As of June 2023, Raquel had 500,000 YouTube subscribers and 900,000 followers on TikTok. He is a collaborator with BandLab, posting numerous sponsored videos in partnership with the company. In September 2022, Noah Raquel released his first original single with Ostereo, "Nakalimutan". The track had over 45,000 Spotify streams in its opening weekend and was featured by MTV Asia.

== Ostereo Publishing ==
In late 2019, John Saunderson joined Ostereo after serving at Notting Hill Music for 15 years. Ostereo Publishing has secured multiple opportunities for its writers, including a sync placement on a New Balance advert for artist/writer Bamtone primarily for a Facebook campaign.

In October 2020, Ostereo concluded a deal with Distiller Music to act as sub-publisher for Distiller's publishing catalogue and roster of writers and producers. Distiller previously worked with Kobalt in this capacity. The deal led to Ostereo’s management clients, Tom Enzy and Rion S, attending a virtual writing camp in 2021 with Distiller Music’s writers. At the camp, they wrote the "In The Dark", released by Sophie and the Giants and Purple Disco Machine, which charted in several European territories.

Deals with major artists include Able Faces’ cut on Marc Benjamin's "Losing Focus" in 2020, and Canadian singer Nina Carr’s part on Effemar’s Saturday Night, released in 2021.

In May 2023, Ostereo launched a new series of songwriting camps, "Song Circle". The inaugural edition of Song Circle was held at Abbey Road Studios and was conducted in partnership with Warner Chappell Music Benelux, with both publishers including songwriters and producers from their respective rosters.

== Partnerships ==
In 2020, Ostereo completed deals with Peermusic UK and Sony Music Japan to administer their publishing royalties.

=== Plymouth Marjon University ===
In 2022, Ostereo launched a new division, Ostereo Education, focused on the provision of a higher education degree programme, BA Hons Music Business, awarded by Plymouth Marjon University
