= A Finnish Summer with Turisas =

- Film poster
- Starring: Turisas
- Distributed by: Century Media
- Release date: 3 November 2008
- Running time: 160 minutes

Professional ratings
Review scores
Source	Rating
Metal.de	9/10

A Finnish Summer with Turisas is a documentary film by and about the Finnish metal band Turisas, featuring live performances. It was released on 3 November 2008 in Europe and 25 November 2008 for the United States.

== Critical reception ==
Powermetal.de said the disc is a must-have for the fans of the band. Exclaim! wrote: "A Finnish Summer with Turisas is one of the better metal DVDs I've seen lately [...]".

== Track listing ==
Summer festival live performances:

1. As Torches Rise
2. To Holmgard and Beyond
3. A Portage to the Unknown
4. The Messenger
5. One More
6. In the Court of Jarisleif
7. Fields of Gold
8. The Dnieper Rapids
9. The Land of Hope and Glory
10. Miklagard Overture
11. Sahti-Waari
12. Rasputin
13. Battle Metal

Extras:

- 70-minute tour documentary
- Rasputin Music Video
- Blooper Reel

Limited edition includes:

- Warpaint colour card
- "Battle Metal 2008" 3"CD

=== Recordings ===
- Ruisrock 2008: "As Torches Rise", "In the Court of Jarisleif", "Rasputin"
- Nummirock 2008: "To Holmgard and Beyond", "One More", "The Dneiper Rapids", "Miklagard Overture", "Battle Metal"
- Ilosaarirock 2008: "A Portage to the Unknown", "Fields of Gold", "Sahti-Waari"
- Wanaja 2008: "The Messenger"
- Voimasointu 2008: "The Land of Hope and Glory"
