= Blood Feud (novel) =

1976 children's historical novel by Rosemary Sutcliff

- First edition (UK)
- Author: Rosemary Sutcliff
- Cover artist: Charles Keeping
- Language: English
- Genre: Historical novel
- Publisher: Oxford University Press
- Publication date: 1976
- Publication place: United Kingdom
- Media type: Print (Hardback)
- ISBN: 0-525-26730-1

Blood Feud is a historical novel for children written by Rosemary Sutcliff and published in 1976.

It begins in 10th Century England, and tells the tale of an orphaned child of a Celtic father and Saxon mother, who is caught up with the Vikings and ultimately journeys all the way to Constantinople via the Dnieper trading route. The plot is driven by the acceptance of a blood feud commitment, and the struggles of a child born between many cultures to reconcile his beliefs with this commitment. In 1990 it was adapted into an ITV children's drama series called Sea Dragon, produced by Thames Television.

== Plot summary ==
The story is told in the first-person by Jestyn the Englishman as he recounts his life and how he ended up in Constantinople. After being orphaned, he is captured by Viking raiders and sold into slavery in Dublin. His owner Thormod frees him for good service, and Jestyn joins the crew of Thormod's ship when they leave Dublin to return to Denmark. Upon return, Thormod finds his father killed by childhood friends, and swears the blood feud after which the novel is named. Jestyn and Thormod swear blood brotherhood and set off to pursue the killers.

The journey takes them across the Baltic, up the Dvina and down the Dnieper to Kiev, where they enlist in the service of Grand Prince Vladimir who has agreed to fight for Basil II in return for the hand in marriage of Basil's sister Anna. The fighting is resolved, and both Thormod and Jestyn join the newly formed Varangian Guard. The feud is ultimately resolved, but with many twists and turns, and Jestyn finally settles to live in Constantinople.

The theme of the novel revolves around Jestyn's struggle to find belonging, as he is caught between conflicting values, conflicting cultures, and conflicting religions. The historical background depicts the Christianization of Kievan Rus', and Jestyn's mixed feelings as he carries an original Christian value system of his youth alongside the commitment of blood feud and blood brotherhood of Norse paganism.
