= Stand Up and Fight (album) =

Studio album by Turisas
- Released: 23 February 2011
- Recorded: March–September 2010, Sound Supreme Studio, Hämeenlinna, Finland
- Genre: Symphonic metal; folk metal; power metal
- Label: Century Media
- Producer: Mathias Nygård

Turisas chronology
The Varangian Way (2007)	Stand Up and Fight (2011)	Turisas2013 (2013)

Professional ratings
Review scores
Source	Rating
AllMusic	4.5/5 stars
Metal Forces	8/10

Stand Up and Fight is the third studio album by the Finnish folk metal band Turisas, released worldwide on 23 February 2011 through Century Media as a single-disc jewelcase and two-disc digibook. It is based on the Varangian Guard, norsemen in the service of the Byzantine Empire.

== Track listing ==
1. "The March of the Varangian Guard" – 3:51
2. "Take the Day!" – 5:26
3. "Hunting Pirates" – 3:43
4. "Βένετοι! - Πράσινοι!" (Venetoi! - Prasinoi!) – 3:49
5. "Stand Up and Fight" – 5:27
6. "The Great Escape" – 4:51
7. "Fear the Fear" – 6:13
8. "End of an Empire" – 7:13
9. "The Bosphorus Freezes Over" – 5:37

Bonus disc track listing

1. "Broadsword" (Jethro Tull cover, audio bonus track) – 5:01
2. "Supernaut" (Black Sabbath cover, audio bonus track) – 3:57
3. "Acoustic Jam Session" (DVD content. A live in-studio recording of the band playing acoustic versions of "The March of the Varangian Guard", "Stand Up and Fight", "To Holmgard and Beyond") – 14:20

== Personnel ==
- Mathias Nygård – vocals, keyboards, programming
- Jussi Wickström – guitars, backing vocals
- Hannes Horma – bass guitar, backing vocals, additional programming
- Olli Vänskä – violin, backing vocals
- Netta Skog – accordion
- Tude Lehtonen – drums
