= Viking Trilogy =

Book series by Henry Treece

- Viking's Dawn, The Road to Miklagard, Viking's Sunset
- Author: Henry Treece
- Country: United Kingdom
- Language: English
- Genre: Juvenile historical
- Published: 1955, 1957, 1960
- No. of books: 3

The Viking Trilogy is a trilogy of juvenile historical novels by Henry Treece.

They are Viking's Dawn, The Road to Miklagard and Viking's Sunset. Treece wrote several juvenile historical novels, some set during the Viking Age, and this trilogy is regarded as among his best.

The three novels describe the adventures of Harald Sigurdson, a Norwegian Viking. He goes on three voyages, which between them are representative of the various voyages which were made by the Vikings, and which take place at different stages in his life.

== Viking's Dawn ==
Harald is an adolescent who sails on a raid to Scotland. They come to grief on an island in the Hebrides.

== The Road to Miklagard ==
Harald is now a young man whose father has died. He has a complicated series of adventures which takes him to a giant's treasure cave in Ireland, then Jebel Tarik (Gibraltar), then to Miklagard (the Norse name for Constantinople) where he joins the famous Varangian Guard. Eventually Harald returns home to Norway via the land of the Khazars and the great ship-portage on the Dnieper.

== Viking's Sunset ==
Harald is now a mature man who enjoys a peaceful life of farming with his wife and sons. When his village is attacked, he forms a crew of soldiers and pursues the raiders. The chase leads him across the Atlantic Ocean to the east coast of America. He and his crew encounter Inuit and then Native Americans. Harald's final fight takes place among the native tribes. In a great battle, it is revealed that he is a berserker. Significant scenes include the death of one of the raiders, Havlock Ingolfsson, whom Harald abandons to die on a skerry, and Harald's death at the hands of Heome, the mad handless brother of heroic Wawasha. The brothers have similarities with Loki and Balder respectively. This novel has obvious parallels with the Norse Vinland saga.
