= Henry Treece =

British poet and writer (1911-1966)

- Henry Treece at his desk
- Born: 22 December 1911; Wednesbury, Staffordshire, England
- Died: 10 June 1966 (aged 54); United Kingdom
- Occupation: Author
- Writing career
- Years active: 1940–1966
- Genres: Children's historical fiction, poetry
- Notable works: Viking Trilogy; The Children's Crusade; The Golden Strangers

Henry Treece (22 December 1911 – 10 June 1966) was a British poet and writer who also worked as a teacher and editor. He wrote a range of works but is mostly remembered as a writer of children's historical novels.

== Life and work ==
Treece was born in Wednesbury, Staffordshire, and educated at the town's grammar school. After graduating from the University of Birmingham in 1933, he went into teaching with his first placement being at Tynemouth School. In 1939 he married Mary Woodman and settled in Lincolnshire as a teacher at Barton-upon-Humber Grammar School. Their son, Richard Treece, became a musician with Help Yourself and other rock bands.

He published five volumes of poetry: 38 Poems (London: Fortune Press, 1940), then by Faber & Faber; Invitation and Warning 1942; The Black Seasons 1945; The Haunted Garden 1947; and The Exiles 1952. He appeared in the 1949 The New British Poets: an anthology edited by Kenneth Rexroth; but from 1952 with The Dark Island he devoted himself to fiction. His best known are his juvenile historical novels, particularly those set in the Viking Age, although he also wrote some adult historical novels. Many of his novels are set in transitional periods in history, where more primitive societies are forced to face modernisation, e.g. the end of the Viking period, or the Roman conquest of Britain. His play Carnival King (Faber & Faber) was produced at Nottingham Playhouse in 1953. He also worked as a radio broadcaster.

In World War II he served as an intelligence officer in the RAF and helped John Pudney edit Air Force Poetry.

Other poetry anthologies he was involved with include The New Apocalypse (1939) with J. F. Hendry giving its name to the New Apocalyptics movement; two further anthologies with Hendry followed. He wrote a critical study of Dylan Thomas, called Dylan Thomas – Dog among the fairies, published by Lindsay Drummond, London, in 1949. He and Thomas became estranged over Thomas's refusal to sign up as a New Apocalyptic.

He also wrote Conquerors in 1932, as a way to reflect on the horrors of war.

He edited issues of the magazines Transformation, and A New Romantic Anthology (1949) with Stefan Schimanski, issues of Kingdom Come: The Magazine of War-Time Oxford with Schimanski and Alan Rook, as well as War-Time Harvest. How I See Apocalypse (London, Lindsay Drummond, 1946) was a retrospective statement. Treece died from a heart attack in 1966.

Treece's residency in Barton-upon-Humber is recorded by a blue plaque on East Acridge House, erected by the Civic Society in 2010.

== Works ==
- 38 Poems (Fortune Press, 1940)
- The White Horseman: Prose and Verse of the New Apocalypse, edited by J. F. Hendry and Henry Treece (Routledge, 1941)
- Invitation and Warning (Faber, 1942) poetry
- Transformation, edited by Stefan Schimanski and Henry Treece (Lindsay Drummond, 1943)
- Wartime Harvest: an anthology of prose and verse, edited by Stefan Schimanski and Henry Treece (John Bale and Staples, 1943)
- Short piece in Writing Today, edited by Denys Val Baker and Peter Ratazzi (Staples, 1943)
- Air Force Poetry, edited by John Pudney and Henry Treece (John Lane, 1944)
- Herbert Read: an introduction to his work by various hands, edited by Henry Treece (Faber, 1944)
- A Map of Hearts, edited by Stefan Schimanski and Henry Treece (Lindsay Drummond, 1944)
- Transformation 2, edited by Stefan Schimanski and Henry Treece (Lindsay Drummond, 1944)
- The Black Seasons (Faber, 1945) poetry
- The Crown and the Sickle: An Anthology edited by J. F. Hendry and Henry Treece (Staples, 1945)
- Transformation 3, edited by Stefan Schimanski and Henry Treece (Lindsay Drummond, 1945)
- How I See Apocalypse (Lindsay Drummond, 1946)
- I Cannot go Hunting Tomorrow (The Grey Walls Press, 1946) short stories
- Transformation 4, edited by Stefan Schimanski and Henry Treece (Lindsay Drummond, 1946)
- The Haunted Garden (Faber, 1947) poetry
- Leaves in the Storm: a book of diaries, edited with a running commentary by Stefan Schimanski and Henry Treece (Lindsay Drummond, 1947)
- Selected Poems of Algernon Charles Swinburne, edited with an introduction by Henry Treece (The Grey Walls Press, 1948)
- Dylan Thomas: Dog among the fairies (Ernest Benn, 1949) criticism
- A New Romantic Anthology, edited by Stefan Schimanski and Henry Treece (The Grey Walls Press, 1949)
- The Exiles (Faber, 1952) poetry
- The Dark Island (Gollancz, 1952) novel
- The Rebels (Gollancz, 1953) novel
- Desperate Journey (Faber, 1954) for children
- Legions of the Eagle (The Bodley Head, 1954) historical novel for young people, set in the Roman conquest of Britain
- The Eagles Have Flown (The Bodley Head, 1954) historical novel for young people
- Ask for King Billy (Faber, 1955) for children
- Carnival King: A play in Three Acts (Faber, 1955) verse play
- Viking's Dawn (The Bodley Head, 1955) historical novel for young people, first in the Viking Trilogy
- Hounds of the King (The Bodley Head, 1955) historical novel for young people
- The Golden Strangers (The Bodley Head, 1956), set in prehistoric Britain
- The Great Captains (The Bodley Head, 1956) novel
- Hunter Hunted (Faber, 1957) for children
- Men of the Hills (The Bodley Head, 1957) historical novel for young people
- The Road to Miklagard (The Bodley Head, 1957) historical novel for young people, second in the Viking Trilogy
- The Children's Crusade (The Bodley Head, 1958) historical novel for young people
- Don't Expect Any Mercy (Faber, 1958) for children
- The Return of Robinson Crusoe (Hulton Press - An Eagle Novel, 1958) historical novel for young people
- Red Queen, White Queen (The Bodley Head, 1958) novel
- Ride into Danger (Criterion Books, USA, 1959) novel
- The Master of Badger's Hall (Random House, USA, 1959)
- The Bombard (The Bodley Head, 1959) historical novel for young people
- Castles and Kings (Batsford, 1959)
- The True Books about Castles (Frederick Muller, 1959)
- Wickham and the Armada (Hulton Press - An Eagle Novel, 1959) historical novel for young people
- A Fighting Man (The Bodley Head, 1960) novel
- Viking's Sunset (The Bodley Head, 1960) historical novel for young people, third in the Viking Trilogy
- Red Settlement (The Bodley Head - Earlham Library, 1960) historical novel for young people
- The Golden One (The Bodley Head, 1961) historical novel for young people
- The Jet Beads (Brockhampton Press, 1961) novel
- Jason (The Bodley Head, 1961) novel
- The Crusades (The Bodley Head, 1962)
- Man with a Sword (The Bodley Head, 1962) historical novel for young people, about Hereward the Wake
- War Dog (Brockhampton Press, 1962) historical novel for young people
- Fighting Men: how men have fought through the ages (with Ronald Ewart Oakeshott) (Brockhampton Press, 1963)
- Horned Helmet (Brockhampton Press, 1963) historical novel for young people, about the Jomsvikings
- Electra (The Bodley Head, 1963) novel
- The Crusades (Blackie - Know About Series, 1963) history
- The Burning of Njal (The Bodley Head, 1964) historical novel for young people
- The Last of the Vikings (Brockhampton Press, 1964) historical novel for young people, about Harald Hardrada
- Oedipus (The Bodley Head, 1964) novel
- The Bronze Sword (Hamish Hamilton - Antelope Books, 1965) historical novel for young people
- Splintered Sword (Brockhampton Press, 1965) historical novel for young people
- Killer in Dark Glasses (Faber, 1965) novel
- Two Radio Plays (accompanying a new edition of Hounds of the King - Longmans, 1965)
- Bang You're Dead! (Faber, 1966) novel
- The Queen's Brooch (Hamish Hamilton, 1966) historical novel for young people, set during Boudicca's rebellion
- The Green Man (The Bodley Head, 1966)
- Swords from the North (Faber, 1966) historical novel for young people
- The Windswept City (Hamish Hamilton - Reindeer Books, 1967) historical novel for young people, set in the Trojan War
- Vinland the Good (The Bodley Head, 1967) historical novel for young people
- The Dream Time (Brockhampton Press, 1967) historical novel for young people
- The Centurion (Meredith Press, 1967) an 'augmented' version of The Bronze Sword (1965)

== Adult historical fiction ==
- Celtic Tetralogy (ordered by chronological setting)
  - 1) The Golden Strangers (1956); (titled The Invaders in the U.S.), about the arrival of the Celts in Britain
  - 2) The Dark Island (1952); (titled The Savage Warriors in the U.S.), about the defeat of Caratacus by the Romans after their invasion of Britain
  - 3) Red Queen, White Queen (1958); (titled The Pagan Queen in the U.S.), about Boudica and the rebellion she led against Rome, as told through the eyes of a young Roman Imperial agent
  - 4) The Great Captains (1956), a realistic story of King Arthur and the struggle of Celtic Britain to survive after the departure of the Romans
- The Rebels (1953). Set during the last decade of Victoria's reign, it follows the fluctuating fortunes of the Fisher family, ironmasters who live in the Black Country town of Darlaston. Their ancestors were strong, tough and unpretentious, but now the family aspires to comfortable Victorian gentility.
- Trilogy set in Mycenaean Greece, based on legendary characters:
  - Jason (1961)
  - Electra (also spelt Elektra for some editions) – US title The Amber Princess (1963)
  - Oedipus – US title The Eagle King (1964)
- The Green Man (1966) A reworking of Amleth's Vengeance from the Gesta Danorum of Saxo Grammaticus (the basis for Shakespeare's tragedy, Hamlet). Set in 6th century Jutland (Denmark), Duke Arthur's Britain and Caledonia (Scotland). Contains fantasy elements.

== Journal ==
- New Apocalyptics a periodical (edited with J. F. Hendry)

== Further reading and critical works ==
- Pauline Clarke, Henry Treece: Lament for a Maker, in TLS 5: Essays and Reviews from The Times Literary Supplement 1966. (London: Times Publishing 1966), pp. 7–104. Reprinted in Only Connect: Readings on children's literature, ed.Sheila Egoff et al. Toronto New York: Oxford University Press (Canadian Branch), 1969, pp. 256–264.
- Margery Fisher, Henry Treece in Three Bodley Head Monographs. London: Bodley Head, 1969, pp. 7–104.
- James Gifford, Personal Modernisms, Edmonton: University of Alberta Press, 2014.
- Arthur Edward Salmon, Poets of the Apocalypse, Twayne's English Authors Series, 360. Boston:Twayne, 1983.
- Caroline C. Hunt, Henry Treece, in British Children's Writers, 1914-1960. Ed. Donald R. Hettinga & Gart D Schmidt. Detroit: Gale Research, 1996. Dictionary of Literary Biography, Vol. 160. (Web: Gale Literature Resource Center).
- Catie Cary, Glorious Bloody Days: An appreciation of Henry Treece's life and historical fiction for adults. Special feature on Henry Treece published in Solander (Journal of the Historical Novel Society), 14 November 2003
