= The Varangian Way =

Studio album by Turisas
- Released: UK: 28 May 2007; Finland: 6 June 2007; Europe: 18 June 2007; North America: 17 July 2007; Japan: 25 July 2007
- Recorded: November 2006 – March 2007 at Sound Supreme Studio, Hämeenlinna, Finland
- Genres: Folk metal; symphonic metal; Viking metal; power metal
- Length: 42:57
- Label: Century Media
- Producers: Mathias "Warlord" Nygård, Janne Saska

Turisas chronology
Battle Metal (2004)	The Varangian Way (2007)	Stand Up and Fight (2011)

The Varangian Way is the second full-length album by the Finnish folk metal band Turisas, released on 27 May 2007 through Century Media. It is a concept album that tells the story of a group of Scandinavians traveling the river routes of medieval Kievan Rus' (territory of modern Belarus, Ukraine and Russia), through Ladoga, Novgorod and Kyiv, down to the Eastern Roman Empire.

A special director's cut edition was released with the "Rasputin" single.

Professional ratings
Review scores
Source	Rating
AllMusic	link
PopMatters	link

== Track listing ==
1. "To Holmgard and Beyond" – 5:17
2. "A Portage to the Unknown" – 4:50
3. "Cursed Be Iron" – 5:03
4. "Fields of Gold" – 4:34
5. "In the Court of Jarisleif" – 3:17
6. "Five Hundred and One" – 6:18
7. "The Dnieper Rapids" – 5:20
8. "Miklagard Overture" – 8:18
9. "Rasputin" (Boney M. cover) (Director's Cut bonus track) – 3:53
10. "To Holmgard and Beyond" [Single Edit] (Enhanced edition bonus track) – 3:00
11. "Rex Regi Rebellis" [Finnish Version with Prologue] (Enhanced edition bonus track) – 10:20
12. "Battle Metal" Live at Party San '06 (Enhanced edition bonus track) – 5:40

A Limited Edition "Pagan Fest Tour Edition" version comes with two bonus tracks, Rasputin and To Holmgard and Beyond (single edit), and a DVD containing the video for Rasputin and several live performances.

== Credits ==
- Mathias "Warlord" Nygård – vocals, orchestral programming, keyboard
- Jussi Wickström – guitar
- Tuomas "Tude" Lehtonen – drums, percussion
- Olli Vänskä – violin
- Hannes "Hanu" Horma – bass, backing vocals
- Janne "Lisko" Mäkinen – accordion
- Music by Mathias Nygård, except track 3 (Nygård/Wickström), 5 (Nygård/Lisko/Vänskä) and 6 (Nygård/Vänskä).
- Lyrics by Mathias Nygård, except track 3 (traditional/Elias Lönnrot), taken from the Finnish national epic, the Kalevala.
- Classical choir recorded at Vanha Kirjastotalo Music Hall, Tampere, Finland.
- Orchestral samples included in this recording from the Vienna Symphonic Library.

== See also ==
- Trade route from the Varangians to the Greeks
- The Long Ships (historical novel dealing with the same subject)
- Kalevala (the lyrics of "Cursed Be Iron" contain a section of the poem "The Origin of Iron")

== Sources ==
- Century Media press statement
- Turisas studio diary
- Turisas official website
