= Turisas =

Finnish metal band

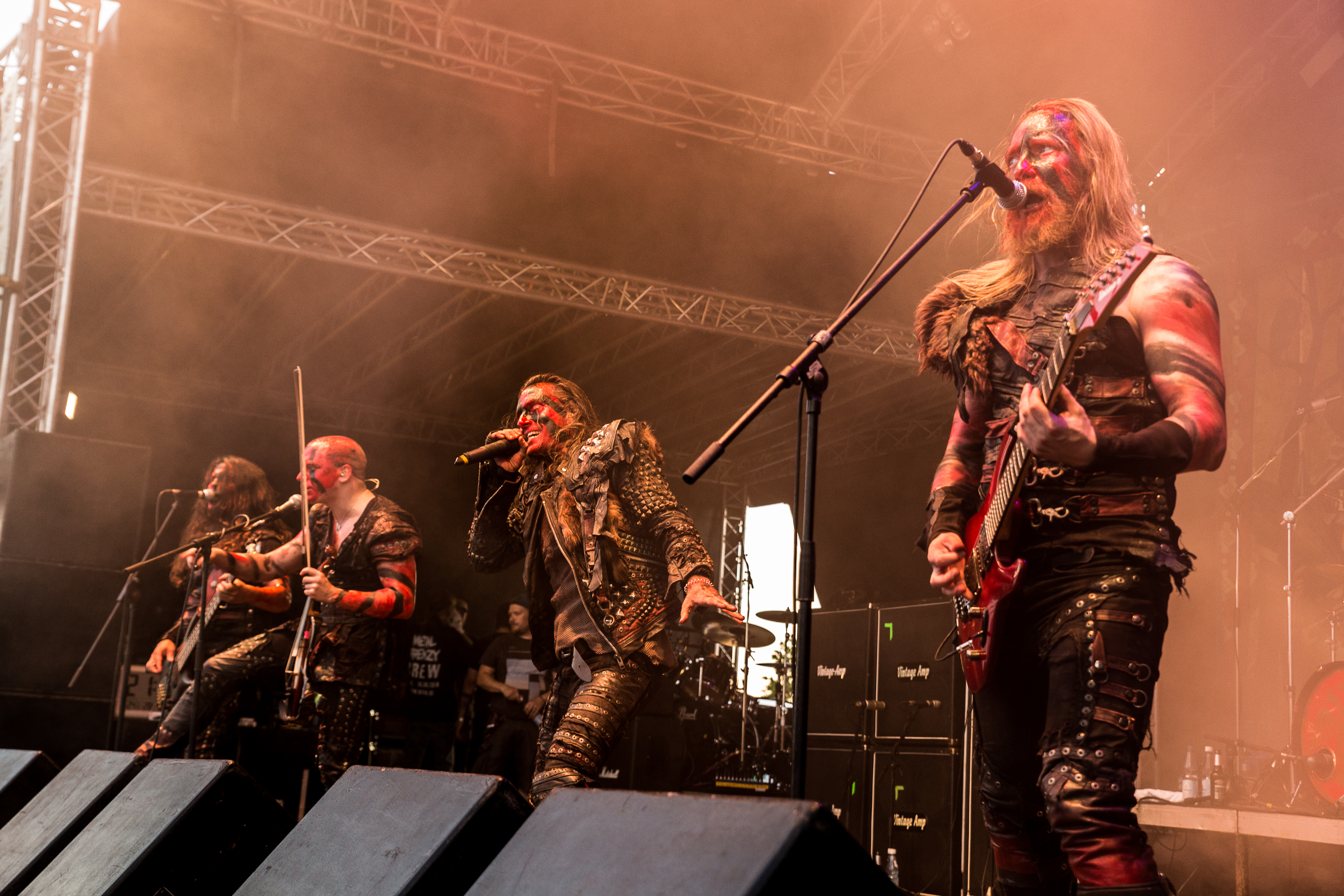
- Turisas performing at Metal Frenzy 2018

Background information
- Origin: Hämeenlinna, Finland
- Genres: Folk metal, symphonic metal, Viking metal, power metal
- Years active: 1997–2022 (on hiatus)
- Label: Century Media
- Members: Mathias Nygård; Jussi Wickström; Olli Vänskä; Jaakko Jakku; Jesper Anastasiadis
- Past members: See former member section
- Website: turisas.com

Turisas is a Finnish metal band from Hämeenlinna. They were founded in 1997 by Mathias Nygård and Jussi Wickström, and named after an ancient Finnish god of war.

Turisas plays folk metal, incorporating elements of power metal and symphonic metal along with frequent harsh vocals. They are known to play most of their solos on electric violin, as opposed to traditional guitar solos.

== History ==
=== Battle Metal (2004–2007) ===
Since 2003, Turisas have been signed to Century Media Records, which released their debut album Battle Metal in 2004. Then the band went on a European tour with various guest musicians on instruments such as violins and accordions.

On 28 October 2005, guitarist Georg Laakso was badly injured in a car accident and due to the extent of his spinal cord injuries, on 12 July 2006 issued a statement of his permanent resignation from the band on the official website. Nevertheless, the band continued to work on their second album, titled The Varangian Way, which was released in early 2007. Jussi Wickström recorded all guitars on the album.

Mathias Nygård revealed in the January 2007 edition of Terrorizer magazine that the touring musicians Hannes Horma, Olli Vänskä, Janne Mäkinen and Antti Laurila had been added to the band as full-time members, taking them up to an 8-piece act. It later turned out that of the two accordion players, only Mäkinen had become an official member. Laurila is no longer a touring musician for the band. On 19 February 2007, keyboardist Antti Ventola posted a message on the Turisas discussion forum announcing that he and the band had parted ways. This was later confirmed by the rest of the band. Mathias Nygård performed the keyboards on The Varangian Way and Turisas are presently using backing tracks to replicate them on stage.

=== The Varangian Way (2007–2010) ===
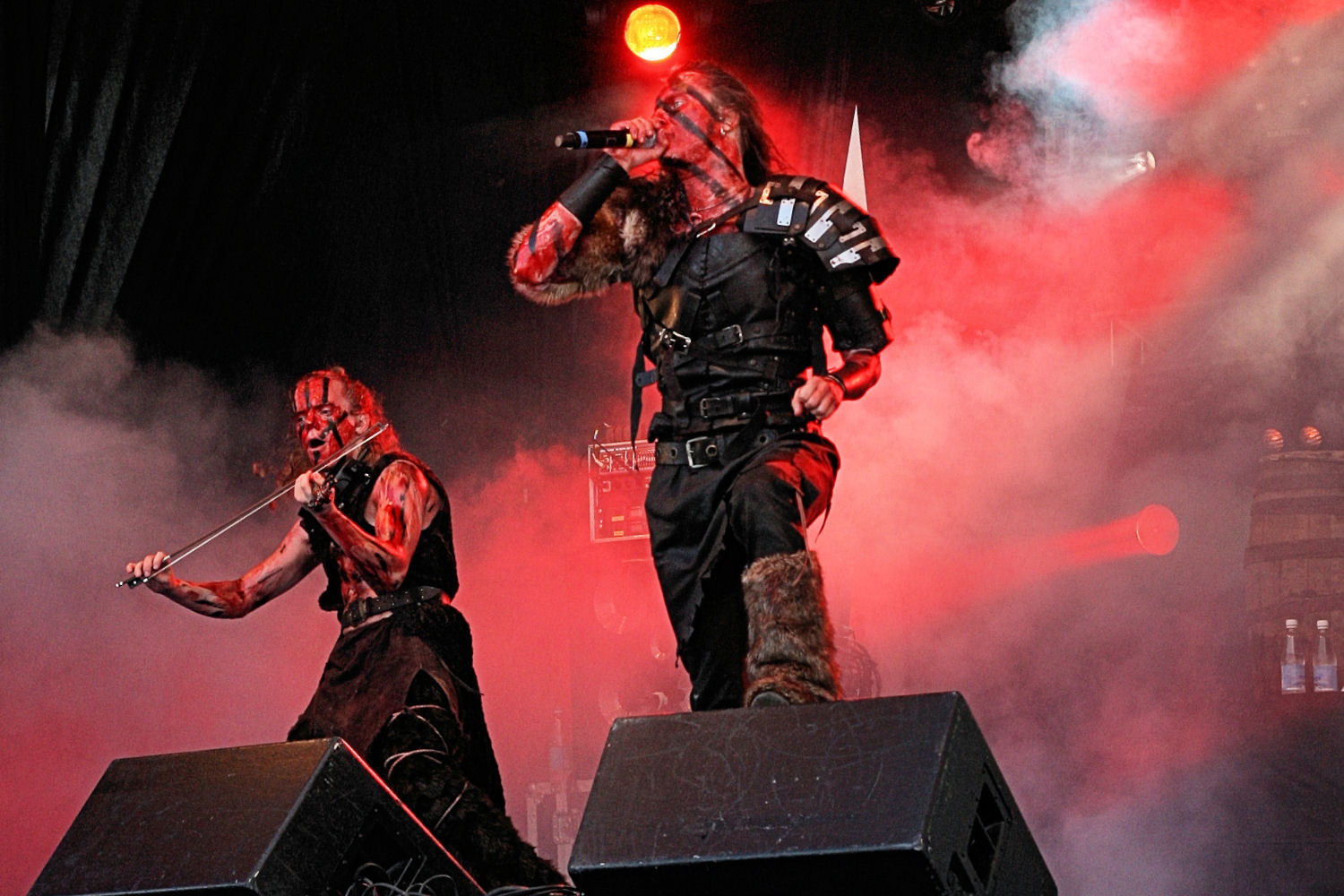
Turisas at Ilosaarirock 2008

In January 2008, accordion player Janne "Lisko" Mäkinen disappeared mysteriously in Amsterdam. For the upcoming tour dates in spring 2008 Turisas announced Netta Skog as a step-in accordionist. She had already helped the band on the European tour in October–November 2007. Netta was soon after added to the band on a full-time basis.

After a string of festivals in the Summer of 2008, in September the band started a long tour through the United States and Europe in support of DragonForce. This tour ended in March 2009, and the band then took part in a new European tour with Cradle of Filth and Moonspell, dubbed the "Filthfest Tour 2009", in April and May 2009. The band played at Wacken Open Air in early August 2009 and also played at Bloodstock Open Air in mid August 2009. The band took time off at the end of 2009 to make a new album and then planned to return as fully-fledged band no longer supporting others. In 2010 the band concentrated on finishing the recordings of the upcoming third album. Still, the band did a short tour in Asia and Australia in May 2010, including headline concerts in Sydney and Melbourne, two gigs in China, a gig in Shanghai World Expo 2010 and a gig in Japan.

=== Stand Up and Fight (2011–2012) ===
As of March 2010, Turisas announced they were in the studio working on a new album; at that time, the band documented the recording process in a series of studio diary videos on YouTube. The title for the latest album, Stand Up and Fight, was revealed on 11 November 2010: the album was released through Century Media on 28 February in Europe and 8 March in North America. A new song off that album: "The March of the Varangian Guard" was performed at the band's Finnish gigs in October 2010 On 17 December 2010, the title track "Stand Up And Fight" was released as a free download on the band's website.

The band took part in tours in Mexico and North America with Cradle of Filth, the other supporting bands being Nachtmystium and Daniel Lioneye beginning in January 2011 and in Europe with Die Apokalyptischen Reiter from March through April 2011. Their England tour came with Crimfall as the supporting band, as well as other local supporting bands. 2012 saw them headline the North American "Paganfest: America Part III" tour with Alestorm, Arkona and Huntress in tow.

=== Turisas2013 (2013–present) ===
In November 2012, the band announced they had started work on their fourth album titled Turisas2013. The album was published on 21 August 2013 in Finland and 26 August in Europe, while the UK followed on 2 September and North America on 3 September.

In the late 2010s, the band became less active. In 2019, Olli Vänskä opted not to tour for family reasons and was temporarily replaced by Caitlin De Ville in the following tour. Next year, most of the Turisas' appearances were cancelled due to COVID-19 pandemic. Their last concert was held in February 2020, at Cernunnos Pagan Festival in France. After the vinyl re-release of their first three albums in 2022, Turisas ceased any activity, both offline and online, although there was no official announcement of disbanding.

== Band members ==
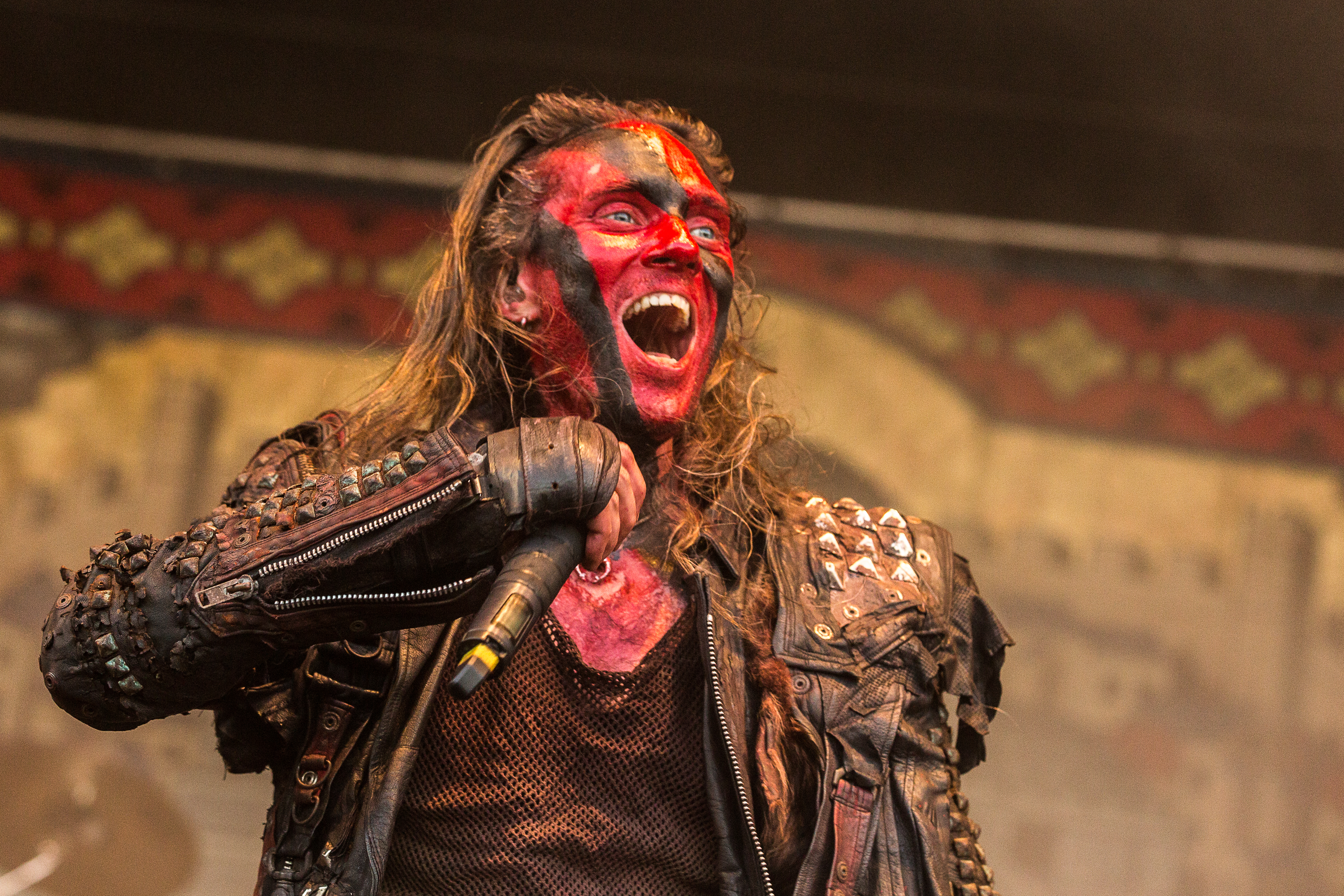
Mathias Nygård

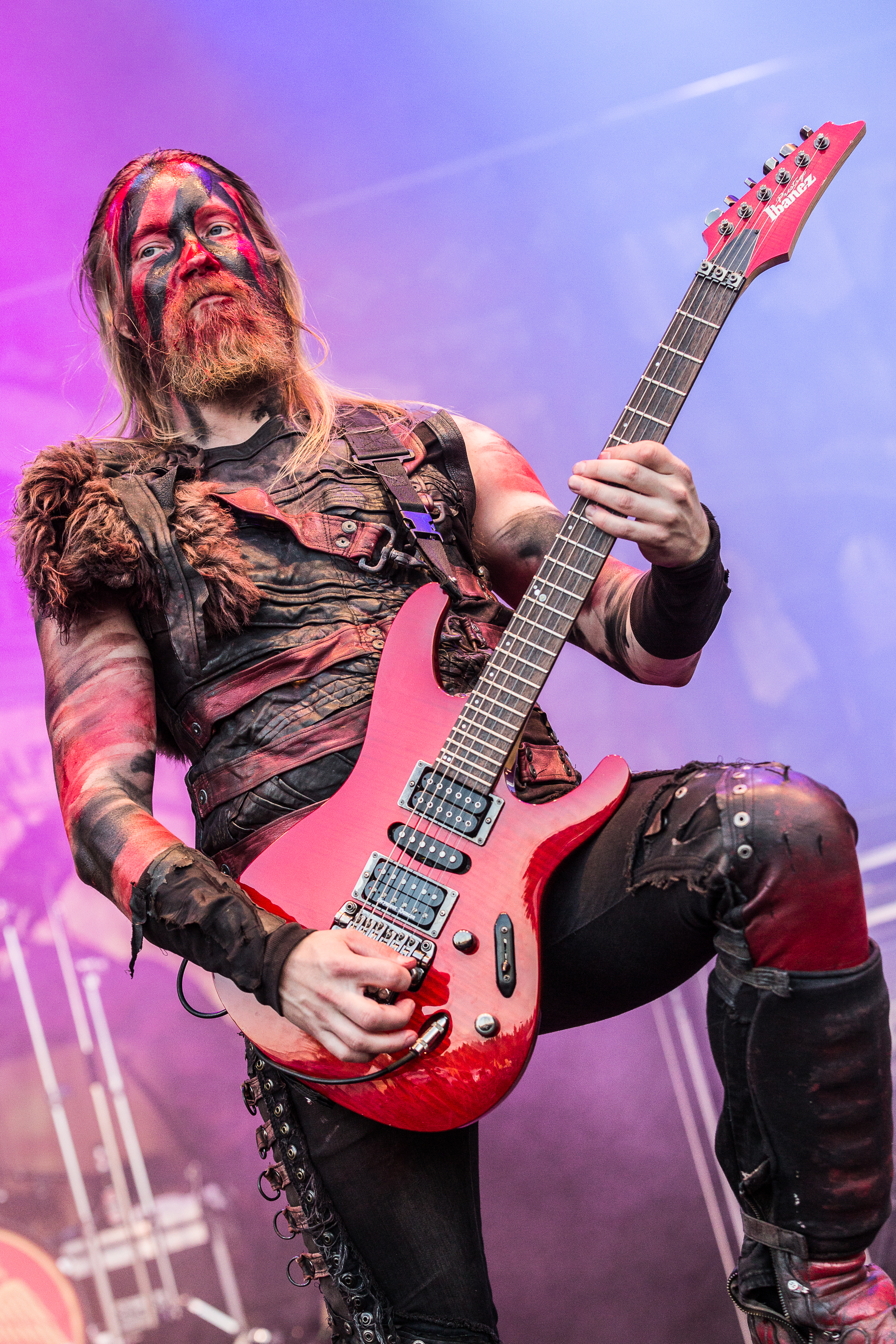
Jussi Wickström

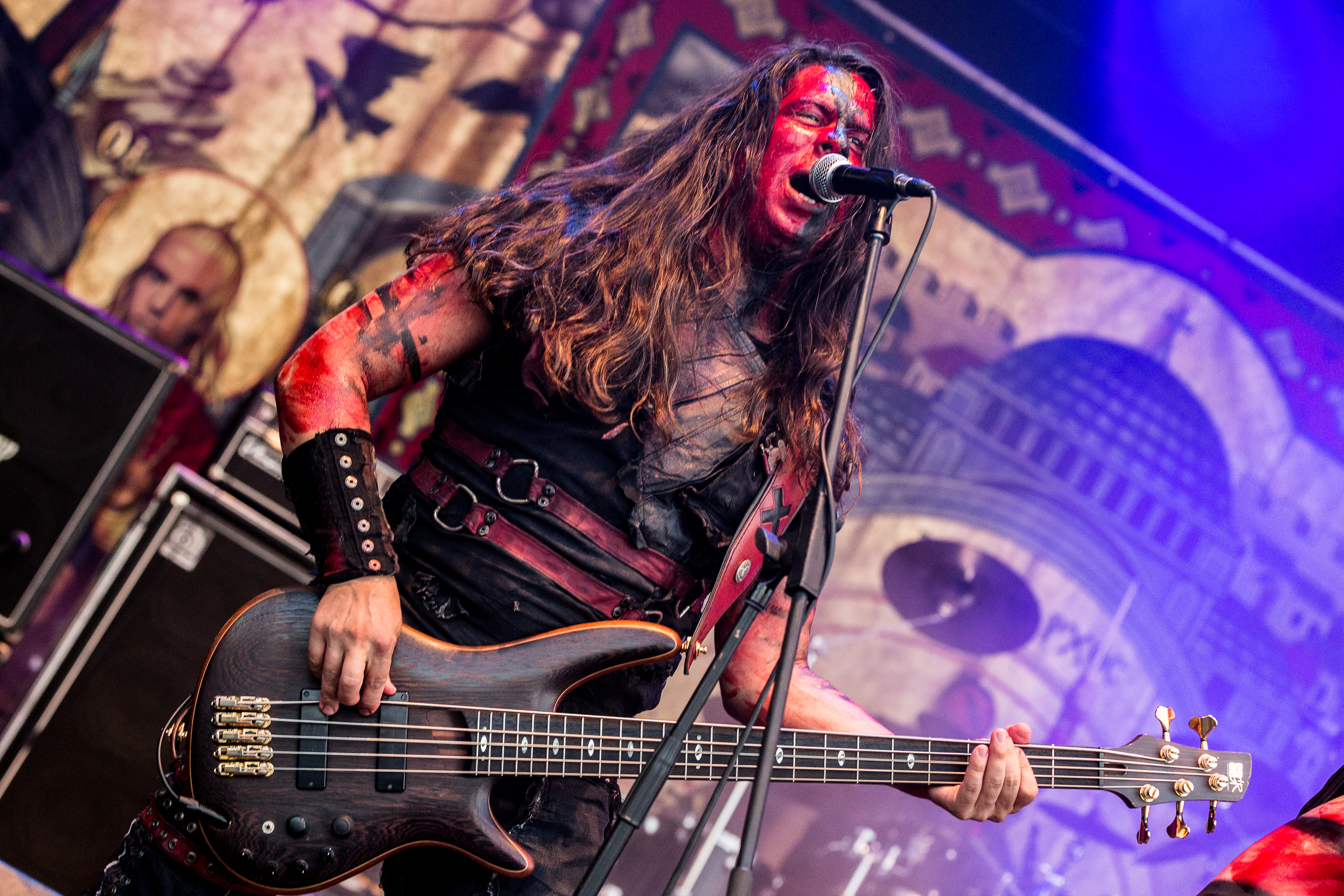
Jesper Anastasiadis

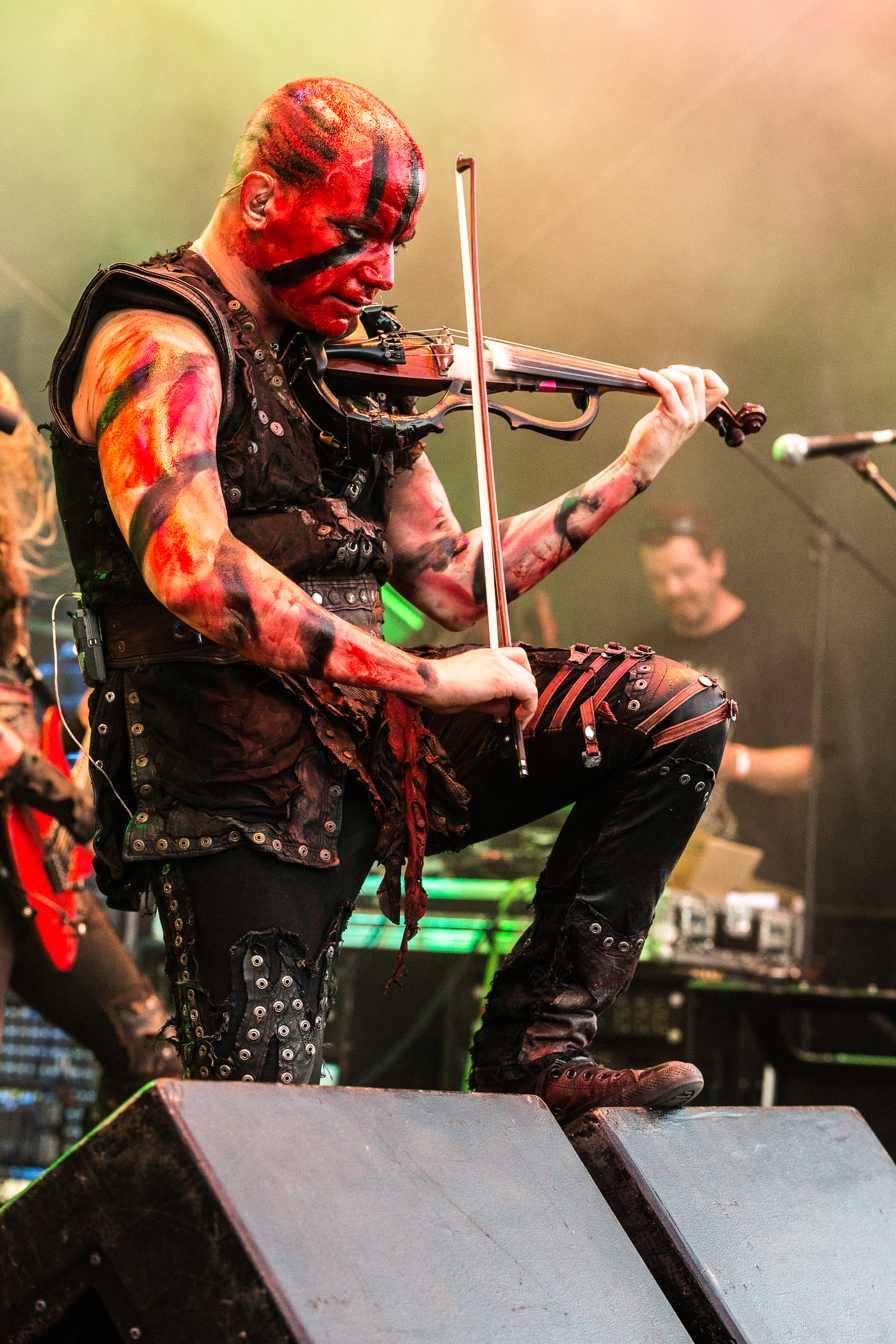
Olli Vänskä

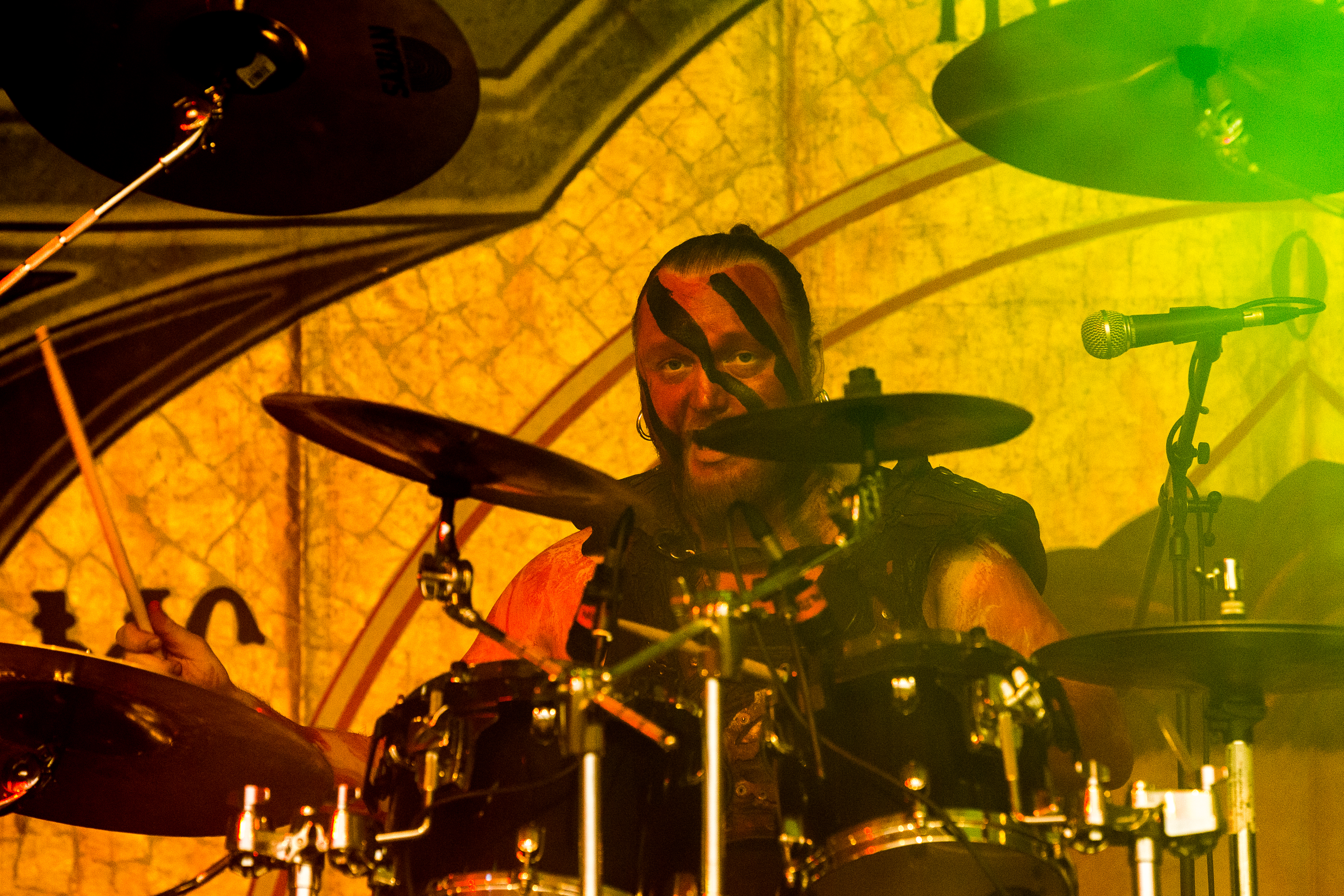
Jaakko Jakku
- Mathias "Warlord" Nygård – vocals, keyboards, percussion (1997–2022)
- Jussi Wickström – guitars, backing vocals, bass on album "Battle Metal" (1997–2022)
- Jesper Anastasiadis – bass, backing vocals (2012–2022)
- Jaakko Jakku – drums (2012–2022)
- Olli Vänskä – violin, backing vocals (2005–present)
- Janne Mäkinen – accordion, backing vocals (2005–2008)
- Antti Ventola – keyboards (1997–2007)
- Georg Laakso – guitars (ex-Cadacross) (2000–2006)
- Ari Kärkkäinen – guitars (1997–1999)
- Sami Aarnio – bass, backing vocals
- Tino Ahola – bass, backing vocals
- Mikko Törmikoski – bass, backing vocals (until 2004)
- Hannes "Hanu" Horma – bass, backing vocals (2005–2011)
- Netta Skog – accordion, backing vocals (2007–2011)
- Jukka-Pekka Miettinen – bass, backing vocals (ex-Ensiferum) (2011–2012)
- Tuomas "Tude" Lehtonen – drums (1997–2012)
- Robert Engstrand – keyboards (2011–2014)

=== Live and session ===
- Riku Ylitalo – accordion, keyboards
- Wincef Boncamper – accordion
- Antti Laurila – accordion
- Robert Engstrand – keyboards (2019–present)
- Caitlin De Ville – violin (2019)
- Meri Tadić - violin (2020)

== Discography ==
=== Albums ===
Year	Title	Chart positions		
Year	Title	FIN	GER	SWI
2004	Battle Metal	20	—	—
2007	The Varangian Way	17 (Director's Cut release)	—	—
2011	Stand Up and Fight	5	56	83
2013	Turisas2013	9	87	—

=== Singles ===
Year	Title	Chart positions
Year	Title	FIN
2007	"To Holmgard and Beyond"	12
2007	"Rasputin"	15
2010	"Supernaut"	—
2010	"Stand Up and Fight"	—
2013	"For Your Own Good"	—

=== DVDs ===
- A Finnish Summer with Turisas (2008)

=== Demos ===
- Taiston Tie – The Battle Path (1998)
- Terra Tavestorum (1999)
- The Heart of Turisas (2001)

=== Videography ===
Video	Album	Length	Year	Copyright
"Battle Metal"	Battle Metal	4:23	2008	Century Media
"Rasputin	The Varangian Way	3:56	2007	Century Media
"Stand Up and Fight"	Stand Up and Fight	5:28	2011	Century Media
"Ten More Miles"	Turisas 2013	4:17	2013	Century Media

== Literature ==
- Antje Bosselmann-Ruickbie: Heavy Metal Meets Byzantium! Contact Between Scandinavia and Byzantium in the Albums 'The Varangian Way' (2007) and 'Stand Up and Fight' (2011) by the Finnish Band Turisas. In: Menschen, Bilder, Sprache, Dinge. Wege der Kommunikation zwischen Byzanz und dem Westen. Studien zur Ausstellung "Byzanz & der Westen. 1000 vergessene Jahre", ed. by Falko Daim, Christian Gastgeber, Dominik Heher, Claudia Rapp. Byzanz zwischen Orient und Okzident 9.2, Mainz 2018, 391-419 (PDF: Antje Bosselmann-Ruickbie - Academia.edu)
- Antje Bosselmann-Ruickbie: Queen of all Cities: Echoes of Constantinople in Heavy Metal Music. In: Mittelalter und Populärkultur. Rezeption – Aneignung – Beachtungserfolge, ed. by Hans Velten, Theresa Specht. Populäres Mittelalter, Bielefeld 2024, 161-192.
- Milan K. Schaller: “We Are the Varangian Guard”. Musical Rhetoric and Literary Reference in Turisas' Varangian Way Albums. In: The Routledge Handbook of Progressive Rock, Metal, and the Literary Imagination, ed. by Chris Anderton, Lori Burns. Routledge music handbooks, London/New York 2024, 191-203.
- Ashley Walsh: “A great heathen fist from the North”. Vikings, Norse Mythology, and Medievalism in Nordic Extreme Metal Music. Master’s Thesis for Nordic Viking and Medieval Culture- ILN, UNIVERSITETET I OSLO 2013, 71-76. (PDF: DUO - digitale publikasjoner ved Universitetet i Oslo)
