= Poems of Today =

List of poetry anthologies

Poems of Today was a series of anthologies of poetry, almost all Anglo-Irish, produced by the English Association.

== Poems of Today (1915, first series) ==
A. E. - Lascelles Abercrombie - H. C. Beeching - Hilaire Belloc - Laurence Binyon - W. S. Blunt - Robert Bridges - Rupert Brooke - William Canton - P. R. Chalmers - G. K. Chesterton - Mary E. Coleridge - Padraic Colum - Frances Cornford - A. S. Cripps - John Davidson - W. H. Davies - Walter De la Mare - John Drinkwater - J. E. Flecker - Edmund Gosse - Gerald Gould - Ralph Hodgson - Laurence Housman - Lionel Johnson - Rudyard Kipling - Shane Leslie - Rose Macaulay - J. W. Mackail - John Masefield - George Meredith - Alice Meynell - T. Sturge Moore - Sir Henry Newbolt - J. B. B. Nichols - Alfred Noyes - Sir A. T. Quiller-Couch - Ernest Radford - Ada Smith - R. L. Stevenson - Arthur Symons - Francis Thompson - Herbert Trench - Katharine Tynan - William Watson - Margaret L. Woods - W. B. Yeats

== Poems of Today (1922, second series) ==
A. E. - Herbert Asquith - Maurice Baring - Hilaire Belloc - Laurence Binyon - Edmund Blunden - F. S. Boas - Eva Gore-Booth - Gordon Bottomley - F. W. Bourdillon - Robert Bridges - Rupert Brooke - T. E. Brown - A. H. Bullen - E. K. Chambers - G. K. Chesterton - Padraic Colum - The Marquess of Crewe - Walter De la Mare - Geoffrey Dearmer - John Drinkwater - V. L. Edminson - Michael Field - J. E. Flecker - John Freeman - Margaret C. Furse - John Galsworthy - Wilfrid Wilson Gibson - Julian Grenfell - Thomas Hardy - F. W. Harvey - Ralph Hodgson - W. N. Hodgson - A. E. Housman - Aldous Huxley - Violet Jacob - Francis Ledwidge - Winifred M. Letts - Sidney Royse Lysaght - Rose Macaulay - Alasdair MacGregor - E. A. Mackintosh - John Masefield - Beatrice Mayor - Charlotte Mew - Alice Meynell - Harold Monro - T. Sturge Moore - F. W. Moorman - Gilbert Murray - Sir Henry Newbolt - Robert Nichols - Madeleine Nightingale - Moira O'Neill - Seumas O'Sullivan - Joseph M. Plunkett - Madeleine Caron Rock - Lady Margaret Sackville - Siegfried Sassoon - Edward Shanks - Charles Hamilton Sorley - Sir Cecil Spring Rice - James Stephens - Edward Tennant - Edward Thomas - Francis Thompson - Herbert Trench - W. J. Turner - Evelyn Underhill - Lucy Whitmell - T. P. Cameron Wilson - W. B. Yeats

== Poems of Today (1938, third series) ==
Lascelles Abercrombie - J. Redwood Anderson - W. H. Auden - George Barker - Julian Bell - Laurence Binyon - Edmund Blunden - Cicely Boas - Guy Boas - Lilian Bowes Lyon - A. C. Boyd - Robert Bridges - Hilton Brown - Roy Campbell - G. M. Cookson - Frances Cornford - W. H. Davies - Cecil Day-Lewis - Walter De la Mare - John Drinkwater - Clifford Dyment - Richard Eberhart - Robin Flower - John Freeman - John Gawsworth - Wilfrid Gibson - Lord Gorell - C. L. Graves - I. Sutherland Groom - Thomas Hardy - Phyllis Hartnoll - Christopher Hassall - A. P. Herbert - Gerard Manley Hopkins - E. V. Knox - D. H. Lawrence - John Lehmann - F. L. Lucas - Louis MacNeice - Charles Madge - John Masefield - Huw Menai - E. H. W. Meyerstein - Harold Monro - Edwin Muir - Seán O'Casey - Wilfred Owen - Herbert E. Palmer - Ruth Pitter - Frederic Prokosch - John Pudney - Herbert Read - James Reeves - Michael Roberts - V. Sackville-West - Siegfried Sassoon - Geoffrey Scott - Edith Sitwell - Osbert Sitwell - Stephen Spender - L. A. G. Strong - Jan Struther - Dorothy Margaret Stuart - A. S. J. Tessimond - Dylan Thomas - W. J. Turner - James Walker - Rex Warner - Dorothy Wellesley - Laurence Whistler - Humbert Wolfe - W. B. Yeats - Andrew Young

== Poems of Today (1951, fourth series) ==
C. Colleer Abbott - John Arlott - W. H. Auden - George Barker - John Bayliss - Frances Bellerby - John Betjeman - Laurence Binyon - Edmund Blunden - Ronald Bottrall - Lilian Bowes Lyon - C. W. Brodribb - Gerald Bullett - Guy Butler - John Buxton - Roy Campbell - Demetrios Capetanakis - Joyce Cary - Richard Church - Alex Comfort - R. N. Currey - W. H. Davies - Walter De La Mare - Patric Dickinson - Keith Douglas - Adam Drinan - Clifford Dyment - T. S. Eliot - Arundell Esdaile - G. S. Fraser - Roy Fuller - Jill Furse - H. W. Garrod - Viola Garvin - David Gascoyne - Wilfrid Gibson - O. St. J. Gogarty - Helen Granville-Barker - Robert Graves - Geoffrey Grigson - Stephen Haggard - J. C. Hall - G. Rostrevor Hamilton - Christopher Hassall - John Heath-Stubbs - J. F. Hendry - Charles Hepburn - F. R. Higgins - Ralph Hodgson - Seán Jennett - Frank Kendon - Sidney Keyes - James Kirkup - Laurie Lee - John Lehmann - Alun Lewis - C. Day-Lewis - C. S. Lewis - Emanuel Litvinoff - Sylvia Lynd - Donagh MacDonagh - Louis MacNeice - John Masefield - E. H. W. Meyerstein - Francis Meynell - Edwin Muir - Norman Nicholson - Herbert Palmer - V. de Sola Pinto - Ruth Pitter - William Plomer - F. T. Prince - John Pudney - Kathleen Raine - Herbert Read - Henry Reed - Alexander Reid - Anne Ridler - W. R. Rodgers - Alan Rook - A. L. Rowse - V. Sackville-West - Siegfried Sassoon - E. J. Scovell - Ian Serraillier - John Short - Edith Sitwell - Osbert Sitwell - Martyn Skinner - Stevie Smith - Stanley Snaith - Helen Spalding - Stephen Spender - James Stephens - L. A. G. Strong - Hal Summers - A. S. J. Tessimond - Dylan Thomas - Terence Tiller - Henry Treece - R. C. Trevelyan - W. J. Turner - John Waller - Rex Warner - Vernon Watkins - Dorothy Wellesley - Laurence Whistler - W. B. Yeats - Andrew Young

== See also ==
- 1915 in poetry
- 1922 in poetry
- 1938 in poetry
- 1951 in poetry
