= The Oxford Book of Twentieth Century English Verse =

- First edition
- Author: Philip Larkin
- Cover artist: Stanley Spencer by The Resurrection of Soldiers
- Language: English
- Genre: Poetry
- Publisher: Oxford University Press
- Publication date: 1973
- Publication place: United Kingdom
- OCLC: 637331
- Dewey Decimal: 821/.9/108
- LC Class: PR1225 .L3

The Oxford Book of Twentieth Century English Verse is a poetry anthology edited by Philip Larkin. It was published in 1973 by Oxford University Press with ISBN 0-19-812137-7. Larkin writes in the short preface that the selection is wide rather than deep; and also notes that for the post-1914 period it is more a collection of poems, than of poets. The remit was limited by him to poets with a period of residence in the British Isles. Larkin's generous selection of Thomas Hardy's poems has been noted for its influence on Hardy's later reputation. On the other hand, he was criticized, notably by Donald Davie, for his inclusion of "pop" poets such as Brian Patten. The volume contains works by 207 poets.

== Contributing poets ==
- Allison, Drummond
- Allott, Kenneth
- Amis, Kingsley
- Asquith, Herbert
- Auden, W. H.
- Bantock, Gavin
- Barker, George
- Barton, Joan
- Beer, Patricia
- Beerbohm, Max
- Bell, Martin
- Belloc, Hilaire
- Bennett, Arnold
- Benson, Stella
- Betjeman, John
- Binyon, Laurence
- Blackburn, Thomas
- Blunden, Edmund
- Blunt, Wilfrid Scawen
- Lyon, Lilian Bowes
- Bridges, Robert
- Brooke, Rupert
- Brownjohn, Alan
- Bunting, Basil
- Cameron, Norman
- Campbell, Joseph
- Campbell, Roy
- Cannan, May Wedderburn
- Caudwell, Christopher
- Causley, Charles
- Chesterton, G. K.
- Church, Richard
- Clarke, Austin
- Cole, Barry
- Cole, G. D. H.
- Colum, Padraic
- Comfort, Alex
- Connor, Tony
- Conquest, Robert
- Cornford, Frances
- Coward, Noël
- Currey, R. N.
- Davidson, John
- Davie, Donald
- Davies, Idris
- Davies, W. H.
- Day-Lewis, Cecil
- Dehn, Paul
- de la Mare, Walter
- Douglas, Keith
- Drinkwater, John
- Dunn, Douglas
- Durrell, Lawrence
- Dyment, Clifford
- Eliot, T. S.
- Ellis, Colin
- Empson, William
- Enright, D. J.
- Ewart, Gavin
- Falkner, John Meade
- Flecker, James Elroy
- Flint, F. S.
- Frankau, Gilbert
- Fraser, G. S.
- Fuller, Roy
- Garioch, Robert
- Gascoyne, David
- Gibson, Wilfrid
- Gittings, Robert
- Gogarty, Oliver St. John
- Gould, Gerald
- Graham, W. S.
- Gransden, K. W.
- Graves, Robert
- Green F. Pratt
- Grenfell, Julian
- Grigson, Geoffrey
- Gunn, Thom
- Gurney, Ivor
- Haldane, J. B. S.
- Hamburger, Michael
- Hardy, Thomas
- Harvey, F. W.
- Hassall, Christopher
- Heath-Stubbs, John
- Henri, Adrian
- Herbert, A. P.
- John Hewitt
- Higgins, Brian
- Higgins, F. R.
- Hill, Geoffrey
- Hobsbaum, Philip
- Hodgson, Ralph
- Holbrook, David
- Holden, Molly
- Housman, A. E.
- Hughes, Ted
- Hulme, T. E.
- Iremonger, Valentin
- Isherwood, Christopher
- Ivens, Michael
- Jennings, Elizabeth
- Joseph, Jenny
- Joyce, James
- Kavanagh, P. J.
- Kavanagh, Patrick
- Keyes, Sidney
- Kinsella, Thomas
- Kipling, Rudyard
- Kirkup, James
- Larkin, Philip
- Lawrence, D. H.
- Lehmann, John
- Lerner, Lawrence
- Lewis, Alun
- Lewis, C. S.
- Lewis, Wyndham
- Logue, Christopher
- Lowry, Malcolm
- Lucie-Smith, Edward
- MacBeth, George
- MacCaig, Norman
- MacDiarmid, Hugh
- MacDonagh, Donagh
- MacNeice, Louis
- Madge, Charles
- Masefield, John
- McGough, Roger
- Mew, Charlotte
- Meynell, Alice
- Michie, James
- Miles, Susan
- Mitchell, Adrian
- Mitchell, Matthew
- Monro, Harold
- T. Sturge Moore
- Muir, Edwin
- E. Nesbit
- Newbolt, Henry
- Noyes, Alfred
- Philip O'Connor
- Moira O'Neill
- Orwell, George
- Owen, Wilfred
- Herbert Palmer
- Patten, Brian
- Phillpotts, Eden
- Pitter, Ruth
- Plomer, William
- Popham, Hugh
- Porter, Peter
- Powys, John Cowper
- Prince, F. T.
- Pudney, John
- Raine, Kathleen
- Read, Herbert
- Redgrove, Peter
- Reed, Henry
- Reeves, James
- Rendall, Robert
- Rickword, Edgell
- Roberts, Michael
- Rosenberg, Isaac
- Ross, Alan
- Rowse, A. L.
- Sackville-West, Vita
- Sagittarius (Olga Katzin Miller)
- Sassoon, Siegfried
- Scannell, Vernon
- Scovell, E. J.
- Seymour-Smith, Martin
- Shanks, Edward
- Silkin, Jon
- Sillitoe, Alan
- Sisson, C. H.
- Sitwell, Edith
- Sitwell, Osbert
- Smith, Iain Crichton
- Smith, Stevie
- Spencer, Bernard
- Spender, Stephen
- Squire, J. C.
- Stephens, James
- Strong, L. A. G.
- Stuart, Muriel
- Summers, Hal
- Synge, J. M.
- Tessimond, A. S. J.
- Thomas, Dylan
- Thomas, R. S.
- Thwaite, Anthony
- Tomlinson, Charles
- Tonks, Rosemary
- Wain, John
- Walcott, Derek
- Waley, Arthur
- Watkins, Vernon
- Wellesley, Dorothy
- Wickham, Anna
- Williams, Hugo
- Wolfe, Humbert
- Wordsworth, Elizabeth
- Yeats, W. B.
- Young, Andrew
- Young, Francis Brett
