= Herbert Palmer =

Herbert Palmer may refer to:

- Herbert Palmer (Puritan) (1601–1647), Puritan writer
- Herbert James Palmer (1851–1939), Canadian politician, Premier of Prince Edward Island
- Herbert Richmond Palmer (1877–1958), British colonial governor
- Herbert Edward Palmer (1880–1961), English poet
- Herbert Sidney Palmer (1881-1970), Canadian painter

== See also ==
- George Herbert Palmer (1842–1933), American educator
