= Ada Smith (poet) =

English poet

Ada Elizabeth Smith (1875–1898) was an English poet. She is best known for her poem In City Lights, an anthology piece.

== John Smith & Son of Haltwhistle ==
Ada Smith was from Haltwhistle, Northumberland. John Smith, her grandfather, founded a varnish factory in Haltwhistle, in 1850. He lived at South Vale, now a Grade II listed building in Haltwhistle, and was known as founder of local Sunday schools around 1830. He married Mary Hood Haggie, daughter of David Haggie of Gateshead. His son Robert married in 1866 Mary Ann Wood, daughter of William Bolton Wood of Lower Broughton, his earlier wife Martha Cook of Peckham Rye having died in 1860; he died in 1881, at Greystone Dale (or Greystonedale).

In 1888, Frank Paul Smith of Greystonedale, Robert's son, of the John Smith & Son varnish business, was involved in bankruptcy proceedings. He was adjudicated bankrupt on 7 May that year at Carlisle County Court. The proceedings showed that he had taken over the business, burdened by family debt, in 1883, and had brought new money in from his aunt Miss Cook. The family business was put up for sale in July of that year. He died in 1935, by which time his son Douglas was a partner in the successor business Smith & Walton at Haltwhistle.

== Life ==
Ada Smith was born on 25 March 1875, the fourth daughter of Robert Smith of Haltwhistle. Her mother Mary Ann died 1885, in Southport. In 1887, the family went to London for a year, returning north then to Haydon Bridge. In 1888, at age 13 or 14, she first published a poem. After about 18 months at Haydon Bridge, she with sisters moved to Hexham.

At age 18, Smith attended a school in Paris for a year. She then took a position as secretary to the poet Robinson Kay Leather, at Ringmore in Devon; he was married to Amelia Hensley Foster, an artist under the names Amy H. Foster or Mrs. R. K. Leather. There she met Norman Gale, who collaborated with Leather on an 1894 book of verse.

Leather died in mid-1895, and Smith then spent a period that year in Dresden. Via Mecklenburg, she moved on to Vienna, where she was based until mid-1897, supporting herself by giving English lessons.

Moving to London, Smith worked as a typist, but fell ill.

== Death ==
Ada Smith died in Belle Grove Terrace, Newcastle upon Tyne, on 7 December 1898. She was buried at St John Lee Church, Hexham. The funeral on 10 December was attended by five of her unmarried sisters, including Olive Smith, and three of her brothers, Frank, Norman and Harold. Also present were the Newcastle journalists J. L. Garvin and Edwin Wilcox (died 1947). The obituary in The Academy by "J. L. G." was written by Garvin.

== Works ==
In City Streets was first published in The Quartier Latin. It was reprinted in the 1898 anthology London in Song compiled by Wilfred Whitten. A setting to music by Graham Peel appeared in 1924. That year, a newspaper piece "Derwent Stories" stated that it referred in the first line ("Yonder is the heather") to Blanchland Fell or Moor, south of Hexham and north of Blanchland. Appearing in Poems of To-day, first series in 1915, as No. 30, it remained in print in frequent impressions until at least 1942.

Smith was a prolific writer, who burned much of what she had written. Only a small proportion of what she left was finished work. The Collected Poems of Ada Elizabeth Smith was published in 1950 (London, Mitre Press).

Initially she published as "Elizabeth Smith". Her first poem in print was in The Christian Million, a newspaper founded by William Tarver, a Primitive Methodist. When living in Hexham, she began regular contributions, still as Elizabeth Smith, to the Newcastle Weekly Chronicle.
