= Thomas Moult =

Thomas Moult (1893–1974) was a versatile English journalist and writer, and one of the Georgian poets. He is known for his annual anthologies Best Poems of the Year, 1922 to 1943, which were popular verse selections taken from periodicals on both sides of the Atlantic. His poem 'Truly He Hath A Sweet Bed' from Down Here the Hawthorn was set to music for chorus and orchestra by Cyril Rootham (as Brown Earth, 1921–2).

== Life ==
He was born in Derbyshire, to Jewish parents. He wrote much newspaper criticism, on music and drama and as a book reviewer; and on sport in the popular press.

He founded a magazine, Voices, for young writers, in 1919, publishing Sherwood Anderson, A. E. Coppard, Louis Golding, F. V. Branford, and Neville Cardus. It has been described as "eminently uncontroversial".

From 1952 to 1962 he was president of the Poetry Society and chairman of the editorial board of Poetry Review.

== Family ==
Moult's daughter Joy was the first wife of psychologist Oliver Zangwill.

== Works ==
- Snow over Elden (1920) novel
- Down Here the Hawthorn (1921) poems
- Cenotaph: A Book of Remembrance in Poetry and Prose for November the Eleventh (1923) editor
- The Comely Lass (1923) novel
- Forty Years in My Bookshop by Walter T. Spencer (1927) editor
- Barrie (1928) criticism
- Derbyshire Prose and Verse (1929) editor
- Saturday Night (1931) novel
- Sally Go Round the Moon (1931)
- Playing for England by Jack Hobbs (1931) editor
- Mary Webb: Her Life and Work (1932)
- W. H. Davies (1933)
- Willow Pattern (1934) cricket poems
- Bat and Ball (1935) cricket anthology

== The Best Poems of 1931 ==
Poets included were:

A. E. - Conrad Aiken - Margaret Emerson Bailey - T. O. Beachcroft - William Rose Benét - Anthony Bertram - Edmund Blunden - Kay Boyle - Nancy Campbell - Thomas Caldecott Chubb - Elizabeth Coatsworth - Robert P. Tristram Coffin - Jane Culver - W. H. Davies - John Gould Fletcher - John Galsworthy - Viola Gerard Garvin - Stella Gibbons - Wilfrid Gibson - G. Rostrevor Hamilton - Ernest Hartsock - F. R. Higgins - John Lee Higgins - Robert Hillyer - Thomas Hornsby Ferril - Helen Hoyt - Julian Huxley - Leslie Nelson Jennings - Geoffrey Johnson - Frank Kendon - Stanley Kimmel - Alfred Kreymborg - Ruth Lechlitner - Marie Luhrs - Sylvia Lynd - Alister Mackenzie - E. H. W. Meyerstein - Harold Monro - Virginia Moore - David Morton - Edwin Muir - Robert Nichols - Jessica Nelson North - Alfred Noyes - Doris Pailthorpe - Herbert E. Palmer - Dorothy Parker - Laurence Powys - Frederic Prokosch - Lizette Woodworth Reese - Sarah-Elizabeth Rodger - Robert L. Roe - James Rorty - A. Wolseley Russell - Lady Margaret Sackville - Anderson M. Scruggs - Leonora Speyer - J. C. Squire - L. Steni - L. A. G. Strong - Sara Teasdale - Katharine Tynan - A. R. Ubsdell - Marie de L. Welch - John Hall Wheelock - Mary Brent Whiteside - Humbert Wolfe - Barbara Young
