= Joan Barton =

Joan Barton may refer to:

- Joan Barton (poet)
- Joan Barton (actress)
