= Louis Rhead =

American artist

Louis John Rhead
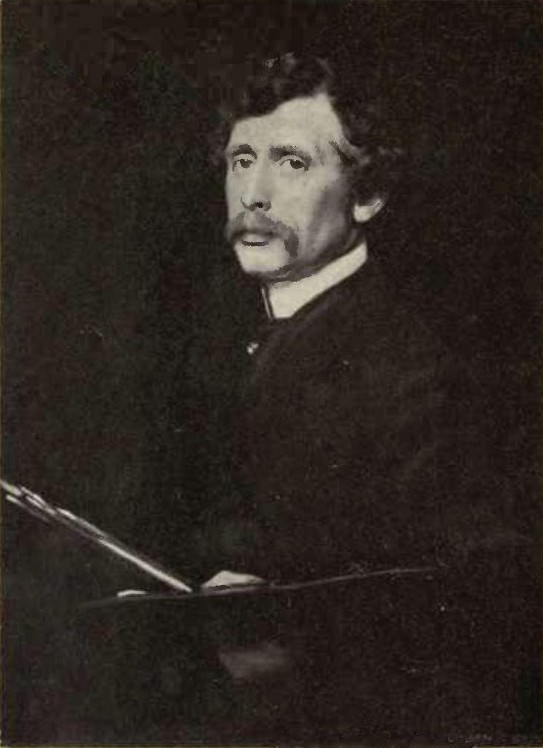
- Louis Rhead circa 1907
- Born: November 6, 1857; Etruria, Staffordshire, England
- Died: July 29, 1926 (aged 68); Amityville, Long Island, U.S.
- Education: National Art Training School
- Known for: Decorative arts, illustrations

Louis John Rhead (November 6, 1857 – July 29, 1926) was an English-born American artist, illustrator, author and angler who was born in Etruria, Staffordshire, England. He emigrated to the United States at the age of twenty-four.

== Early life ==
The Rhead family had operated and worked in the Staffordshire Potteries for at least three generations. Louis' father George W. Rhead worked in the pottery industry and was a highly respected gilder and ceramic artist. In the 1870s, George Rhead taught art and design in Staffordshire schools. He founded Fenton School of Art.

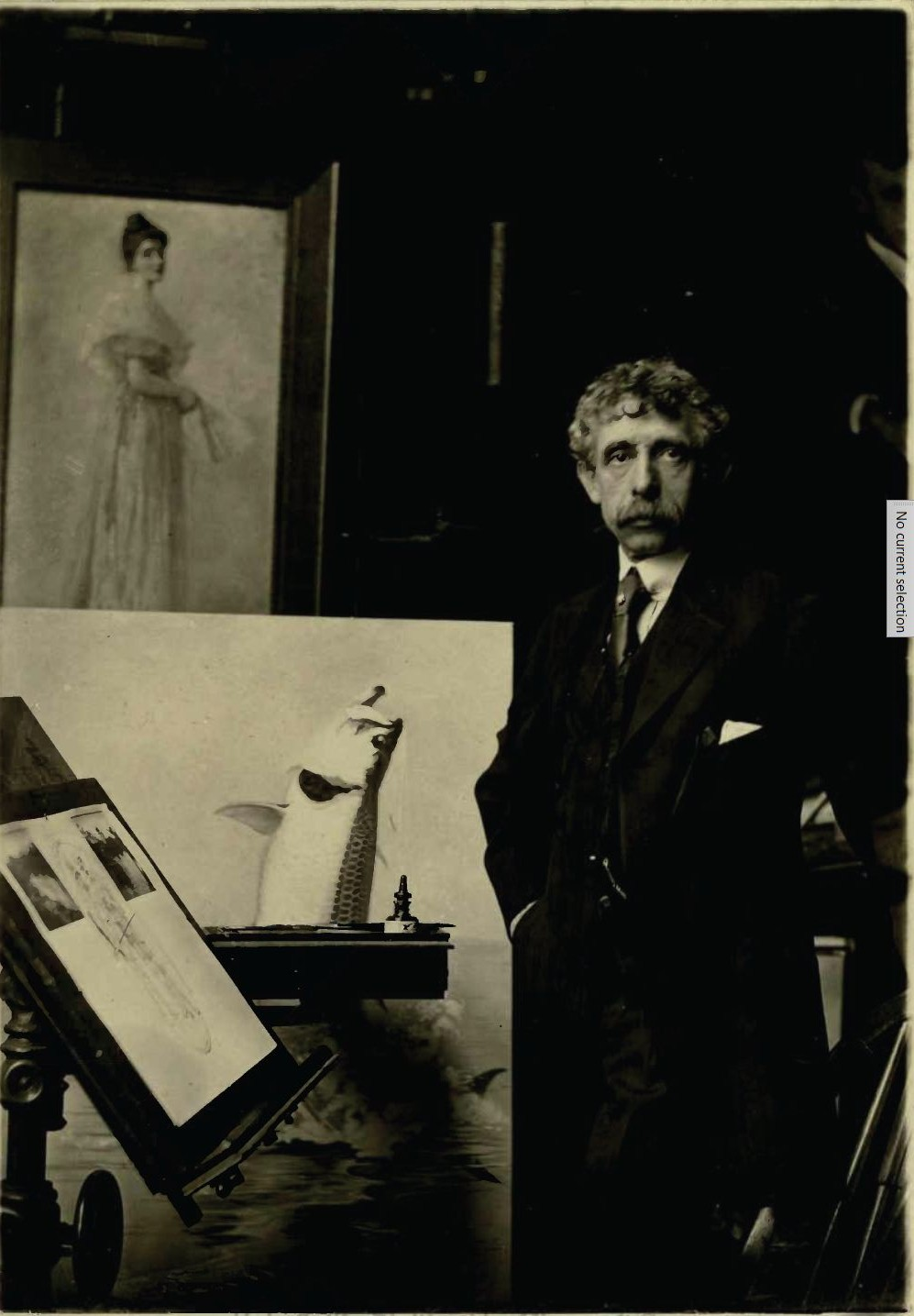
Rhead in his studio circa 1920

Louis and all his siblings attended their father's art classes and worked in the potteries as children. His brothers Frederick Alfred Rhead and George Woolliscroft Rhead Jr. (1855–1920) were also artistic, and Louis, later in his career, sometimes collaborated with them, for example in book-illustration projects. Louis was also the uncle of the potters Charlotte Rhead and Frederick Hurten Rhead.

Because Louis demonstrated exceptional talent, when he was thirteen in 1872, his father sent him to study in Paris, France with artist Gustave Boulanger. After three years in Paris, Louis Rhead returned to work in the potteries as a ceramic artist at Minton and later at Wedgwood. In 1879 he gained a scholarship at the National Art Training School, South Kensington, London. After graduating from South Kensington in 1881, Louis Rhead worked briefly for Wedgwood and worked for the London publisher Cassell.

== U.S. career ==
In 1883 at the age of twenty-four, Louis Rhead was offered a position as Art Director for the U.S. publishing firm of D. Appleton in New York City. He accepted and emigrated to the U.S. in the fall of 1883. In 1884 he married Catherine Bogart Yates, thus becoming an American citizen. Louis and Catherine lived in Flatbush, Brooklyn overlooking Prospect Park for forty years.

In the early 1890s, Rhead became a prominent poster artist and was heavily influenced by the work of Swiss artist Eugène Grasset. During the poster craze of the early 1890s, Rhead's poster art appeared regularly in Harper's Bazaar, Harper's Magazine, St. Nicolas, Century Magazine, Ladies Home Journal and Scribner's Magazine. An exhibition of his work was organized by the Salon des Cent in Paris. Three of his posters were published in Les Maîtres de l'Affiche. In 1895 he won a Gold Medal for Best American Poster Design at the first International Poster Show in Boston.

By the late 1890s, the popularity of poster art declined, and Rhead turned his skills to book illustration. Between 1902 and his death in 1926, Rhead illustrated numerous children's books published by Harpers and others. Most notable among these were editions of: Robin Hood, The Swiss Family Robinson, Robinson Crusoe, The Deerslayer, Treasure Island, Kidnapped and Heidi.

== Angling ==
Rhead was an avid fly fisher and by his own account started fishing for trout in the U.S. sometime between 1888 and 1890. In 1901 he became interested in angling art and much of his later published works deal with fishing and fly fishing. Rhead was also a tackle dealer and sold his own line of artificial flies. His most famous and celebrated work is American Trout-Stream Insects (1916). At the time of its publication this was one of the first and most comprehensive studies of stream entomology ever published in America.

Paul Schullery in American Fly Fishing—A History (1987) says this about Rhead:

Louis Rhead was one of the most creative, fresh-thinking, and stimulating of American fly-fishing writers, a man of extraordinary gifts. ... his major effort was American Trout Stream Insects, a book based on several years of trout fishing in the Catskills.

== Death ==
Louis Rhead's death was somewhat unusual. He died from a heart attack at his retirement home in Amityville, Long Island. A portion of his obituary in The New York Times, Friday July 30, 1926:

LOUIS RHEAD, ARTIST AND ANGLER, DEAD. Exhausted Recently by Long Struggle In Capturing a 30-pound Turtle.

... About two weeks ago Mr. Rhead set out to catch a turtle weighing thirty pounds which had been devastating trout ponds on his place, Seven Oaks. After the turtle was hooked, it put up a fight for more than half an hour. Although Mr. Rhead was successful in the end, he became exhausted. A short time later he suffered from his first attack of heart disease. Yesterday's was his second.

== Exhibition ==
Bernard Bumpus (1921–2004) was the leading authority on the Rhead family. In the 1980s Bumpus curated an exhibition Rhead Artists and Potters at the Geffrye Museum in London, which mainly featured works of art by the Rhead family, but also included examples of Louis Rhead's flies. It toured several UK Museums including the Potteries Museum & Art Gallery in Staffordshire. Bumpus hoped to take a version of the exhibition to the US, but, despite American interest in the Rhead family, this project foundered.

== Gallery ==
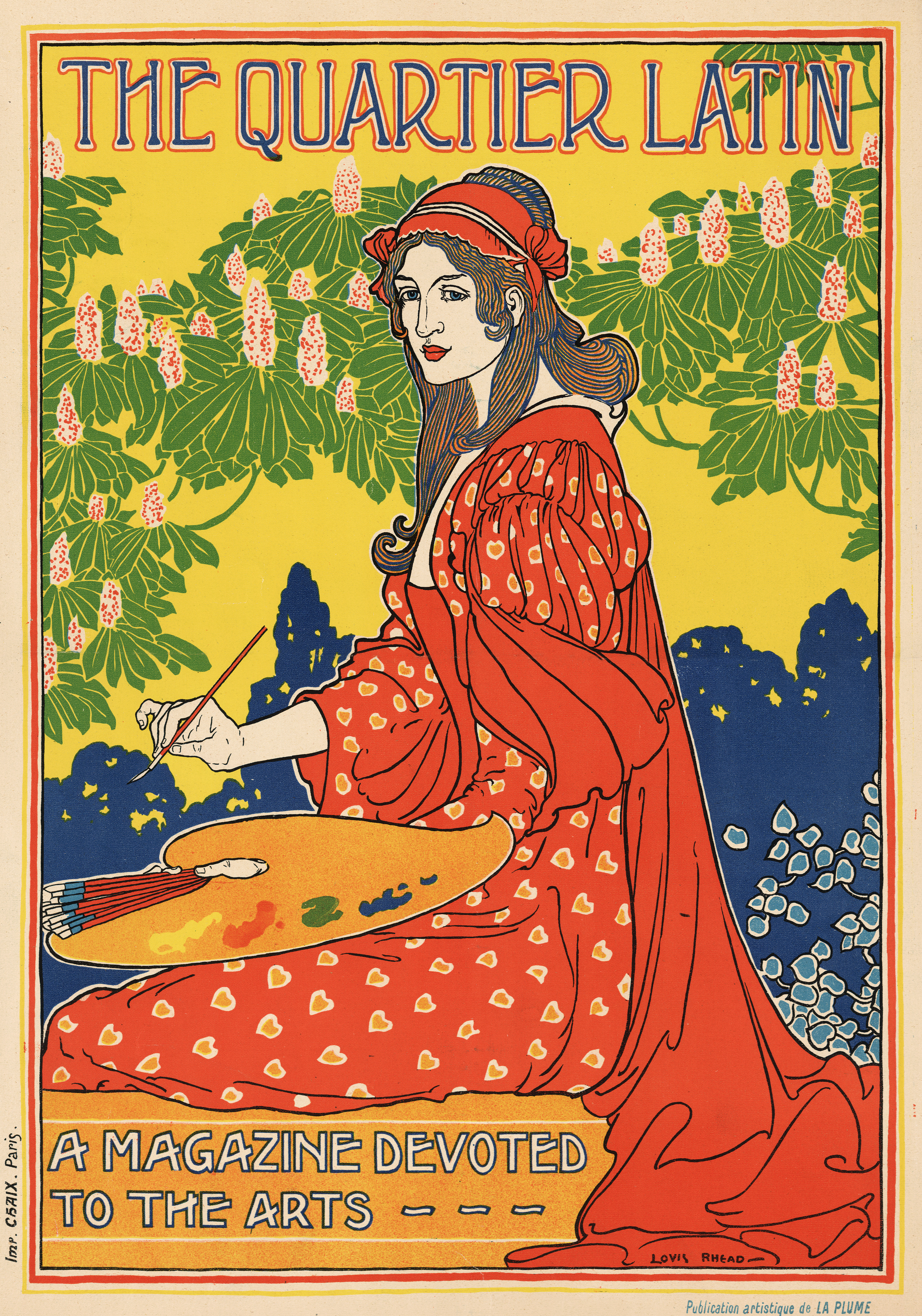
The Quartier Latin: a magazine devoted to the arts. Advertising poster c. 1895

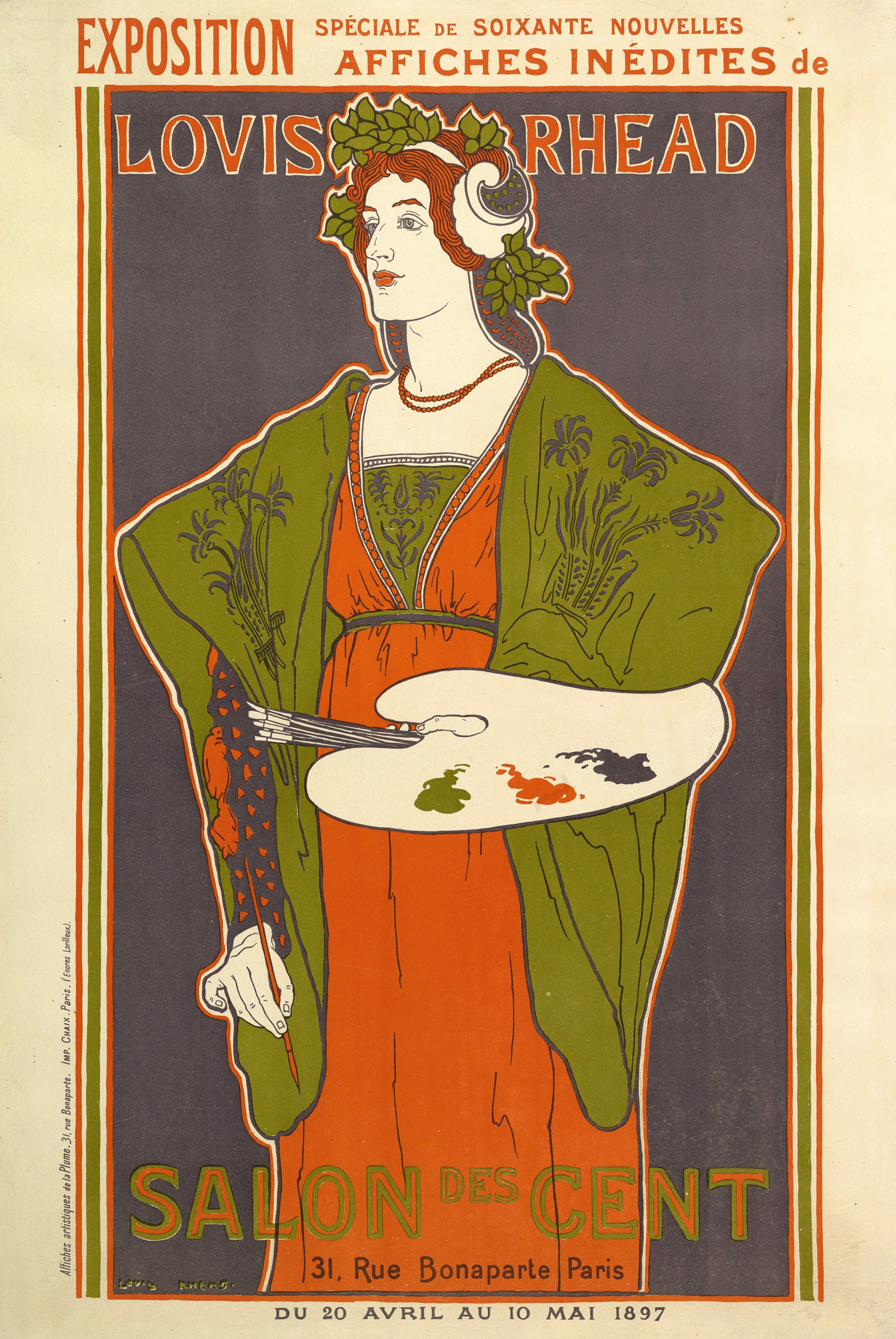
Rhead exhibition in Salon des Cent, 1897

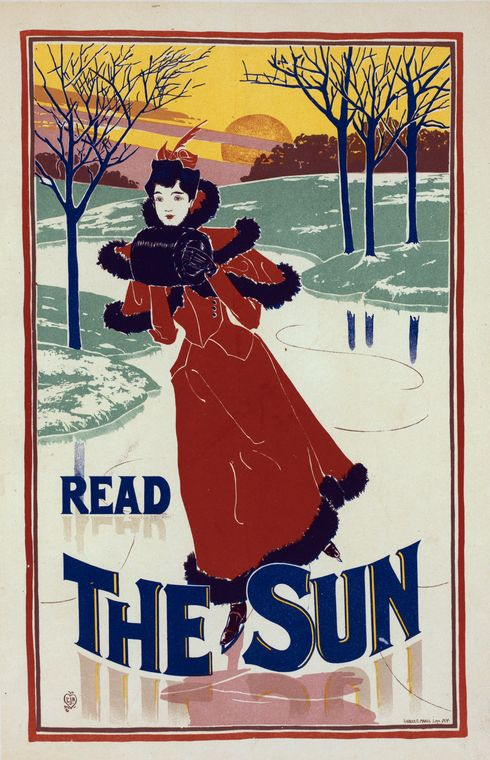
Read The Sun, 1900

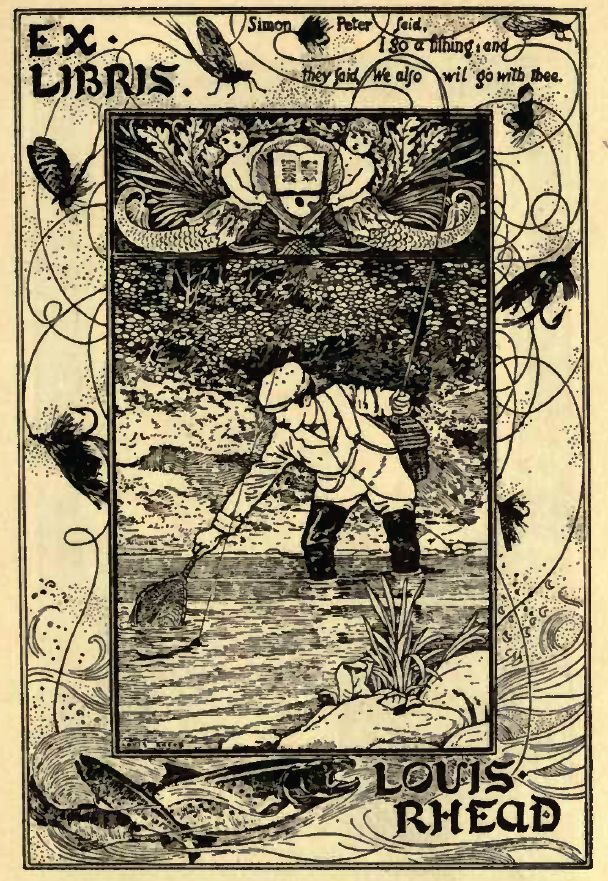
"Fly fishing", a book-plate by Louis Rhead

== Bibliography ==
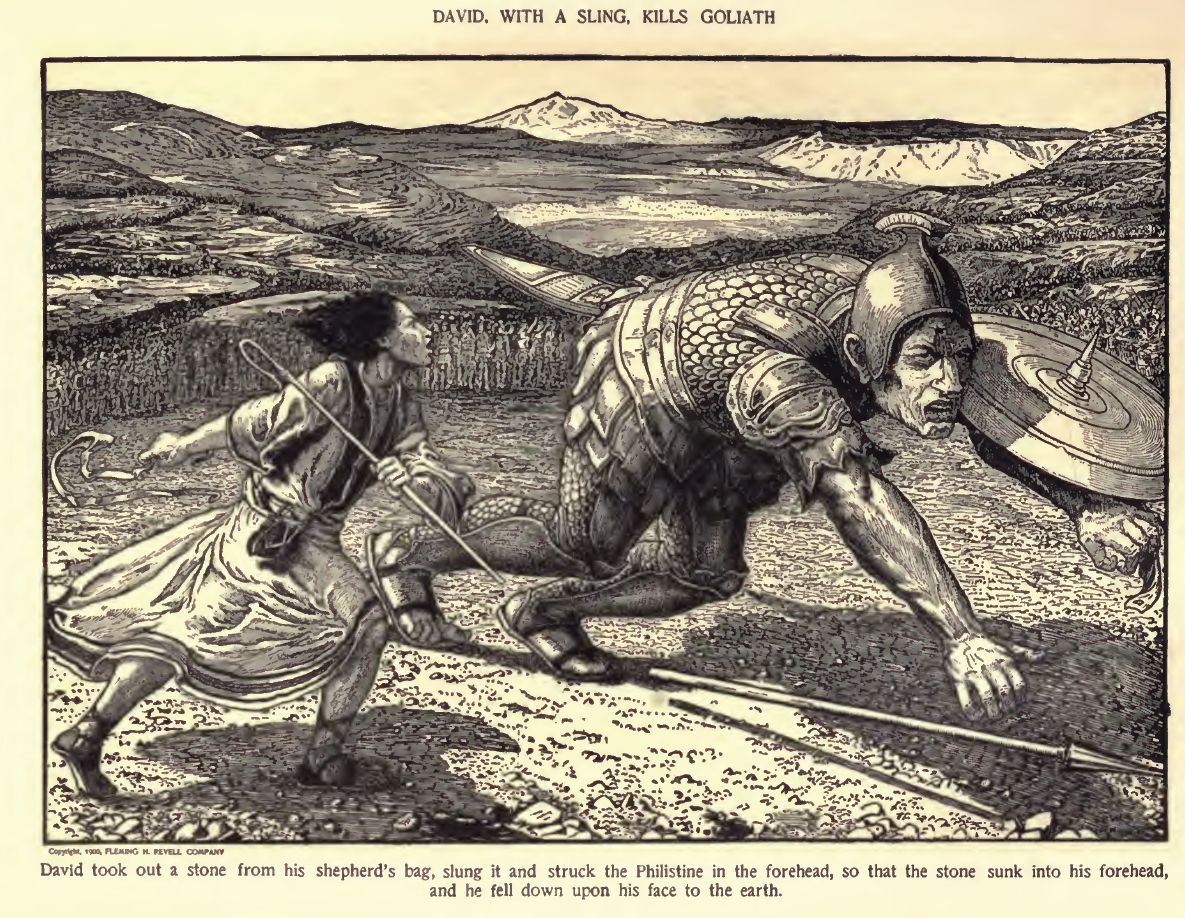
David and Goliath from The Psalms of David

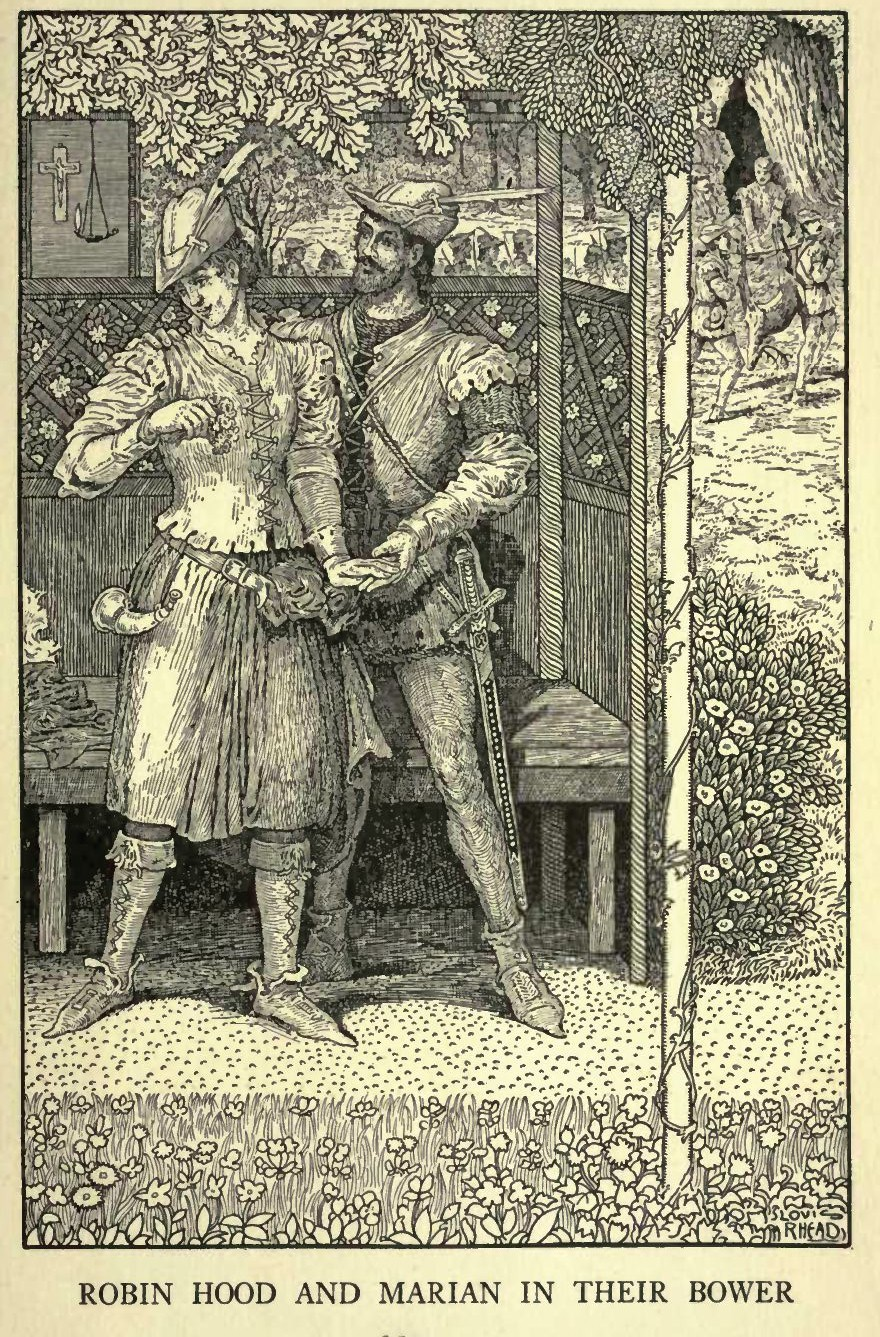
Robin Hood and Marion in their bower

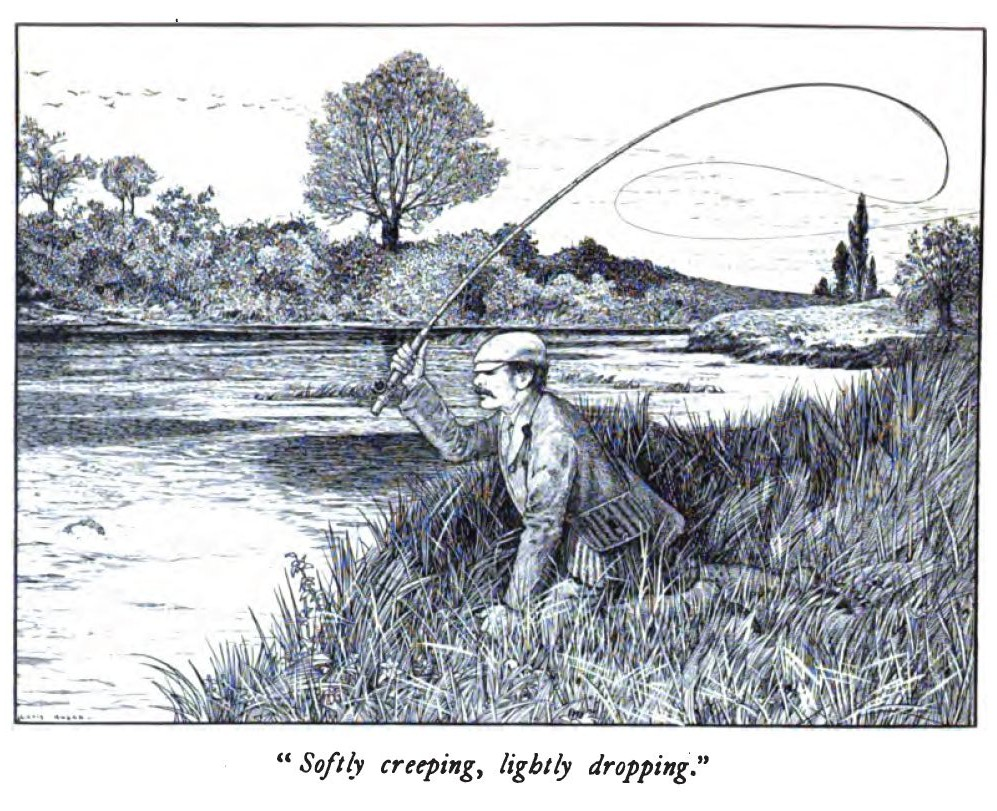
"Softly Creeping and Lightly Dropping" from Speckled Brook Trout

- Tennyson, Alfred (1898). Idylls of the King: Vivien, Elaine, Enid, Guinevere. With sixty original decorations by George Wooliscroft Rhead & Louis Rhead. New York: R. H. Russell.
- Hillis, Nevel Dwight, ed. (1900). The Psalms of David. Illustrated and Decorated by Louis Rhead. Chicago: Fleming H. Revel Company.
- Bunyan, John (1900). The Life and Death of Mr. Badman. Illustrated by George W. and Louis Rhead. London: W. Heinemann.
- Defoe, Daniel (1900). The Life and Strange Adventures of Robinson Crusoe. Illustrated by Frederick and Louis Rhead. New York: R. H. Russell.
- Rhead, Louis, ed. (1902). The Speckled Brook Trout. Introduction by Charles Hallock, Illustrated by Louis Rhead. New York: R. H. Russell.
- Morris, William (translator) (1902). The History of Over Sea. Illustrated by George W. and Louis Rhead. New York: R. H. Russell.
- Harris, William C.; Bean, Tarelton H. (1905). Rhead, Louis (ed.). The Basses-Freshwater and Marine. New York: Frederick A. Stokes Company Publishers.
- Rhead, Louis (1907). A Collection of Bookplate Designs. Boston: W. Porter Truesdell.
- Hughes, Thomas (1911). Tom Brown's School Days (text). Illustrated by Louis Rhead. New York: Harper and Brothers.
- Rhead, Louis (1912). Bold Robin Hood-And His Outlaw Band. New York: Harper & Brothers.
- Bunyan, John; Haweis, H. R. Rev (1912). Pilgrim's Progress-from this world to that which is to come. Embellished with over one hundred and twenty designs done by three brothers: George Woolliscroft Rhead, Frederick Rhead, Louis Rhead. New York: The Century Co.
- Crandall, Lathan A. (1914). Days in the Open. Decorations by Louis Rhead. New York: Fleming H. Revel Company.
- Stevenson, Robert Louis (1915). Treasure Island. Decorated and Illustrated by Louis Rhead. New York: Harper Brothers.
- The Arabian Nights Entertainments. Illustrated and Decorated by Louis Rhead. New York: Harper and Brothers. 1916.
- Rhead, Louis (1916). American Trout Stream Insects-A Guide To Angling Flies and other Aquatic Insects Alluring to Trout. New York: Frederick A. Stokes Company Publishers.
- Rhead, Louis (1920). The Book of Fish and Fishing. New York: Charles Scribner's Sons.
- Rhead, Louis (1920). Fisherman's Lures and Game-Fish Food. New York: Charles Scribner's Sons.
- How To Fish The Dry Fly. Brooklyn, New York: Louis Rhead. 1921.
- Stevenson, Robert Louis (1921). Kidnapped-Being the Memoirs of the Adventures of David Balfour in the year 1751. Illustrated by Louis Rhead. New York: Harper and Brothers.

In the early 20th century, Rhead was a prolific contributor of angling articles in the sporting press--The American Angler, Outing Magazine, Field & Stream, and Forest and Stream

- Rhead, Louis (July 1907). "Vacation Angling for the Family". Outing Magazine. L (4).
- Rhead, Louis (May 1908). "Where to Find Trout and How to Catch Them". Outing Magazine. LII (2).
- Rhead, Louis (June 1908). "Winter Deep-Sea Fishing". Outing Magazine. LII (3).
- Rhead, Louis (November 1909). "Fall Fishing in the Atlantic Surf". Outing Magazine. LV (2).
- Rhead, Louis (August 1909). "Complete Angler in August". Outing Magazine. LIV (5).
- Rhead, Louis (July 1909). "How to Use A Dry Fly". Outing Magazine. LII (4).
- Rhead, Louis (April 1909). "Why Sea Fishing is Popular". Outing Magazine. LIV (1).
- Rhead, Louis (June 1909). "The Angler's Halcyon Days". Outing Magazine. LIV (3).
- Rhead, Louis (December 1909). "Winter Care of Fishing Tackle". Outing Magazine. LV (3).
- Rhead, Louis (September 1909). "September Sport with Rod and Reel". Outing Magazine. LIV (6).
- Rhead, Louis (May 1909). "Return of Weakfish, Tautog, Fluke and other Migratory Fishes". Outing Magazine. LIV (2).
- Rhead, Louis (January 1910). "Winter Deep-Sea Fishing". Outing Magazine. LV (4).
- Rhead, Louis (February 1910). "Tarpon Tackle". Field and Stream. 14 (10).
- Rhead, Louis (March 1910). "The Invincible Mascalonge". Field and Stream. 14 (11).
- Rhead, Louis (June 1910). "Casting for Muskellunge". Outing Magazine. LVI (3).
- Rhead, Louis (1915). "New Lures that are True to Life". Forest and Stream. 85.
- Rhead, Louis (1915). "Some Nature Lures for Summer & Fall Fishing". Forest and Stream. 85.
- Rhead, Louis (1915). "Why Nature Lures are Best for Good Sport". Forest and Stream. 85.
- Rhead, Louis (1915). "Three Best Nature Lures for Bass". Forest and Stream. 85.
- Rhead, Louis (1915). "Supplementary Notes Concerning Nature Lures". Forest and Stream. 85.
- Rhead, Louis (1915). "Trout Flies--Natural and Artificial". Forest and Stream. 85.
- Rhead, Louis (1916). "Silver Shiner & Golden Chub". Forest and Stream. 86.
- Rhead, Louis (1916). "Dry, Wet or Nature Fly-Which shall we offer?". Forest and Stream. 86.
- Rhead, Louis (1916). "Halcyon Angling Days in May". Forest and Stream. 86.
- Rhead, Louis (1916). "Evolution of Bait Angling". Forest and Stream. 86.
- Rhead, Louis (1916). "The Leap of the Game Fish". Forest and Stream. 86.
- Rhead, Louis (1916). "Surface Bait for Game Fish". Forest and Stream. 86.
- Rhead, Louis (1916). "American and British Angling Compared". Forest and Stream. 86.
- Rhead, Louis (1917). "Our Rainbows". Forest and Stream. 87.
- Rhead, Louis (1917). "The Finer Art of Trout Fishing (I)". Forest and Stream. 87.
- Rhead, Louis (1917). "The Finer Art of Trout Fishing (II)". Forest and Stream. 87.
- Rhead, Louis (1917). "How To Tie Leaders and Flies". Forest and Stream. 87.
- Rhead, Louis (1917). "Bait Fishing for Trout". Forest and Stream. 87.
- Rhead, Louis (1917). "Fishing for the Kingly Ouananiche". Forest and Stream. 87.
- Rhead, Louis (1917). "Bass as Gamey Fighters". Forest and Stream. 87.
- Rhead, Louis (1917). "Minnows as Bait for Bass and Trout". Forest and Stream. 87.
- Rhead, Louis (1917). "In the Haunts of Izaak Walton". Forest and Stream. 87.
- Rhead, Louis (1917). "My 'Foul Hooked' Muskie Experience". Forest and Stream. 87.
- Rhead, Louis (1917). "A Bass Bait for Late Season Fishing". Forest and Stream. 87.
- Rhead, Louis (1918). "Trout Insects for Early Fly Fishing". Forest and Stream. 88.
- Rhead, Louis (1918). "Improving the Angler's Equipment". Forest and Stream. 88.
- Rhead, Louis (July 1921). "Hot Weather Fly Fishing". The American Angler. VI (3): 143.
- Rhead, Louis (April 1922). "Downstream Dry-Fly Fishing". Forest and Stream. 92 (4).
- Rhead, Louis (May 1922). "Fishing from Bottom to Surface". Forest and Stream. 92 (5).
- Rhead, Louis (June 1922). "Tying the Fresh Water Shrimp". Forest and Stream. 92 (6).
- Rhead, Louis (July 1922). "Artificial Baits for Trout". Forest and Stream. 92 (7).
- Rhead, Louis (August 1922). "The Carp as a Gamey Food Fish". Forest and Stream. 92 (8).
- Rhead, Louis (September 1922). "The Metal Bodied Fly-Minnow". Forest and Stream. 92 (9).
- Rhead, Louis (November 1922). "The Evolution of the Trout Fly". Forest and Stream. 92 (11).
- Rhead, Louis (December 1922). "How to Skin & Mount a Fish". Forest and Stream. 92 (12).
- Rhead, Louis (1924). "The Troubles of Spring Trout Fishing". Forest and Stream. 94.
- Rhead, Louis (1924). "Fishing in Brooks". Forest and Stream. 94.
- Rhead, Louis (1924). "Fishing the Evening Rise". Forest and Stream. 94.
- Rhead, Louis (1924). "Fly Fishing for the Gamey Little Trout Pickeral". Forest and Stream. 94.
- Rhead, Louis (1924). "Trout Fishing in Lakes". Forest and Stream. 94.
- Rhead, Louis (1924). "Live & Artificial Frogs as Bait". Forest and Stream. 94.
- Rhead, Louis (1924). "A Unique Way to Land the Great Northern Pike". Forest and Stream. 94.
- Rhead, Louis (1925). "The Bird Angler". Forest and Stream. 95.
- Rhead, Louis (1925). "Playing and Netting Big Trout on the Fly". Forest and Stream. 95.
- Rhead, Louis (1925). "The Habits of Trout and Where the Abide". Forest and Stream. 95.
- Rhead, Louis (1925). "Why They Don't Bite". Forest and Stream. 95.
- Rhead, Louis (1925). "Denizens of the Deep". Forest and Stream. 95.
