= Mark Abrams =

British social scientist and market researcher (1906–1994)

- Born: 27 April 1906
- Died: 25 September 1994 (aged 88)
- Education: London School of Economics
- Scientific career
- Fields: Market research, social policy, youth culture, gerontology

Mark Abrams (27 April 1906 – 25 September 1994) was a British social scientist and market research expert who pioneered new techniques in statistical surveying and opinion polling.

== Background and education ==
Mark Abrams was born Max Alexander Abramowitz in Edmonton, North London in 1906 to Jewish parents who had emigrated from Lithuania and Latvia to the East End of London in the 1890s. He later described his father Abram Abramowitz, a journeyman bootmaker, shopkeeper, and house agent, as a 'philosophical anarchist'.

Abrams received a scholarship to attend The Latymer School, then studied economics at the London School of Economics. He went on to complete a PhD in early modern English economic history under the supervision of R. H. Tawney in 1929.

== Career ==
Between 1931 and 1933 Abrams was a research fellow at the progressive Brookings Institution in Washington, DC. In 1933 he joined the research department of the London Press Exchange, one of Britain's leading advertising agencies. Here Abrams began developing his pioneering work in social investigation, market research, and opinion polling by conducting large-scale statistical surveys into consumer behaviour. His national newspaper readership surveys, which included over 20,000 participants between 1934 and 1938, were landmarks in survey research and were credited with establishing the widespread use of the ABC1 system of social classification in Britain. Abrams's contacts with other social scientists working abroad during this period led to his work retrieving refugees from Nazi Europe (in 1939 helping Sigmund Freud make his final move to England).

During World War II Abrams was employed first in the BBC Overseas Research Department, then at the Psychological Warfare Board, where he carried out government surveys into working-class diets under rationing and the impact of bombing on civilian morale, and also commissioned covert psychological analysis into the mind of Adolf Hitler. His studies of food consumption during the war contributed to the establishment of the National Food Survey in 1940.

Abrams returned to the London Press Exchange in 1946 to direct its research department as an independent subsidiary consultancy, Research Services Ltd. By the early 1960s the company employed over ninety members of staff and produced surveys for 300 clients a year, including academic as well as commercial, political, and public sector organisations. Research Services Ltd. was commissioned by Monica Felton to undertake social surveys prior to the building of Peterlee new town and the establishment of The Sun newspaper. Abrams, along with contemporary pollsters such as Henry Durant of the British Institute of Public Opinion, gained a reputation as an expert authority on market research and mass communication techniques in Britain, and published widely in academic journals as well as newspapers and the popular press. Two of his most influential market research reports coined the phrase 'teenage consumer', drawing attention to the new significance of a rapidly expanding youth market for products and advertising. Abrams was one of the founding members of the Market Research Society and an advisor of the Consumers' Association. Research Services Ltd. (later known as RSL) was one of the founder companies of Ipsos MORI.

From the mid-1950s Abrams became closely connected with the Labour Party and carried out many of their private opinion polls, first with the modernisers in the party aligned with Hugh Gaitskell and then Harold Wilson, for whom he worked on the development of Labour's publicity campaign for the 1964 general election.

Abrams left his chairmanship of Research Services Limited in 1970 to become Director of the Survey Research Unit at the Social Science Research Council, under Michael Young. Between 1971 and 1975 he worked on the 'Quality of Life in Britain' surveys, which included the innovative use of 'subjective social indicators' to track perceptions of social change. Between 1976–1985, Abrams was Research Director at the Age Concern Institute of Gerontology, King's College London, where he undertook studies of living standards among people aged 65 and over. He was also Vice-President of the Policy Studies Institute between 1978 and 1994.

== Publications ==
- Money and a Changing Civilisation (London: John Lane, 1934)
- The Population of Great Britain (London: Allen & Unwin, 1945)
- The Condition of the British People, 1911–1945 (London: Gollancz, 1946)
- Social Surveys and Social Action (London: Heinemann, 1951)
- The Teenage Consumer (London: London Press Exchange, 1959)
- Must Labour Lose? (Harmondsworth: Penguin, 1960), with Richard Rose and Rita Hinden
- The Newspaper Reading Public of Tomorrow (London: Odhams, 1964)
- Beyond Three Score and Ten (Mitcham: Age Concern, 1980)
- People in Their Sixties (Mitcham: Age Concern, 1983)
- Values and Social Change in Britain (Basingstoke: Palgrave Macmillan, 1985), with David Gerard and Noel Timms (eds.)
