= Monica Felton =

British writer, town planner, feminist and social activist

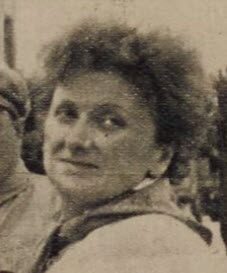
- Born: Monica Glory Page; September 23, 1906
- Died: March 4, 1970; Madras, India
- Occupations: Town planner, peace activist

Monica Felton (23 September 1906 – 4 March 1970) was a British writer, town planner, feminist and social activist, a member of the Labour Party.

== Early life ==
Monica Glory Page (later Felton) was born on 23 September 1906, the eldest of four siblings, Una Hilary (b. 1908) who became a teacher and worked in Africa in the 1930s, Basil (b. 1910) and Gwythian Lloyd (1914-2006) who became a consulting engineer. She was brought up in a staunch Primitive Methodists household. Her mother Una Page (née Bone) (1879-1926) wrote temperance hymns, and her father Rev. Thomas Lloyd Page was a Primitive Methodist minister.

She attended Wycombe High School then studied at the University of Southampton and was later awarded a PhD at the London School of Economics; she was later appointed to its board of governors. Her PhD tite was ‘A study of emigration from Great Britain 1802–1860’. She became a lecturer for the Workers’ Educational Association where she taught Ernest Millington, later an MP.

In 1931 she married Berwyn Idris Felton. They were separated by 1939, and later divorced as Berwyn subsequently remarried in 1951.

Felton had been living in Majorca when the Spanish Civil War started and, on her return to the UK, gave talks about what she saw in Spain at that time.

In 1937 Felton was elected to the London County Council as a Labour Party councillor representing St Pancras South West, holding the seat until 1946. She demonstrated a detailed understanding of the role of women in wartime society and munitions production, in her novel 'To All the Living'.

She was employed as a Temporary Clerk in the House of Commons from May 1942 to December 1943, working as an economic adviser to the National Expenditure Committee.

From 1949 to 1951, she served as the first Chairman of the Corporation for the construction of the new town of Stevenage.

== Town planner ==
During the late 1930s, Felton became a leading urban planner. She was elected to the London County Council in 1937 and continued as an elected representative until the start of the Second World War. However, she also took an interest in rural planning, foreseeing the coming war and food problems:

“Do we want to make farming profitable if it means destroying the countryside, or if it means running risks of losing people off the land, or if it means running risks of not having sufficient supplies of food in war time?”

During the war she worked for the British Ministry of Supply and was recommended by Lewis Silkin, 1st Baron Silkin for a role on the Select Committee on National Expenditure for the house of Commons. Although this was later described to be in a secretarial capacity, in fact she was an economic advisor to the committee. During the war and afterwards, Felton lectured on urban planning and housing for the BBC Home Service and BBC World Service.

== New Towns ==
After the war hundreds of thousands of new homes were being built. Felton was closely involved in the planning and implementation involved. In the years 1945–1946 she was part of the major New Towns Committee, led by John Reith. Of 15 members of the committee, Felton was the only woman. She worked for the London County Council and Hertfordshire County Council. Her connections with Silkin then led to her appointment as Vice-Chairman of the Stevenage Development Corporation in 1947.

In 1948, shortly after her election to the Stevenage Development Corporation, Felton became the chairman of the Peterlee Development corporation, working closely with Berthold Lubetkin. Whilst in Peterlee, Felton pioneered social research led by women. She commissioned Mark Abrahms to carry out a 'social and economic' survey for the New Town. Working with ‘trained housewives’, he produced New Town for Old: The Peterlee Social Survey before the end of 1948.

Her Peterlee chairmanship ended in 1949 and she returned to Stevenage as the chairman of the Stevenage Development Corporation in the county of Hertfordshire. Stevenage was the first of the post-war new towns that were built by the Labour government on the basis of the New Towns Act of 1946. she held the post for just two years (see below).

== North Korea ==
In 1951, Felton visited North Korea as part of the Women's International Democratic Federation commission and outlined her impressions in the book That's Why I Went (1954), adhering to an anti-war position. During her visit, she was urged to take the full-scale North Korean view of the origins of the conflict, and briefly met the leader, Kim Il Sung. After her visit to Korea she was fired from her job as Chairman of the Stevenage Development Corporation, expelled from the Labour Party and threatened with prosecution for treason. Her visit to North Korea included viewing the aftermath of Korean War atrocities, which she was told by locals were committed by the United States, British and Syngman Rhee forces. A recorded talk she made about this was broadcast from Moscow and her visit and the talk were discussed in the House of Commons.

In 1953, Felton published a seven page pamphlet entitled 'Korea! How to Bring the Boys Home' and became a member of the World Peace Council. She was awarded the International Stalin Prize "for peace between peoples" (1951).

== Women's Organising ==
In 1952, Felton chaired the inaugural meeting of the National Assembly of Women at St. Pancras Town Hall in London. Issues vocalised in this meeting included condemnation of the Korean War and support for disarmament.

== India ==
In 1956, Felton moved to India. Whilst attending a forum in India, Felton met with Rajaji, an Indian lawyer, independence activist, politician, writer and statesman, and also the last Governor-General of India. She later wrote his biography, I Meet Rajaji (1962). Felton died in Madras on 4 March 1970.

== Publications ==
- To All the Living, (1945)
- British War Production and the Consumer (Ministry of Information), (1945)
- That’s Why I Went, (1953)
- I Meet Rajaji, (1962)
- A Child Widow’s Story, (1966)
