= Howard Thomas (producer) =

UK radio producer and TV executive (1909–1986)

- Born: 5 March 1909; Monmouthshire
- Died: 6 November 1986 (aged 77); Henley-on-Thames, England
- Employer(s): BBC Radio; ABC-TV; Thames Television
- Known for: Producer; television executive
- Spouse: Hilda (m. 1934–1986)
- Children: 2

Howard Thomas CBE (5 March 1909 – 6 November 1986) was a Welsh radio producer and television executive.

== Early career ==
Thomas began his career typing invoices for a firm of wire-drawers in Manchester. While doing that job, he taught himself to write newspaper articles and short plays. When some of these articles were published, he managed to get a job in the firm's advertising department. That job enabled Thomas to mix with advertising agents and through networking he obtained a position with F John Roe, one of Manchester's advertising agencies.

He moved to the London agency F C Prichard Wood and Partners, and he continued to write articles, having a London entertainment column in the Manchester Evening Chronicle. This column was spotted by the London Press Exchange and he was hired by them as a copywriter.

== Commercial radio ==
At London Press Exchange, Thomas worked in the commercial radio section, at first writing, then producing commercial packages for companies including Cadbury's. These packages, usually of music or variety acts interspersed with subtle commercials for the sponsor, were then placed on Radio Luxembourg and similar longwave broadcasters who could be heard in the UK.

In this position, he came to the attention of the BBC, and he began to submit scripts and programme ideas to them while continuing to work for the international commercial broadcasters. However, at the outbreak of World War II, the commercial broadcasters closed and the advertising market contracted. Thomas kept his post at London Press Exchange, but effectively had no work to do. He attempted to fill time by writing books about the blackout and writing more articles for newspapers, and also worked for Publicity Films Limited producing public information films.

== BBC radio ==
On the outbreak of war, the BBC had closed its existing two Regional Programme and National Programme stations and replaced them with a single national station, the Home Service (now BBC Radio 4).

This move was criticised as it led to boredom amongst the listeners during the Phony War, who were also faced with cinemas and sporting events being closed "for the duration" and the loss of the competition to the BBC.

As the Phony War ended, the BBC decided to introduce an entertainment-based national radio station, primarily for the men under arms. The new service, the Forces Programme hired many new producers from the former commercial agencies, including Howard Thomas.

=== Ack Ack Beer Beer ===
Thomas's first assignment was to produce the programme Ack Ack Beer Beer, an entertainment and variety programme for anti-aircraft and barrage balloon emplacements. Both jobs featured very little action and therefore the BBC felt that 'lively' entertainment had to be provided for the crews.

Under Thomas, the programme developed into a miscellany of variety, talk, music and comedy, using whatever talent was available near the evacuated Variety Department's studios in Bristol. On occasion this was no talent at all, and Thomas later told of an edition made up of him and his co-producer playing "Shove ha'penny", which had the side effect of reintroducing the game to the population.

=== Sincerely Yours, Vera Lynn ===
With Bristol now a victim of the Blitz, the Variety Department moved to Bangor in north Wales. However, feeling that opportunities for variety would be limited there, Thomas engineered a move back to London.

In London he spotted singer Vera Lynn in a stage show. He created a radio programme for her called Sincerely Yours, Vera Lynn where she sang popular tunes of the time, read out letters from servicemen and introduced entertainers.

The show was a hit, both with the forces and the country at large, although the senior officers of both the British Army and the Royal Navy strongly objected to the sentimental and "soppy" music and presentation. Nevertheless, the show helped turn the song "We'll Meet Again" into one of the best selling pieces of music throughout the war. The show also cemented Vera Lynn's title of "forces' sweetheart" and ensured that she would remain, as of 2006, something akin to a national treasure in the UK.

To assuage critics of Sincerely Yours, Thomas introduced the programme I Am John Bull, featuring military marches and "strong" music. The programme was not successful.

=== Shipmates Ashore ===
The BBC Forces Programme provided distinct programming for each of the armed services. However, the Merchant Navy, not being classed as an armed service and under the patronage of the Ministry of Labour, was not included.

Howard Thomas began a programme named Shipmates Ashore aimed at this audience. The programme was set in a Merchant Navy club and quickly became an effectively real club, with free beer and "companionship" for visiting merchant seamen. The show featured a mixture of music, singing, comedy and information (in the form of a "ship's newspaper") as well as providing a platform for discussion of issues of interest to the sailors. The programme was presented by Doris Hare.

=== The Brains Trust ===
As conceived by Howard Thomas and Douglas Cleverdon, The Brains Trust was a simple mixture of light panel game entertainment and heavier discussion of items of scientific, legal, medical and social importance. At that time, there was much discussion in the UK about the shape of the world and the country after the war, which reached its peak with the Beveridge Report and the 1945 landslide election of Attlee's Labour government.

The programme featured Professor Cyril E. M. Joad, previously rejected for radio for his strange speaking voice; the writer and zoologist Julian Huxley; and the loud and entertaining Archibald Bruce Campbell. The programme first aired under the title Any Questions? and drew a small audience and few questions. However, within a few weeks it had caught the zeitgeist of the nation, gaining an audience of 11½million. The series was extended from a run of 12 episodes into an open-ended series that ran into the 1950s.

However, the popularity of the programme, dealing as it did with matters of controversy and politics, caused complaints of left-wing bias from within the BBC and from commentators outside. The BBC attempted to modify the format of the programme to avoid this but also sought to avoid damaging the shows popularity. With military criticism of Sincerely Yours, general complaints about the bawdy humour in Shipmates Ashore and political criticism of The Brains Trust, the BBC sought a scapegoat and pressured Howard Thomas to leave. In 1944, he resigned.

== British Pathé ==
On leaving the BBC, Howard Thomas joined the Associated British Picture Corporation as head of British Pathé, the newsreel and film company.

Thomas relaunched the ailing Pathé Gazette as Pathé News, began hiring new cameramen and pioneered the switch to colour film. He also arranged for the Pathé archives, then of little or no intrinsic value to the company, to be indexed and properly preserved for future use.

== ABC-TV ==
By the 1950s, it was becoming clear that television was eroding the size of cinema audiences. Frustrated at his inability to convince the Associated British Picture Corporation that it should either expand into production of popular feature films or bid for one of the new commercial broadcasting licences offered under the Television Act 1954 by the Independent Television Authority (ITA), Howard Thomas began to look for roles in the new ITV companies that were being started.

He was offered the job of General Manager of Kemsley-Winnick Television, the new weekend contractor for the Midlands and north of England. However, before he could take up the job, Lord Kemsley pulled out of the company and the contract lapsed.

The ITA made a last-ditch attempt to get the Associated British Picture Corporation involved in commercial television as a replacement for Kemsley-Winnick. The board of the company was finally convinced to try, and signed a contract with the ITA on 21 September 1955 to form Associated British Cinemas (Television) Limited (ABC) to take over the contract.

Howard Thomas was appointed as managing director of the company and hired Sydney Newman and Brian Tesler as his controllers of drama and light entertainment respectively.

== Thames Television ==
In 1966, the ITA announced that the pattern of broadcasting for Independent Television was to change from 1968. All contractors would be required to reapply for their contracts, and, though there would be one more contract available than before (for Yorkshire), the previous weekend splits in the three central regions of London, the midlands and the north of England would be altered. The London split would change to Friday evenings (rather than the self-contained weekend it had previously been) and the midlands and the north would be redivided into three whole-week regions. ABC's contract area would therefore cease to exist.

Howard Thomas had planned for ABC Television to apply for the extended London weekends contract (with an application for the Midlands seven-day contract as a stand-by). However, the appearance of a consortium of major figures from the BBC and Rediffusion under the leadership of David Frost made this difficult. The London Television Consortium (later London Weekend Television) won the contract, and the ITA was left with no place for ABC.

The ITA's solution was to ask ABC and Rediffusion to merge to form a new company. They specified that ABC would have a slim majority of the shares, and that the managing director would be Howard Thomas. In practice, the merger proved impossible due to outside interests held by both parent companies. Instead, the parent companies formed a joint company called Thames Television Holdings Limited (trading as Thames Television), the shares of which were 51% owned by ABC and 49% owned by Rediffusion, with profits being shared equally. This company took over the staff of ABC in Teddington and a minority of staff from Rediffusion. Management and on-screen talent was mainly provided by former ABC staff.

Thames retained the London weekdays licence until 31 December 1992.

== Retirement ==
The Independent Broadcasting Authority set a limit on the age of managing directors of ITV companies, specifying that they retire at the age of 75.

When Howard Thomas reached this age, Thames Television Holdings (the company that held the shares in Thames formerly held by the now-defunct Associated British Picture Corporation) promoted him from Thames Television to become chairman of Thames Television International – then a subsidiary of Thames but previously known as EMI Films and, before that, the remains of the former ABC owner Associated British Picture Corporation.

== Family ==
Howard Thomas married Hilda in 1934 and they had two daughters, Rosemary and Carol.

He was appointed a Commander of the Order of the British Empire (CBE) in 1967.

== See also ==
- The Avengers
- Armchair Theatre
- Eamonn Andrews
