= London Press Exchange =

- Industry: Advertising agency
- Founded: 1892; 133 years ago
- Founder: Frederick Higginbottom; Reginald J. Sykes
- Defunct: 1969
- Fate: Merged with Leo Burnett Worldwide
- Headquarters: London, United Kingdom

The London Press Exchange was founded in 1892 by Frederick Higginbottom and Reginald J.Sykes, becoming a significant Government advertising agency during World War II. It merged with the Leo Burnett agency in 1969.

The agency also produced promotional work for the 1921 film Elsie and the Brown Bunny, and advertising posters for the 1951 Festival of Britain.

On 5 November 1946, the Market Research Society was created in the London Press Exchange offices.

== Notable people ==
- Frederick Higginbottom (1859 - 1943) co-founder
- Keith Lucas (d.2012) who became director of the British Film Institute
- William Stewart (b. 1886 Greenwich), Director
- Howard Thomas (1909—1986) worked in the commercial radio section
- Mark Abrams (1906-1994) led its research function in the 1930s doing ground breaking studies Mark Abrams
- Phillip Boydell (1896-1984) Art Director and designer of the Festival of Britain font.

== Bibliography ==
- London Press Exchange at the National Archives
- "Visit of The Institute to the London Press Exchange Limited", Journal of the Royal Statistical Society, Series D (The Statistician), Vol. 13, No. 1 (1963), pp. 47–53, Published by Wiley-Blackwell
- Material at the Museum of London
- "A Letter from the London Press Exchange", bbc.co.uk, retrieved 17 August 2012
- London Press Exchange at Google News archives
