= The Pall Mall Gazette =

British newspaper

- Front page of the first edition
- Type: Daily (afternoons)
- Owner(s): G. Smith (1865–80); H. Thompson (1880–92); W. Astor (1892–1915); H. Dalziel (1916–23)
- Founded: 7 February 1865
- Ceased publication: 1923
- Language: English
- Headquarters: London

The Pall Mall Gazette was an evening newspaper founded in London on 7 February 1865 by George Murray Smith; its first editor was Frederick Greenwood. In 1921, The Globe merged into The Pall Mall Gazette, which itself was absorbed into The Evening Standard in 1923.

Beginning late in 1868 and continuing at least through the 1880s, a selection or digest of its contents was published as the weekly Pall Mall Budget.

== History ==
The Pall Mall Gazette took the name of a fictional newspaper conceived by W. M. Thackeray. Pall Mall is a street in London where many gentlemen's clubs are located, hence Thackeray's description of this imaginary newspaper in his novel The History of Pendennis (1848–1850):

We address ourselves to the higher circles of society: we care not to disown it—The Pall Mall Gazette is written by gentlemen for gentlemen; its conductors speak to the classes in which they live and were born. The field-preacher has his journal, the radical free-thinker has his journal: why should the Gentlemen of England be unrepresented in the Press?

Under the ownership of George Smith of Smith, Elder & Co. from 1865 to 1880, with Frederick Greenwood as editor, The Pall Mall Gazette was a Conservative newspaper. Greenwood resigned in 1880, when the paper's new owner (Smith's new son-in-law, Henry Thompson) wished for it to support the policies of the Liberal Party. Taking all the staff with him, Greenwood became the editor of the newly-founded St James's Gazette and maintained his advocacy of Conservative policy. The first editor under Thompson's ownership was John Morley (later Viscount Morley), with W. T. Stead as assistant editor. Morley resigned in 1883 to go into politics.

Stead's editorship from 1883 to 1889 saw the paper cover such subjects as child prostitution; his campaign compelled the government to increase the age of consent from 13 to 16 in 1885. This was one of the first examples of investigative journalism, and Stead was arrested for "unlawful taking of a child" (when he purchased thirteen-year-old Eliza Armstrong from her mother for the meagre price of £5, to highlight how easy it was to buy children). The affair distressed Thompson, who dismissed Stead and hired the handsome society figure Henry Cust to replace him. Editor from 1892 to 1896, Cust returned the paper to its Conservative beginnings.

Thompson sold the paper to William Waldorf Astor in 1896. Sir Douglas Straight was editor until 1909, followed by F. J. Higginbottom, under whom the paper declined. Circulation doubled between 1911–15 under the editor James Louis Garvin, but the paper declined once more under its last editor D. L. Sutherland. It was absorbed into the Evening Standard in 1923.

Under Stead, the Gazette also changed how it reported. It made a feature of interviews, signed special articles, maps and illustrations, and Pall Mall extras, features later associated with "New Journalism".

Several well-known writers contributed to The Pall Mall Gazette over the years. George Bernard Shaw gained his first job in journalism writing for the paper. Other contributors included Anthony Trollope, Friedrich Engels, Oscar Wilde, Robert Louis Stevenson, Charles Whibley, Sir Spencer Walpole, Arthur Patchett Martin, and Jamaican-born writer Eneas Sweetland Dallas.

The British Weekly, "one of the most successful religious newspapers of its time", followed stylistically in the footsteps of the Pall Mall Gazette, "including interviews of prominent personalities, use of line illustrations and photographs, special supplements, investigative reporting, sensationalist headlines, and serialised debates".

== References in popular culture ==
Many works of fiction refer to The Pall Mall Gazette. For example:

- Consulting detective Sherlock Holmes places an advertisement in newspapers including The Pall Mall Gazette, in "The Adventure of the Blue Carbuncle" (1892).
- In Bram Stoker's epistolary novel Dracula (1897), the reader is presented with a Pall Mall Gazette article describing the escape of a wolf from the Zoological Gardens.
- In H. G. Wells's The Time Machine (1895), the Time Traveller returns to London and sees that day's edition of The Pall Mall Gazette. From its date he knows that he is home at his starting point in time.
- In Wells's The War of the Worlds (1898), the narrator describes the "pre-Martian periodical called Punch" as a prophecy.
- In director Nicholas Meyer's first feature film Time After Time (1979), H. G. Wells travels through time to 1979 San Francisco. He remarks to a 1979 acquaintance "I used to write for a newspaper, the Pall Mall Gazette".
- In the Peruvian novel Vienen los Chilenos (The Chileans are Coming) by Guillermo Thorndike (1978), Mr. Petrie, an English gentleman travelling to Lima during the 19th-century Saltpeter War, visits its Phoenix Club, where Englishmen and England-educated Peruvians meet and converse in English. In its library he selects The Times, The Pall Mall Gazette, and some American newspapers.
- In Gabriele D'Annunzio's novel The Pleasure, the Pall Mall Gazette is referenced as the scandalous English newspaper.

== Ownership ==
- George Smith (1865–1880)
- Henry Yates Thompson (1880–1892)
- William Waldorf Astor (1892–1917)
- Henry Dalziel (1917–1923)

== Editorship ==
Editor's name	Years
Frederick Greenwood	1865–1880
John Morley	1880–1883
William Thomas Stead	1883–1889
Edward Tyas Cook	1890–1892
Henry Cust	1892–1896
Douglas Straight	1896–1909
Frederick Higginbottom	1909–1912
James Louis Garvin	1912–1915
D. M. Sutherland	1915–1923

== See also ==
- List of newspapers in the United Kingdom
- Pall Mall Budget
