= Beryl Price =

British composer

Beryl Price (born 7 March 1912) was a British composer who created original works in many genres and arranged folk tunes as teaching pieces for young music students. Several of her original compositions were for historic instruments such as clavichord, virginal and viol.

Price was born in London. She attended the Royal Academy of Music, and studied with Harry Farjeon, Ernest Read, and Charles Reddic.

Little is known about Price’s life. In 1949, she composed the music for two films by the Royal Society for the Prevention of Accidents entitled Human Factor and Trouble in Toytown. In 1959, her String Trio won the W. W. Cobbett Memorial Prize adjudicated by Gordon Jacob, Norman Peterkin, and Ivor Walsworth. In 2003, her song “I Love to Tell the Story” was recorded commercially on CWMNI Recordio Talent TAL 012CD.

Price’s works were published by Curwen Press, Oxford University Press, and Stainer & Bell. Her compositions include:

== Chamber ==
- Airs from Seven Lands (flute and piano)
- Catriona’s Scottish Airs (clarinet and piano)
- Emerald Isle (cello)
- Five Bagatelles (woodwind quartet)
- Moreton Bagatelles (treble and bass viols, harpsichord)
- Moto Perpetuo (violin)
- Sonata (viola and piano)
- String Trio

== Keyboard ==
- Five Pieces (clavichord)
- Music for Virginals
- On the Go (piano)
- Sonata (piano)
- Variations on the Literary Dustman: 11 Etudes (piano)

== Incidental Music ==
- Human Factor
- The Sea, Music for Mime (two pianos)
- Trouble in Toy Town

== Orchestra ==
- Concerto for Cello and Orchestra

== Vocal ==
- Ass’s Tale Christmas Cantata (women’s chorus and piano)
- “Come, You Makers of Music”
- (A) Cycle of Cats (text by T. S. Eliot, Ruth Pitter and Christopher Smart)
- “Duke of Wellington”
- “First Came the Primrose”
- Four Things Exceeding Wise (women’s a capella chorus)
- Hear Joel (mixed chorus and organ)
- “I Love to Tell the Story”
- “Lubber Breeze”
- On Song’s Eternity (chorus and virginals)
- “Piper’s Carol”
- Puer Natus Est (mixed chorus and organ)
- Shepherds and Angels Christmas Suite (women’s chorus and piano)
- “Shepherd on a Hill”
- Sigh No More, Ladies (women’s a capella chorus)
- “Snail”
- Songs from Cavalcanti (text by Guido Cavalcanti)
- Songs of Heroes
- “Sweet Afton”
- Two Songs of the Nativity (chorus and piano)
- “We Saw Him Sleeping”
- Wise Men’s Riddles (a capella double chorus)
