= Edward Coxere =

British seaman

Edward Coxere (1633–1694) was a Kentish merchant seaman, linguist, Quaker convert and autobiographer.

== Autobiography ==
His manuscript autobiography surfaced in 1943 and was edited by E. H. W. Meyerstein and published by Oxford University Press in 1945 as Adventures by Sea. The small-format book has a map of Europe and North Africa as its end-papers. The text has 19 pages of prelims and 110 pages of text and 22 pages of notes, together with a sourced genealogical table. There are seven illustrations derived from the original manuscript.

== Picaresque style of writing ==
The Oxford Dictionary of National Biography article characterises Coxere's autobiography thus: "His picaresque narrative, written in or after 1685, is one of the most vivid accounts of seafaring life, revealing an intelligent, brave and quick-witted man, hardened by danger and adversity but retaining both humour and humanity.".

== Imprisonment in Dover Castle ==
After his conversion to the Quaker faith, he suffered several terms of imprisonment, including a long period in Dover Castle.

== Pronanciation of his name ==
It is likely that his surname was pronounced "Coxery".
