= Frederick Higginbottom =

- Born: Frederick James Higginbottom; 21 October 1859; Accrington, Lancashire, England
- Died: 12 May 1943 (aged 83); Briston, Norfolk, England
- Occupations: Journalist and editor
- Spouse: Ann Elizabeth Neville (m. 1884-1922)

(21 October 1859 – 12 May 1943) was a British journalist and newspaper editor.

The son of a mathematics tutor, Higginbottom was born in Accrington, Lancashire. He began his career as a journalist with the Southport Daily News at the age of fifteen, and became the editor of the Southport Visiter just five years later. Though a small paper, it provided him with an opportunity to demonstrate his skills, and he was hired by the Press Association in 1881 to serve as their Dublin correspondent in 1882.

Higginbottom moved to London in 1892, where he served briefly as a correspondent for an Irish newspaper before founding the London Press Exchange, which provided news and advertising for the provincial press. He also started working for the Pall Mall Gazette as their parliamentary correspondent. In 1900, he left for a position with the Daily Chronicle, but returned to the Pall Mall Gazette soon afterward.

In 1909, Higginbottom was named editor of the Pall Mall Gazette by its owner, William Waldorf Astor. As editor, Higginbottom proved capable but unimaginative. He did little to change the paper's position on the issues of the day, nor did he succeed in restoring the Gazette to profitability. After three years as editor, Astor replaced him with J. L. Garvin and Higginbottom returned to his position as parliamentary correspondent. He continued with the Pall Mall Gazette (apart from a brief period as director of press intelligence for the Ministry of National Service in 1917–18) until 1919, when he moved to the Daily Chronicle. He worked for the Chronicle until his retirement in 1930.

== Works ==
- The Vivid Life: A Journalist's Career (London: Simpkin Marshall Limited, 1934)

Media offices
Preceded by Douglas Straight	Editor of The Pall Mall Gazette; 1909–1912	Succeeded by James Louis Garvin
