= Ernest Read =

English conductor (1879–1965)

Ernest Read CBE (22 February 1879 – 9 October 1965) was an English conductor, organist, and music educator. He had a profound impact on the development of music education within England during the first half of the 20th century, and published several books on music pedagogy. He was named a Commander of the Order of the British Empire in 1956.

Read was born in Guildford. From 1896 to 1906 he studied at the Royal Academy of Music under Tobias Matthay and Henry Joseph Wood. He served as the principal of the Watford School of Music from 1913 to 1920. He also taught conducting and ear training on the faculty of the RAM from 1919 to 1950. His students included Edwin Bélanger, William Ifor Jones, and Beryl Price. In 1926 he founded the London Junior Orchestra, one of the earliest youth symphonies in England. That orchestra spawned 4 more youth orchestras in the city of London and 11 affiliate youth orchestras throughout Great Britain.

In 1931 Read founded the Ernest Read Symphony Orchestra (ERSO), a professional orchestra with a commitment to performing concerts accessible to children as well as adults. He conducted the orchestra up until his death 34 years later, taking it to concerts in schools, concert halls and for the BBC.

For some years (running until the late 1990s) the related organisation ERMA (Ernest Read Music Association) ran summer schools for talented musical students and keen adult amateur musicians. These primarily featured orchestras playing the large-scale symphonic orchestral repertoire, but also with associated choral, conducting, percussion and listeners' courses. These took place initially at Queenswood School, Herts, then ran for a while at Roedean School, and latterly at St Mary's School, Wantage.

Read was a keen exponent of Dalcroze eurhythmics, a holistic approach to music through bodily movement, developed by Swiss musician Émile Jaques-Dalcroze. In 1945 he established the lauded Ernest Read Concerts for Children, which ran until the late 1990s. ERSO remain active today (2024). Read died, aged 86, in London.
