= Gavin Bantock =

English poet (born 1939)

British poet Gavin Bantock

Gavin Bantock (born 4 July 1939) is an English poet; he is the grandson of Granville Bantock. He was born in Barnt Green, and attended New College, Oxford, where he won the Richard Hillary prize for poetry. He traveled to Japan in 1964 on the advice of his father, Raymond, and returned five years later to teach at Reitaku University. He has remained in the country ever since. Initially teaching English language and literature at Reitaku, he began also leading a group of students in productions of English plays, which eventually became his primary career. After retiring from Reitaku in 1994, he became the drama coach at Meitoku Gijuku High School in Kochi.

Many of Bantock's poems treat elements of Christianity, history, mythology, or medieval and Renaissance literature in arresting, often disturbing terms. His book-length poem "Christ," first published in 1965 and issued in a revised edition in 2020, is skeptical of "any idea of an innate and preordained divinity in an incarnate Christ," according to Adrian A. Husain's introduction to the revised edition. His poems "Joy" and "Dirge" were included by Philip Larkin in The Oxford Book of Twentieth Century English Verse. John Matthias included excerpts from Bantock's "Hiroshima," which Matthias calls "terrifying," in the collection 23 Modern British Poets.

== Selected books ==
- Christ: A Poem in Twenty-Six Parts. Oxford: D. Parsons, 1965. OCLC 8818320
- Juggernaut. Northwood: Anvil Press Poetry, 1968. OCLC 42302
- A New Thing Breathing. Northwood: Anvil Press Poetry, 1969. ISBN 0900977086
- Anhaga. London: Anvil Press Poetry, 1972. ISBN 0900977345
- Eirenikon: A Poem. London: Anvil Press Poetry, 1972. ISBN 0900977876
- Isles. Feltham: Quarto Press, 1974. ISBN 9780901105103
- Dragons. London: Anvil Press Poetry, 1979. ISBN 9780856460494
- Just Think of It. London: Anvil Press Poetry, 2002. ISBN 9780856463167
- SeaManShip. Manchester: Carcanet, 2003. ISBN 9780856463587
- Christos, Lovesong of the Son of Man: A Poem in Twenty-Six Parts. (Revision of 1965 work) First Servant Books, 2020.ISBN 9798685521552
- Hail, Salubrious Spot! (How's Your Rupture): Memories of a Worcestershire Village. First Servant Books, 2020. ISBN 9798687038935
- Thys Felyship: Oxford Days Around 1960, A Memoir. First Servant Books, 2021 ISBN 9798749099270
- Shakespeare for Student Actors [First Servant Shakespeare Edition in 35 vols.] First Servant Books, 2022. ISBN 9798419646957
- Playhouse, A Theatrical Cavalcade, Sixty New Poems First Servant Books, 2022 ISBN 9798839933682
