= E. H. W. Meyerstein =

British writer

Edward Harry William Meyerstein (11 August 1889 – 12 September 1952) was an English writer and scholar. He wrote poetry, multiple novels, and over 100 short stories of which only a handful reached publication.

== Early life and education ==
Meyerstein was born in Hampstead, London, the only son of Edward William Meyerstein and his wife Jessy Louise Solomon. His father was a merchant and stockbroker who was generous benefactor to the Royal Free Hospital became High Sheriff of Kent and was knighted in 1938. Meyerstein was educated at Holly Hill, Hampstead, and then went to board at St Cyprian's School, Eastbourne. At St Cyprian's, he met the future painter Cedric Morris, started collecting manuscripts from local bookshops and won the Harrow History Prize. With this under his belt, his mother then sent him to Harrow. Brought up as a Protestant, he was baptised before going to Harrow, with George Adolphus Storey the painter as his godfather. After Harrow, he went to Magdalen College, Oxford, where he had many friends including Wilfred Rowland Childe and John Wain. His verse was published in Oxford Poetry 1910–13 and later volumes.

== Career ==
After Oxford, Meyerstein spent some time in Germany before starting work in the manuscript room of the British Museum. In the autumn of 1914 he enlisted in the Royal Dublin Fusiliers, but was discharged as "not likely to become an efficient soldier".

He returned to the British Museum where he stayed until Armistice Day 1918. He was becoming increasingly discontented with regular work, but a visit from his mother became the final straw and he resigned. Here he based his short novel "Bollond", which although written in 1920 remained unpublished until 1958, after his death. It is the story of a young man's misadventures adrift in the West End of London in the last months of the War. Reginald Bollond, the central character, unwittingly attracts the attention of a series of homosexuals, including a cocaine dealer who wants to set him up as a rent boy. Meyerstein decided to develop his writing and his collections and his interests in the arts. He became a Fellow of Magdalen College and considered himself a man of letters thereafter. Apart from occasional holidays in the English countryside and in Europe, he spent most of his life in his rooms at Greys Inn Place. He wrote "A Life of Thomas Chatterton" – the promising poet who committed suicide at an early age – in 1930 and produced various works of poetry which were published in collections. Occasional music criticism also appeared under his name in the journal Music Survey.

== Legacies ==
He made important bequests to his college and the British Library (including part of a Mozart manuscript). He also made significant bequests to the English Language and Literature Faculty and the Life and Environmental Sciences Faculty at Oxford University. These bequests provide funds to this day. His will also established the Chatterton Lectures on Poetry: an annual lecture to be given by a lecturer, under the age of 40, on the life and works of a deceased English poet (interpreted as 'a deceased poet who wrote in the English language'). An inaugural lecture on Meyerstein himself was delivered in 1955 by the historian Lionel Butler, husband of Gwendoline Butler. He is buried at St John-at-Hampstead in the churchyard.

== Inner life ==
"I suspect – but you mustn't tell anybody – that I was born out of Jane Austen by Apuleius." E. H. W. M.

The Daily Telegraph commenting on Meyerstein's autobiography "Of My Early Life" noted "Out of this strange obsessed life came strange obsessed novels and poems which could have been written by nobody else". John Wain in his own autobiography "Sprightly Running", recalled of the neurotic poet that he emerged from Oxford with a backward looking, almost Johnsonian determination to dig in and cherish the old values while the tide of modernism swept over him. He described him as a disconcerting friend, with a taste for rather cruel or sinister jokes and recorded some strange miserly habits such as reusing old Christmas cards. Meyerstein himself in his autobiography makes no secret of his taste for flagellation. His editor Rowland Watson quotes a letter recording a beating by an assistant master at his Prep school (a good-looking Bristolian). While the master said his conceit must be whipped out of him, Meyerstein comments "Poor man – he was only whipping it in, had he but known". His passion for collecting extended to an extraordinary collection of whips from many countries, which were discovered under his bed after his death and burned.

== Works ==
- Symphonies (1915) poems
- Grobo (1925) novel
- The Pleasure Lover: Being some account of the early life and fortunes of Terence Duke (1925)
- Terence in Love (1928) novel
- A Life of Thomas Chatterton (1930)
- New Symphonies (1933) poems
- The Pageant and Other Stories (1934)
- Terence Duke (1935) novel in three parts, incorporating the earlier The Pleasure Lover and Terence in Love
- Selected Poems (1935)
- Séraphine (1936, Richards Press) novel
- A Boy of Clare (1937) poems
- Joshua Slade (1938) novel
- Four People (1939) three novellas
- Eclogues (1941, Richards Press) poems
- Adventures by Sea of Edward Coxere (1945) editor
- The Delphic Charioteer (1951) poems
- Robin Wastraw (1951) novel
- Tom Tallion (1952) novel
- Phoebe Thirsk (1953) novel
- Verse Letters to Five Friends (1954)
- Of My Early Life (1957) autobiography
- Bollond and Other Stories (1958)
- Some Poems (1960)

== See also ==
- Thomas Moult The Best Poems of 1931
- John Gawsworth Edwardian Poets (1936)
- Poems of Today 1938 3rd Series

== Bibliography ==
- Some Letters of E. H. W. Meyerstein (1959) Rowland Leonard Watson
- Lionel Butler, E. H. W. Meyerstein 1889–1952 (Chatterton Lecture)
- Poems of Today, third series (1938), p. xxviii.
