= D. M. Sutherland =

British journalist (1875 – 1951)

- Born: 24 June 1875; Edinburgh, Scotland
- Died: 13 December 1951 (aged 76); Midhurst, Sussex
- Education: University of Edinburgh
- Occupation(s): Journalist, editor
- Spouse: Dorothy Dehane (m. 1908)
- Children: One daughter

David Macleod Sutherland (24 June 1875 – 13 December 1951) was a British journalist and editor.

== Biography ==
Born in Edinburgh, he attended George Watson's College and University of Edinburgh. He was the London editor of the Manchester Daily Dispatch before assuming the editorship of the Sheffield Daily Telegraph. He was named editor of Evening Standard in 1914 and served in that capacity for a year, leaving to take over as editor of the Pall Mall Gazette. Sutherland was the last editor of the Pall Mall Gazette, serving in that position until the newspaper was incorporated into the Evening Standard in 1923. He then left journalism to become the Secretary and Director of Propaganda for the Anti-Socialist and Anti-Communist Union.

Media offices
Preceded by James A. Kilpatrick	Editor of The Evening Standard; 1914–1915	Succeeded by Arthur Mann
Preceded by James Louis Garvin	Editor of Pall Mall Gazette; 1915–1923	Succeeded by Position abolished
