= The Quartier Latin =

1896–1899 art magazine

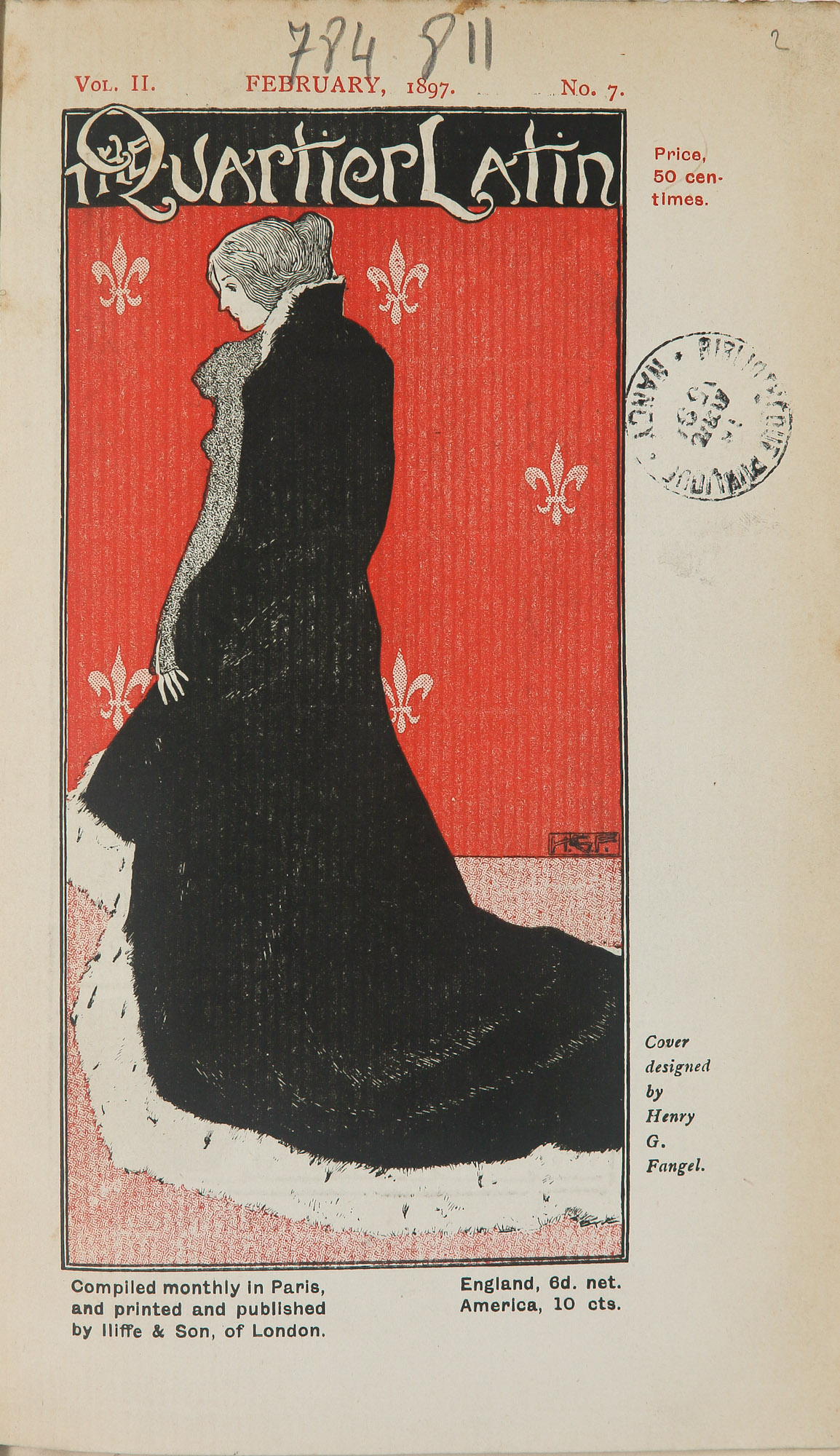
The cover of an 1897 issue of The Quartier Latin

The Quartier Latin was a magazine devoted to the arts, published monthly from 1896 until 1899. It was compiled in Paris by the American Art Association of Paris, an organization of American expatriates, and was simultaneously published in Paris, London, and New York City.

It was part of a brief fad for small-format, avant-garde little magazines (also known as chapbooks or ephemeral bibelots) around the turn of the twentieth century.

Its style and content have been described as being influenced by The Yellow Book and The Chap-Book, both of which debuted in 1894 and featured similar vivid modernist illustrations. An introduction to the first issue acknowledges as sister publications The Chap-Book, The Lotus, The Philistine, The Bibelot, The Lark, and The What-not.
