= Viola Garvin =

English poet and literary editor

Viola Gerard Garvin (1 January 1898 – January 1969) was an English poet and literary editor at The Observer.

== Life and career ==
Viola Garvin was born at Benwell on 1 January 1898, the eldest daughter of J. L. Garvin, later the long-time editor of The Observer; her older brother Gerard was killed in the First World War. She was named for Francis Thompson's "The Making of Viola" and for Viola Meynell, the subject of the poem. She was educated at South Hampstead High School and at Somerville College, Oxford, and then became assistant literary editor at The Observer in 1926; she later became literary editor, but was let go when her father's contract was not renewed in 1942. She also worked as a translator from the French: for example in 1930 of Jacques Chardonne's Eva and after leaving The Observer, of Romain Gary's Forest of Anger (1944), Rémy's The Messenger (1954) and Constantin de Grunwald's Peter the Great (1956).

In the 1920s and 1930s, she repeatedly went into debt. In the early 1930s she was in a relationship with Humbert Wolfe, a poet who also reviewed for The Observer, but he was married. She died in January 1969, aged 71.

== Publications ==
Garvin published one volume of poetry, Dedication (1928), and many translations from the French, from The Life of Solomon (1929) by Edmond Fleg, to The Schooner (1959) by Freddy Drilhon. She assisted in the preparation for Alfred M. Gollin's The Observer and J.L. Garvin, 1908-1914: A Study in Great Editorship (1960).
