= Virginia Moore =

Kentucky sign language interpreter

Virginia Moore (February 16, 1962, to May 6, 2023) was an American sign language interpreter. She was the executive director for the Kentucky Commission on the Deaf and Hard of Hearing who received media attention as the interpreter for Governor Andy Beshear's public briefings during the COVID-19 pandemic in Kentucky.

== Early life ==
Moore was raised in a deaf family, which deeply influenced her commitment to the cause. She held several degrees and certifications as an interpreter and was known for her approach and efforts to eliminate the stigma associated with hearing loss. Her work included helping deaf individuals navigate various challenges, such as taking driving exams, making doctor's appointments, and making emergency calls.

== Career ==
Moore began her career at the commission in 1995 and was appointed executive director in 2009. She served as the executive director of the Kentucky Commission on the Deaf and Hard of Hearing from 2009 until her death in 2023. Virginia was known for her work during the COVID-19 pandemic, where she interpreted Governor Andy Beshear's briefings, ensuring that information reached around 700,000 deaf and hard-of-hearing Kentuckians.

== Death and legacy ==
Moore announced her uterine cancer diagnosis on October 8, 2020, and underwent a hysterectomy. She returned to interpretation on November 30. She died of complications because of cancer on May 6, 2023.

Moore Safe Nights, a program formed by Moore's commission and the Division of Emergency Management was named after her in September 2024. The program plans to alert hard of hearing individuals to extreme weather. It offers custom weather radios with strobe light and pillow shaker attachments.
