= The Chap-Book =

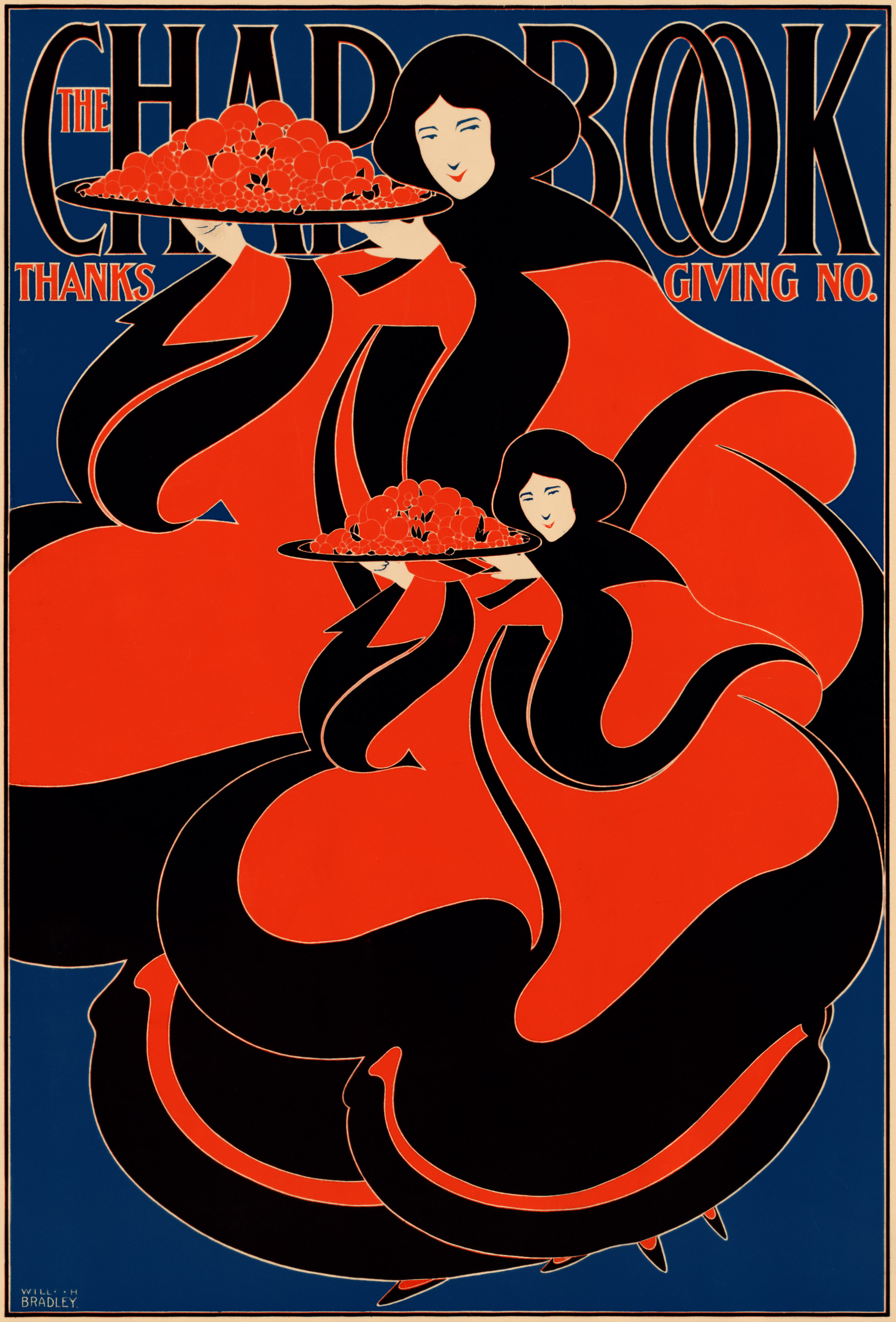
Cover of the Thanksgiving 1895 issue of The Chap-Book, designed by Will H. Bradley

The Chap-Book was an American literary magazine between 1894 and 1898. It is often classified as one of the first "little magazines" of the 1890s.

The first edition of The Chap-Book was dated 15 May 1894. Its editor was Herbert Stuart Stone and it was published by Stone and Kimball. It was originally published in Cambridge, Massachusetts, but after six months moved to Chicago, Illinois when Stone and Kimball relocated to Chicago.

The Chap-Book was published twice monthly. Its final issue was issued on 1 July 1898. After this, it merged with The Dial.

Contributors to The Chap-Book included Henry James, Hamlin Garland, Eugene Field, Bliss Carman, Julian Hawthorne, Max Beerbohm, W. E. Henley, H. G. Wells and William Sharp.
