= Joan Barton (poet) =

English poet and bookseller (1908–1986)

Joan Barton (1908–1986) was an English poet and bookseller. She was born in Bristol and studied at Colston's Girls' School and Bristol University. While working in a bookstore in Bristol, and later running her own in Marlborough, she corresponded with a number of poets who responded positively to her poetry and encouraged her to seek publication; these included John Betjeman, Walter de la Mare and Cecil Day-Lewis. A steadily increasing number of published poems led to her first collection, published when she was in her 60s; not long after, her poem "The Mistress" was included by Philip Larkin in The Oxford Book of Twentieth Century English Verse. In 1975, she was profiled by Anne Stevenson for the series The Living Poet on BBC Radio 3. She published two more collections, including a chapbook in 1979.

== Books ==
- The Mistress and Other Poems. Hull: Sonus Press, 1972.
- Ten Poems. Salisbury: Perdix Press, 1979.
- A House Under Old Sarum: New and Selected Poems. Liskeard: Harry Chambers/Peterloo Poets, 1981.
