= Herbert Sidney Palmer =

Canadian artist

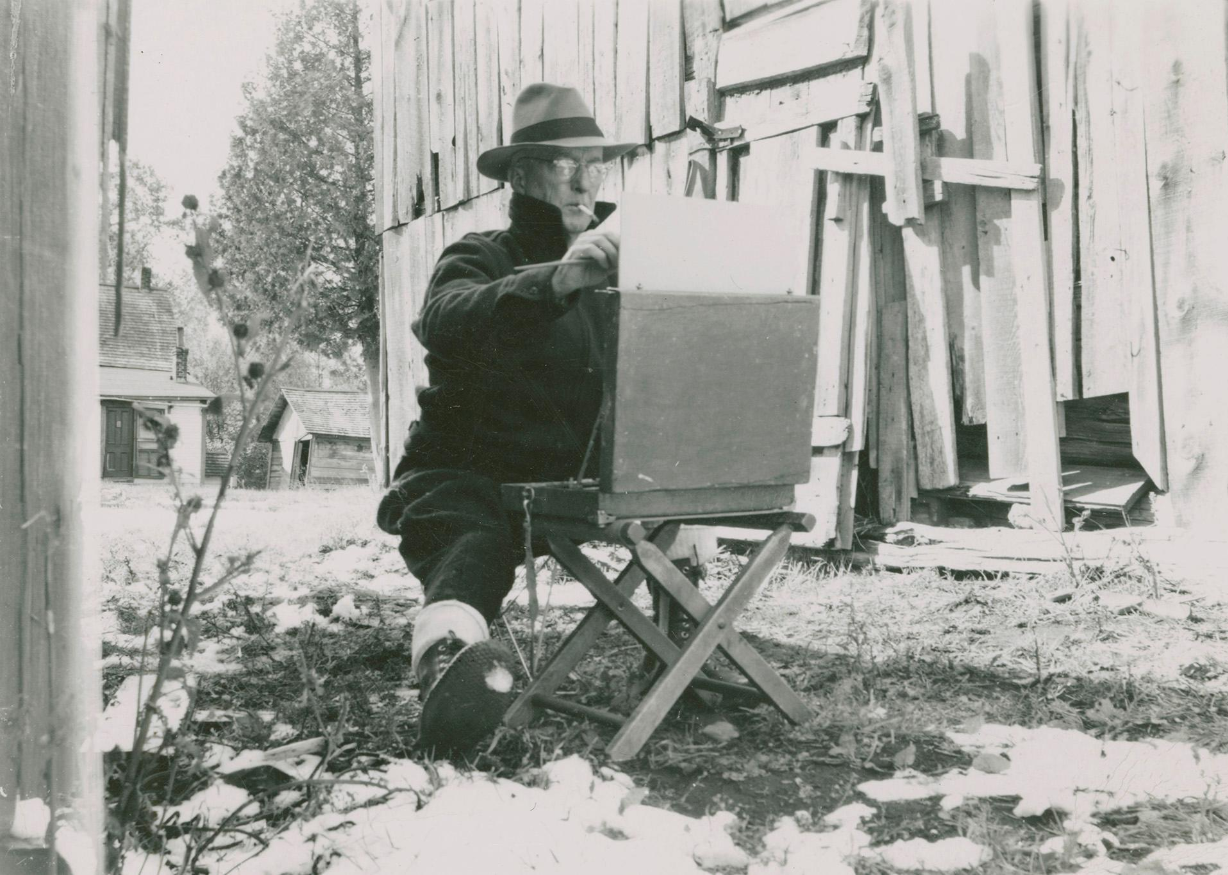
- Born: January 15, 1881; Toronto, Ontario, Canada
- Died: November 28, 1970 (aged 89)
- Known for: Landscape painter

Herbert Sidney Palmer RCA (June 15, 1881 – November 28, 1970) was a Canadian artist. He was best known as a landscape painter who captured Canadian scenes.

== Early life and education ==
Palmer was born in Toronto in 1881. From 1901 to 1905, he studied with Frederick S. Challener and J. W. Beatty at the Central Ontario School of Art in Toronto.

== Career ==
In 1929 he collaborated with the artist Frederick Haines on The Settlement of Canada, an eight-panel mural installed at the Canadian National Exhibition in the Dominion Government Building.

He was a secretary of the Royal Canadian Academy of Arts and the Ontario Society of Artists, and taught at the Ontario College of Art. He was a recipient of the Canadian Centennial Medal, and one of the founders of the Arts and Letters Club of Toronto.

== Collections ==
His work is included in the collections of the National Gallery of Canada and the Art Gallery of Guelph.
