= J. L. Garvin =

British journalist, editor and author

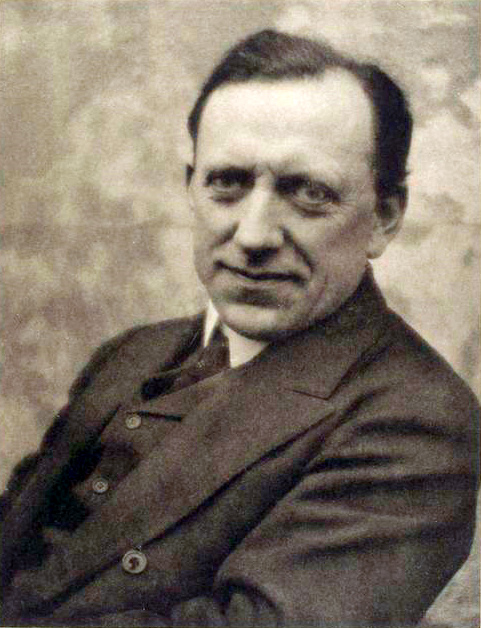
- James Louis Garvin in 1913
- Born: 12 April 1868; Birkenhead, Cheshire, England
- Died: 23 January 1947 (aged 78); Beaconsfield, Buckinghamshire, England
- Occupations: Journalist and editor
- Spouse(s): Christina Ellen Wilson (1894–1918); Viola Woods (1921–1947)
- Children: Roland Gerard Garvin; Viola Garvin; Una Garvin; Katherine Garvin; Ursula Garvin

James Louis Garvin CH (12 April 1868 – 23 January 1947) was a British journalist, editor, and author. In 1908, Garvin agreed to take over the editorship of the Sunday newspaper The Observer, revolutionising Sunday journalism and restoring the paper, which was facing financial troubles at the time, to profitability in the process.

== Youth and early years in journalism ==
The younger of two children, Garvin was born in Birkenhead. His father, Michael Garvin, was an impoverished Irish labourer who died at sea when Garvin was two, leaving him to be raised by his mother Catherine. Though a voracious reader, he left school at the age of thirteen and worked first as a messenger, then as a clerk. His elder brother, Michael, became a teacher; his status as the family's primary source of income led them to move, first in 1884 to Hull, then to Newcastle five years later.

Despite undergoing examination to join the civil service, from an early age Garvin yearned to become an editor. As a teenager he contributed letters and articles to the Eastern Morning News and the Dublin Weekly Freeman, much of which reflected his early advocacy for Home Rule. In 1891, Garvin applied to Joseph Cowen for a position at the Newcastle Evening Chronicle. Given a position as a proof-reader and occasional contributor, Garvin spent the next eight years honing his skills as a journalist, with Cowen serving as his mentor and father-figure. Yet Garvin yearned for a larger stage, and by the end of the decade he became a regular (though anonymous) contributor to the Fortnightly Review, then edited by W. L. Courtney.

Garvin's ambition extended beyond Newcastle, however. Through his association with Courtney, Garvin gained a position as a leader-writer for the Daily Telegraph in 1899. Moving to London, his writings on politics and literature soon earned him renown. By now his politics had changed, as he became a unionist and a follower of Joseph Chamberlain. In 1904, Garvin accepted the editorship of The Outlook, a weekly publication which was being turned into a platform for the promotion of Chamberlain's scheme of tariff reform. Though The Outlook quickly saw a rise in circulation and influence, its failure to turn a profit led to the paper's sale and Garvin's exit two years later.

== Pre-war editorship of The Observer ==
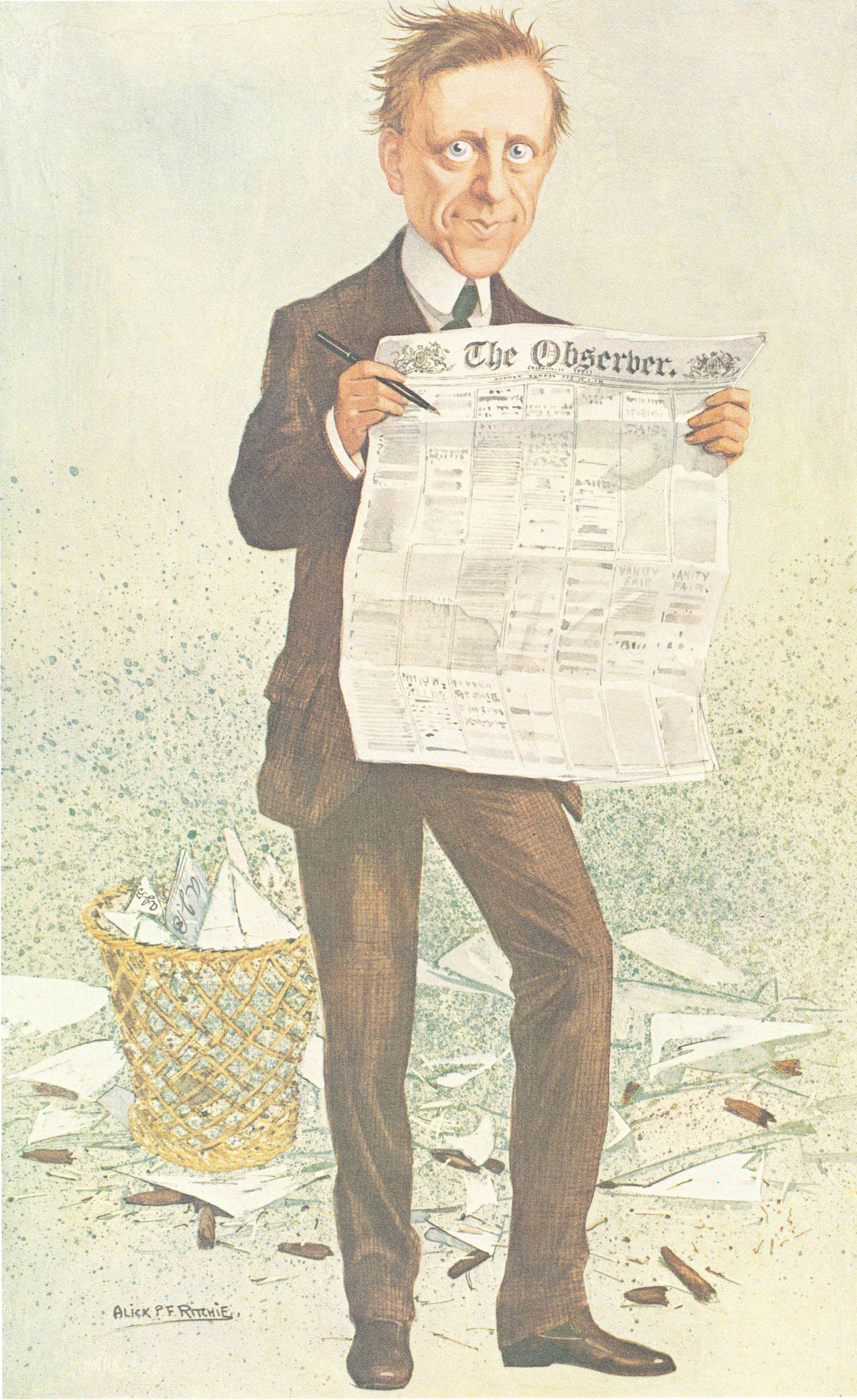
?-!, Vanity Fair, 1911

Soon after his departure from The Outlook, Garvin was approached by newspaper magnate Lord Northcliffe. Though he turned down a financially lucrative offer to write for Northcliffe's flagship publication, the Daily Mail, in 1908 Garvin agreed to take over the editorship of the historic Sunday newspaper The Observer. First published in 1791, the paper had recently faced financial troubles that led to its acquisition by Northcliffe. Within eighteen months, Garvin had reshaped The Observer, revolutionising Sunday journalism and restoring the paper to profitability in the process.

With the Unionist Party still recovering from its massive defeat in the general election of 1906, Garvin soon emerged as a dominant figure in Unionist politics. Using The Observer as a platform, he denounced the budget introduced by Chancellor of the Exchequer David Lloyd George in 1909, and he encouraged the Unionist-dominated House of Lords to veto it. As the question of Home Rule for Ireland increasingly overshadowed British politics, Garvin advocated a federalist solution to the problem.

By 1911, a rift had emerged between Garvin and Northcliffe over the critical issue of tariff reform. When their dispute became public, the press baron agreed to sell the paper to William Waldorf Astor, who accepted Garvin's proposal to assume editorship on condition that Garvin edit the Astor-owned Pall Mall Gazette as well. In 1915, Astor gave the two papers to his son, Waldorf as a birthday gift; Waldorf Astor then sold the Pall Mall Gazette, which allowed Garvin to leave his position with that paper and focus on editing The Observer.

== First World War ==
Despite being an admirer of German culture, Garvin was alarmed by the growing challenge the country posed to Britain in international politics. Through his friendship with First Sea Lord Admiral John Fisher, he gained access to inside information on naval matters which he used to inform editorials calling for a greater naval construction programme. When war broke out in 1914, Garvin embraced Britain's involvement in the conflict. He was close to many people in power, most notably Fisher (who left retirement to return to his former position as First Sea Lord soon after the start of the conflict), Lloyd George, and Winston Churchill, and he enjoyed considerable influence during this period.

Yet the conflict brought great personal tragedy to Garvin. At the start of the war his only son Roland Gerard Garvin (known to his family as "Ged") enlisted with the South Lancashire Regiment and was shipped to France. Though subsequently assigned a staff position, Ged transferred back to a combat posting soon after the start of the Somme campaign and was killed in a night assault on German line in late July. Heartbroken at the loss, Garvin never recovered from Ged's death, and it shaped many of his attitudes to subsequent events.

Despite his bitterness towards the Germans, Garvin believed in the need for a just settlement of the war. Soon after the armistice he published his first book, The Economic Foundations of Peace, in which he called for a lenient treaty and Anglo-American co-operation as the cornerstone for an effective League of Nations. When the punitive terms of the Treaty of Versailles were published, he denounced it in an editorial as leaving the Germans "no real hope except in revenge."

== Later years ==
In 1921, Garvin moved from London to Beaconsfield. From there, in a home once owned by Edmund Burke's agent he continued to edit The Observer, and he began work on a biography of his hero Joseph Chamberlain. Though three volumes of the Chamberlain biography were published in the early 1930s, Garvin never wrote the final fourth volume, and the project was completed after his death by Julian Amery. During this period Garvin also served as editor-in-chief of the fourteenth edition of the Encyclopædia Britannica (1926–1932).

Yet Garvin's stature as a man of letters masked his declining influence during this period. Working from Beaconsfield cut him off from much of the political life of the British capital. A new generation of British politicians emerged with whom Garvin had few connections. Alarmed by Adolf Hitler's rise to power in Germany, he pushed for a programme of rearmament. He also became an advocate of appeasement, both of Hitler and Benito Mussolini in an effort to win the Italian leader's support for an alliance.

Saddened by the outbreak of war in September 1939, Garvin nonetheless was a strong supporter of the war effort. Heartened by Churchill's return to the Admiralty, Garvin offered unflinching support for his old friend after he became Prime Minister in May 1940. Such support created a rift between Garvin and Astor. Though the two had been of like mind regarding appeasement, Astor opposed the concentration of war powers in Churchill's hands. Adding to the tension was Astor's son David, whose attempts to inject a more liberal tone into the newspaper were viewed by Garvin as an effort to criticise the Prime Minister. As a result, when Garvin published an editorial in February 1942 in support of Churchill remaining in office as Minister of Defence as well as Prime Minister, the Astors viewed it as a breach of their contract and requested Garvin's resignation.

Garvin was appointed a Member of the Order of the Companions of Honour in the 1941 New Year's Honours List. He had previously declined honours from Lloyd George in 1918, and Ramsay MacDonald in 1929.

Garvin quickly received, and accepted, an offer from Lord Beaverbrook to write a weekly column for his newspaper the Sunday Express. Switching to The Daily Telegraph in January 1945, Garvin continued to write a weekly column until just prior to his death from pneumonia at the age of 78.

== Personal life ==
Garvin was married twice. In 1894 he married Christina Ellen Wilson, with whom he had five children, one son, Ged, and four daughters, Viola, Una, Katherine, and Ursula. After Christina's death in 1918, Garvin married Viola Woods (née Taylor), the former wife of Unionist politician Maurice Woods.

== Works ==
- The Economic Foundations of Peace: or world partnership as the truer basis of the League of Nations. Macmillan and Co. 1919.
- The Life of Joseph Chamberlain. Macmillan and Co. April 1932.
- "The Maintenance of Empire" . The Empire and the century. London: John Murray. 1905. pp. 69–143.

Media offices
| Preceded by Frederick Higginbottom | Editor of The Pall Mall Gazette; 1912–1915 | Succeeded by D. M. Sutherland |
| Preceded by Austin Harrison | Editor of The Observer; 1908–1942 | Succeeded by Ivor Brown |
