= Ruth Pitter =

English poet (1897–1992)

Ruth Pitter CBE, FRSL
- Born: 7 November 1897; Ilford, England
- Died: February 29, 1992 (aged 94)
- Other name: Emma Thomas Pitter
- Occupation: Poet
- Awards: Hawthornden Prize; Queen's Gold Medal for Poetry

Ruth Pitter (alternatively Emma Thomas Pitter), CBE, FRSL (7 November 1897 – 29 February 1992) was a British poet.

She was the first woman to receive the Queen's Gold Medal for Poetry in 1955, and was appointed CBE in 1979 to honour her many contributions to English literature. In 1974, she was named a "Companion of Literature", the highest honour given by the Royal Society of Literature.

== Early life and education ==
Pitter was born in Ilford, eldest of three children of George Pitter (1862–1926) and his wife Louisa Rosetta Rosamund (née Murrell; 1869–1941), both assistant teachers in the East End of London. She grew up in "poor surroundings", but "her childhood was transfigured" by discovering Hainault Forest, which she considered "magical". Her birth certificate reports her given name simply as "Ruth." She was educated at the Coborn School, Bow.

== Career ==
Pitter was employed at the War Office from 1915 to 1917, later working as a painter at a furniture company in Suffolk, Walberswick Peasant Pottery Co., where she remained until 1930. In Suffolk, she befriended Richard and Ida Blair at Southwold, the parents of George Orwell, and later helped Orwell find lodgings in London in 1927, taking a vague interest in his writing, of which she was generally critical.

Later, Pitter and her lifelong good friend, Kathleen O'Hara, operated Deane and Forester, a small firm that specialised in decorative, painted furniture. The business closed when World War II began. Pitter took work in a factory. After the war, she and O'Hara opened a small business painting trays. Pitter was skilful at the flower-painting used in both furniture and tray decorating.

From 1946 to 1972, she was often a guest on BBC radio programmes, and from 1956 to 1960 she appeared regularly on the BBC's The Brains Trust, one of the first television talk programmes.

== Poet ==
Pitter began writing poetry early in life under the influence of her schoolteacher parents. In 1920, she published her first book of poetry with the help of Hilaire Belloc. Despite her business and factory work, Pitter managed to spend a few hours a day writing poetry.

She went on to publish 18 volumes of new and collected verse over a 70-year career as a published poet. Many of her volumes met with some critical and financial success.

She received the Hawthornden Prize in 1937 for A Trophy of Arms, published the previous year. In 1954 she won the William E. Heinemann Award for her book The Ermine (Cresset Press, 1953).

== Style, Influences and Legacy ==
Pitter was a traditionalist poet; she avoided most of the experimentations of modern verse and preferred the meter and rhyme schemes of the 19th century. One critic has described her and her poetry thus:

Pitter, in contrast to T. S. Eliot, Ezra Pound, and W. H. Auden, is a traditional poet in the line of George Herbert, Thomas Traherne, Thomas Hardy, A. E. Housman, W. B. Yeats, and Philip Larkin. Unlike the modernists, she rarely experiments with meter or verse form, nor does she explore modernist themes or offer critiques of modern English society. Instead, she works with familiar meters and verse forms, and her reluctance to alter her voice to follow in the modernist line explains in part why critics have overlooked her poetry. She is not trendy, avant-garde, nor, thankfully, impenetrable.

— Don King, "The religious poetry of Ruth Pitter", Christianity and Literature, 22 June 2005

Because of this, Pitter was frequently overlooked by critics of her day, and has only in recent years been seen as important: her reputation was helped by Larkin's respect for her poetry (he included four of her poems in The Oxford Book of Twentieth Century English Verse).

She was a good friend of C. S. Lewis, who admired her poetry and once said, according to his friend and biographer George Sayer, that if he was the kind of man who got married, he would have wanted to marry Ruth Pitter. In correspondence between the two, Lewis often critiqued her work and made suggestions. More often he invited her critique of his poems. Pitter is considered by many Lewis scholars to have had an effect on his writing in the 1940s and 1950s.

W. B. Yeats, Robin Skelton and Thom Gunn also appreciated Pitter's work and praised her poetry. Lord David Cecil once remarked that Pitter was one of the most original and moving poets then living. Composer Beryl Price used Pitter’s text in her composition A Cycle of Cats.

Pitter's work continues to be published in anthologies, including:

- The Faber Book of 20th Century Women's Poetry, ed. Fleur Adcock (London: Faber & Faber, 1987), where her "The Sparrow's Skull" and "Morning Glory" appear (pp. 77–78).
- More Poetry Please! 100 Popular Poems from the BBC Radio 4 Programme (London: Everyman, 1988), where her "The Rude Potato" appears (pp. 101–02).
- The Oxford Book of Garden Verse, ed. John Dixon Hunt (Oxford: Oxford University Press, 1993), where her "The Diehards" and "Other People's Glasshouses" appear (pp. 236–41).
- The Norton Anthology of Literature by Women: The Traditions in English, 2nd edition, eds. Sandra M. Gilbert and Susan Gubar (New York: Norton, 1996 [1985]), where her "The Military Harpist", "The Irish Patriarch", "Old Nelly's Birthday", and "Yorkshire Wife's Saga" appear (pp. 1573–77).
- The New Penguin Book of English Verse, ed. Paul Keegan (London: Allen Lane, Penguin Press, 2000), where her "But for Lust" appears (p. 962).

== Christian faith influences ==
Pitter described her spiritual debt to C. S. Lewis:

As to my faith, I owe it to C. S. Lewis. For much of my life I lived more or less as a Bohemian, but when the second war broke out, Lewis broadcast several times, and also published some little books (notably "The Screwtape Letters"), and I was fairly hooked. I came to know him personally, and he came here several times. Lewis's stories, so very entertaining but always about the war between good and evil, became a permanent part of my mental and spiritual equipment.

— Letter, Ruth Pitter to Andrew Nye, dated 18 May 1985.

Did I tell you I'd taken to Christianity? Yes, I went & got confirmed a year ago or more. I was driven to it by the pull of C. S. Lewis and the push of misery. Straight prayer book Anglican, nothing fancy [...] I realize what a tremendous thing it is to take on, but I can't imagine turning back. It cancels a great many of one's miseries at once, of course: but it brings great liabilities, too.

— Letter, Ruth Pitter to Nettle Palmer, dated 1 January 1948.

== Bibliography of works ==
- First Poems. London: Cecil Palmer, 1920.
- First and Second Poems. London: Sheed & Ward, 1927.
- Persephone in Hades. Privately printed, 1931.
- A Mad Lady's Garland. London: Cresset Press, 1934.
- A Trophy of Arms: Poems 1926–1935. London: Cresset Press, 1936 (winner of the Hawthornden Prize in 1937).
- The Spirit Watches. London: Cresset Press, 1939.
- The Rude Potato. London: Cresset Press, 1941.
- Poem. Southampton: Shirley Press, 1943.
- The Bridge. Poems 1939–1944. London: Cresset Press, 1945.
- Pitter on Cats. London: Cresset Press, 1946.
- Urania (Selections from A Trophy of Arms, The Spirit Watches and The Bridge. London: Cresset Press, 1950.
- The Ermine: Poems 1942–1952. London: Cresset Press, 1953 (winner of the William Heinemann Award: Queen's Gold Medal for Poetry, 1955).
- Still by Choice. London: Cresset Press, 1966.
- Poems 1926–1966. London: Barrie & Rockliff/Cresset Press, 1968.
- End of Drought. London: Barrie & Jenkins, 1975.
- A Heaven to Find. London: Enitharmon Press, 1987.
- Collected Poems: 1990. Petersfield: Enitharmon, 1990.
- Collected Poems. London: Enitharmon, 1996.
- The Letters of Ruth Pitter: Silent Music. Edited by Don W. King. Newark: University of Delaware Press, 2014.
