= Clifford Dyment =

British poet, literary critic, editor and journalist

Clifford Henry Dyment FRSL (20 January 1914 – 5 June 1971) was a British poet, literary critic, editor and journalist, best known for his poems on countryside topics. Born to Welsh parents, his mother was widowed when Dyment was four years old.

Born in Alfreton, Derbyshire, he spent his early childhood in Caerleon-on-Usk but was educated at Loughborough Grammar School in Leicestershire.

His poem "The Son" was occasioned by his discovery of a letter written by his conscripted father prior to his death in World War I. Another Dyment poem "From Many a Mangled Truth a War is Won" laments the tendency to invent pretexts and justifications for wars.

His first published collection was First Day (1935). During the latter part of the 1930s he was a literary figure in London. During World War II he was engaged to make films, working for the British government. His poem As a boy with a richness of needs I wandered was included by Philip Larkin in The Oxford Book of Twentieth Century English Verse, in 1971.

The poem Mouse was set to music by Betty Roe as part of her song cycle of Cat and Mouse (1987).

He received a Rockefeller Foundation Atlantic Award in 1950.

== Works ==
- First Day (1935)
- Straight or Curly (1937)
- The Axe in the Wood (1944)
- Thomas Hood, Selected Poems (1948, Grey Walls Press) editor
- Poems 1935–1948 (1949)
- Experiences and Places (1955)
- The Railway Game: An Early Autobiography (1962)
- C. Day-Lewis (1963 biography)
- Collected Poems (1970)

'The Encounter'
