= Lilian Bowes Lyon =

British poet (1895–1949)

Lilian Helen Bowes Lyon (23 December 1895 – 25 July 1949) was a British novelist and poet.

== Biography ==
Born 23 December 1895 at Ridley Hall, Northumberland. She was the youngest daughter of the Honourable Francis Bowes-Lyon, son of the 13th Earl of Strathmore and Kinghorne. Her mother was Lady Anne Lindsay, daughter of the 25th Earl of Crawford. Lilian was a first cousin of Elizabeth Bowes-Lyon, who later became Queen Elizabeth the Queen Mother.

During the First World War, Bowes Lyon helped at Glamis Castle (owned by her uncle) which became a convalescence home for soldiers. Her brother Charles Bowes Lyon was killed in the war on 23 October 1914, inspiring her poem "Battlefield" which was later published in Bright Feather Fading.

After the Great War, Bowes Lyon studied for a time at the University of Oxford and then moved to London. She was independently wealthy. In 1929, she met the writer William Plomer CBE and through him, Laurens van der Post. She published two novels, The Buried Stream (1929) and Under the Spreading Tree (1931) but thereafter focused on poetry. Bowes Lyon published six individual collections with Jonathan Cape and a Collected Poems in 1948. Her "Collected Poems" contains an introduction by C. Day-Lewis, who noted the influences of Emily Dickinson, Hopkins and Christina Rossetti. Her verse appeared in many periodicals and anthologies including The Adelphi, Country Life, Kingdom Come, The Listener, The London Mercury, The Lyric (USA), The Observer, Orion, Punch, The Spectator, Time and Tide and "Poetry" (USA).

During the Second World War, Bowes Lyon moved to the East End of London, where she used the Tilbury Docks unofficial air raid shelter and assisted with nursing the injured.

She had several amputations due to thromboangiitis obliterans (Buerger's disease), losing toes, a foot, her lower legs and eventually both her legs below her hips. She returned to her home in Kensington and continued to write poetry despite the thromboangiitis obliterans beginning to affect her hands. These poems, found amongst William Plomer's papers at University of Durham, were published in "Uncollected Poems" by Tragara Press.

She died on 25 July 1949.

== Works ==
- The Buried Stream (Jonathan Cape, 1929) novel
- Under the Spreading Tree (Jonathan Cape, 1931) novel as D J Cotman
- The White Hare (Jonathan Cape, 1934) poems
- Bright Feather Fading (Jonathan Cape, 1936) poems
- Tomorrow is a Revealing (Jonathan Cape, 1941) poems
- Evening in Stepney (Jonathan Cape, 1943) poems
- A Rough Walk Home (Jonathan Cape, 1946) poems
- Collected Poems (Jonathan Cape, 1948)
- Uncollected Poems (Tragara Press, 1981)
