= Herbert Edward Palmer =

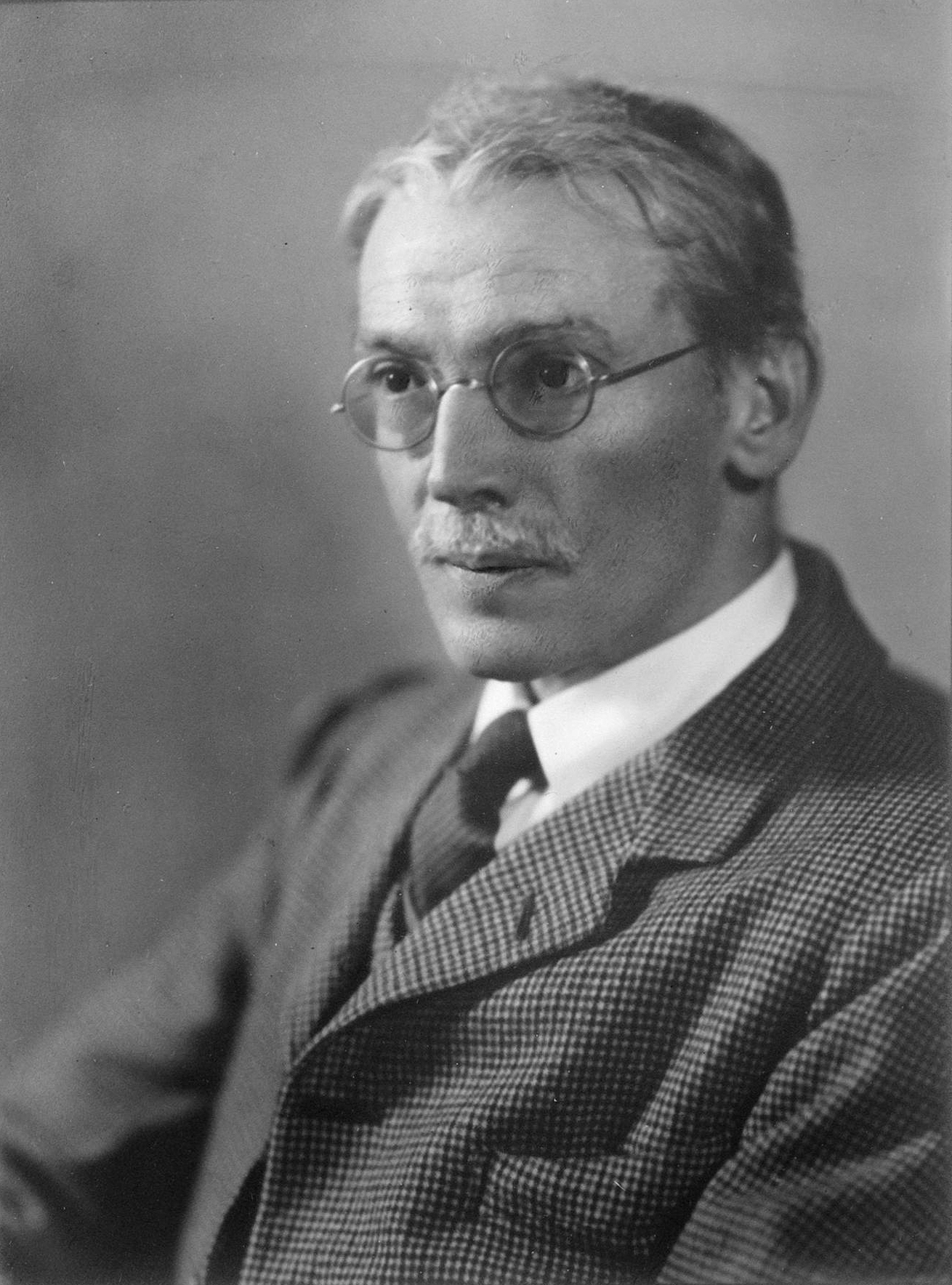
- Herbert Edward Palmer (Elliott & Fry, late 1930s)
- Born: 10 February 1880; Market Rasen, Lincolnshire, UK
- Died: 17 May 1961 (aged 81)
- Education: Woodhouse Grove School; Birmingham University; Bonn University
- Occupations: Poet, literary critic

Herbert Edward Palmer (10 February 1880 – 17 May 1961) was an English poet and literary critic.

He was born in Market Rasen, Lincolnshire, and educated at Woodhouse Grove School, Birmingham University and Bonn University. Before becoming a full-time writer and journalist in 1921, he led an itinerant life in teaching, tutoring, and lecturing, working in particular for the W.E.A.; and spending many years in France and Germany.

He encouraged the young John Gawsworth. He introduced C. S. Lewis and Ruth Pitter in 1945/6.

== Works ==
- Two Fishers, and other poems (1918)
- Two Foemen, and other poems (1920)
- Two Minstrels: the Wolf Knight, his book; The Wolf Minstrel, Caedmon's Book (1921)
- The Unknown Warrior, and other poems (1924)
- Songs of Salvation, Sin and Satire (1925)
- The Judgement of François Villon: a pageant-episode play in five acts (1927)
- Christmas Miniature (1928)
- The Armed Muse: poems (1930)
- Jonah Comes To Nineveh: A Ballad (1930)
- The Teaching of English (1930)
- Cinder Thursday (1931)
- Thirty Poems (1931)
- What the Public Wants (1932) Blue Moon booklet
- Collected Poems (1933)
- The Roving Angler (1933) essays, revised edition 1947
- Summit and Chasm: a book of poems and rimes (1934)
- The Mistletoe Child: an autobiography of childhood (1935)
- The Vampire, and other poems and rimes of a pilgrim's progress (1936)
- Post-Victorian Poetry (1938) criticism
- The Gallows-Cross: a book of songs and verses for the times (1940)
- Season and Festival (1943) Faber and Faber, poems
- The Dragon of Tingalam: a fairy comedy (1945)
- A Sword in the Desert: a book of poems and verses for the present times (1946)
- The Greenwood Anthology of New Verse (1948), compiled by Palmer
- The Old Knight: a poem-sequence for the present times (1949)
- The Ride from Hell: a poem-sequence of the times for three voices (1958)
