= George Sutherland Fraser =

British poet

- Born: 8 November 1915; Glasgow, Scotland
- Died: 3 January 1980 (aged 64)
- Occupations: Poet, literary critic, academic
- Spouse: Eileen Lucy (Paddy) Andrew (m. 1946)
- Children: 3

George Sutherland Fraser (8 November 1915 – 3 January 1980) was a Scottish poet, literary critic and academic.

== Early life ==
Fraser was born in Glasgow, Scotland, later moving with his family to Aberdeen. He attended the University of St. Andrews, where he read History and English.

During World War II, he served in the British Army in Cairo and Eritrea. He was published as a poet in Salamander, a Cairo literary magazine. At the same time, he was involved with the New Apocalyptics group, writing an introductory essay for the anthology The White Horseman, and formulating as well as anyone did the idea that they were successors to surrealism.

== Career ==
After the war, he became a prominent figure in London's literary circles, working as a journalist and critic. Together with his wife Paddy, he made friends with a gamut of literary figures, from the intellectual leader William Empson to the eccentric John Gawsworth. He worked with Ian Fletcher to have Gawsworth's Collected Poems (1949) published. Fraser's direction was that of the traditional man of letters (soon to become extinct).

In 1948, Fraser contributed an essay entitled "A Language by Itself" to a biblio-symposium honouring the 60th birthday of T. S. Eliot. Drawing comparisons with John Donne, Fraser praised the poet's profound refreshment (particularly in The Love Song of J. Alfred Prufrock) of the English poetic tongue, together with his subtle facility for transitional verse and his potent effect on the poetic youth; but, more importantly for present purposes, he also confessed: "I am not a very original writer myself; I am lost, on the whole, without a convention of some sort [...]."

In 1949, he accepted the job of replacing Edmund Blunden as Cultural Adviser to the UK Liaison Mission in Tokyo. This ended badly when Fraser suffered a breakdown in 1951 while in Japan. Subsequently, he was much less the poet than the all-purpose writer.

In 1959, he became a lecturer at the University of Leicester, remaining there until retirement in 1979.

== Personal life ==
In 1946, Fraser married Eileen Lucy Andrew (who was known as Paddy from birth). She wrote a brief memoir of her life with Fraser: G. S. Fraser: A Memoir. Together they had two daughters, including Helen Fraser, and a son. Paddy died in 2013.

== Books ==
- The Fatal Landscape and Other Poems (1941)
- Home Town Elegy (1944)
- The Traveller has Regrets and Other Poems (1948)
- Vision of Scotland (1948)
- The Dedicated Life In Poetry, by Patrice de La Tour du Pin (translation, 1948)
- News from South America (1949)
- Leaves without a Tree (1953)
- The Modern Writer and his World (1953, revised edition 1964)
- Springtime (poetry anthology, 1953), edited with Ian Fletcher
- W. B. Yeats (1954)
- Scotland (1955) with Edwin Smith
- Poetry now: an anthology edited by G. S. Fraser (1956), Faber & Faber
- Dylan Thomas (1957)
- Vision and Rhetoric. Studies in Modern Poetry (1959)
- Ezra Pound (1960)
- Keith Douglas. Collected Poems (Second Edition, 1966), edited with John Waller and J. C. Hall.
- Lawrence Durrell. A Study (1968), with a bibliography by Alan G. Thomas
- Conditions (1969)
- Metre, Rhyme and Free Verse (1970)
- John Keats: Odes (1971), edited
- P. H. Newby (1974)
- Essays on Twentieth Century Poets (1977)
- Alexander Pope (1978)
- Return to Oasis: War Poems and Recollections from the Middle East, 1940–1946 (1980), edited with Victor Selwyn, Erik de Mauny, Ian Fletcher, and John Waller
- Poems of G.S. Fraser (1981), editors Ian Fletcher and John Lucas, Leicester University Press
- A Short History of English Poetry 1981
- A Stranger and Afraid: Autobiography of an Intellectual (1983), Carcanet Press

== Poets in Poetry Now (1956) ==
A. Alvarez - Kingsley Amis - W. G. Archer - Patricia Avis - Bernard Bergonzi - Thomas Blackburn - Arthur Boyars - Alan Brownjohn - George Bruce - Charles Causley - Robert Conquest - Hilary Corke - Maurice James Craig - Donald Davie - Paul Dehn - Keith Douglas - Lawrence Durrell - D. J. Enright - Ian Fletcher - Roy Fuller - Robert Garioch - David Gascoyne - W. S. Graham - Thom Gunn - J. C. Hall - Michael Hamburger - Jacquetta Hawkes - John Heath-Stubbs - Geoffrey Hill - John Holloway - Elizabeth Jennings - Peter Johnson - Sidney Keyes - Thomas Kinsella - James Kirkup - Philip Larkin - Laurie Lee - Alun Lewis - Christopher Logue - Rob Lyle - George MacBeth - Norman MacCaig - Mairi MacInnes - Ewart Milne - Richard Murphy - Norman Nicholson - Kathleen Nott - Philip Oakes - Jonathan Price - F. T. Prince - Henry Reed - Anne Ridler - W. R. Rodgers - Alan Ross - E. J. Scovell - Tom Scott - Martin Seymour-Smith - John Short - Jon Silkin - Burns Singer - Robin Skelton - Sydney Goodsir Smith - Bernard Spencer - R. S. Thomas - Terence Tiller - Charles Tomlinson - Constantine Trypanis - John Wain - John Waller - Vernon Watkins - Gordon Wharton - Sheila Wingfield - Diana Witherby - David Wright

== Bibliography ==
- Fraser, George Sutherland. "A Language by Itself." In T. S. Eliot: A Symposium, edited by Richard March and Tambimuttu, 167–177. London: Editions Poetry, 1948.
