= Seán Jennett =

British typographer and author

Seán Jennett (12 November 1912 – 1981), also Sean Jennet, was a British typographer, book editor, and author of travel books. He was also a published poet. A copyright registration of 1943 describes as a pseudonym, giving his name as John Clark Jennett, living at Addlestone.

== Life ==
Jennett was from Yorkshire. In earlier life he was a typographer for Faber and Faber, who published his The Making of Books (1951).

Leaving Faber & Faber, Jennett worked for the Grey Walls Press with Wrey Gardiner. Gardiner wrote later of how Jennett redesigned Poetry Quarterly which he was editing in 1943, dealing with printers in the wartime conditions and boosting sales. Jennett consulted with T. S. Eliot and others at the time of the Ern Malley hoax of that year. He contributed to The Wind and the Rain, a literary magazine edited by Neville Braybrooke (1923–2001). A reviewer there wrote that "Jennett is at his best in the sonnets and in a five-line stanza of his own". He gave a talk "Convention and the Modern Book," on tradition in book design, on the BBC Third Programme in 1947.

Jennett was General Editor of the Crown Classics series published by Grey Walls Press from the later 1940s; it published 36 titles from 1947 to 1954. Roderick Cave commented on the standard of his work in what was a budget series of poetry reprints:

To set poetry effectively, so that the margins appear right whether the lines of the poems be long or short, is a lot harder than for prose. Writers like Morison, Simon, Meynell, Beatrice Wade — or Jennett — have often enough said how it should be done, but not many publishers of cheap series get it quite right. As a poet and as author of The Making of Books Jennett was particularly interested in getting this right, and the mise-en-page of most of the Crown Classics is very good.

Jennett redesigned Time and Tide magazine in 1952. He used earnings from The Making of Books to travel in France. This journey was the beginning of his career as a travel writer. He took two cameras with him, collecting black-and-white and colour photographs as illustration for his writings. He went on to edit The Travellers' Guides series for Darton, Longman & Todd in the 1960s. After that he published further travel books with Batsford Books, and guides for HMSO. The Pilgrim's Way: from Winchester to Canterbury (1971) was published by Cassell: the Esher News and Mail reported that Jennett, from Woking, had "walked every mile" of the Pilgrim's Way.

== Works ==
Poetry

- Always Adam (1943). "H. L. G." reviewing it in the Birmingham Daily Post wrote that "On the whole, Mr. Jennet is one of the new romantics, but there is plenty of Mr. Auden's influence apparent in diction and metre [...]".
- The Cloth of Flesh (1945)
- The Sun and Old Stones (1961)

Jennett was included in The Crown and the Sickle (1944), the third anthology associated with the New Apocalyptics movement. In the 1949 anthology The New British Poets by Kenneth Rexroth, the editor said in the introduction that his general survey did not apply to Jennett and some others chosen (Laurie Lee, Terence Tiller, Vernon Watkins, Eithne Wilkins). Writing to Derek Savage in 1947, Rexroth commented that Jennett "impresses me the more I see of him".

In 1948, an article in the Irish Independent, noting that Maurice Wollman's Poems of the War Years had name-checked Jennett's "Autumn, 1940" in the introduction but not included it, classed Jennett as an Irish poet. Jennett was in Contemporary Irish Poetry (1949) edited by Robert Greacen and Valentin Iremonger.

Translation

- Journal of a Younger Brother: The Life of Thomas Platter (1964); The Journal of Felix Platter : beloved son Felix; a medical student in Montpellier in the sixteenth century, transl. and introd. by Séan Jennett, with a forew. by Jack Lindsay, London : Muller, 1961

Other works

- The Making of Books (1951)
- Pioneers in Printing (1958)
- The Sun and Old Stones (1961), an account of camping in the Midi with his wife and two children.
- Deserts of England (1964). This work relates to the parts of upland England called the "Highland Zone" by Cyril Fox. It is a walkers' guide to Dartmoor and Exmoor, the Yorkshire Moors, the Forest of Bowland, the Cadair Berwyn area and the Long Mynd.
- A Family of Roses (1971) with Samuel McGredy IV.
