= Cairo poets =

Literary group based in Cairo, Egypt, during World War II

The British Army presence in Egypt in World War II had, as a side effect, the concentration of a group of Cairo poets. There had been a noticeable literary group in Cairo before the war in North Africa broke out, including university academics. Possibly as a reflection of that, there were two strands of literary activity and publication during the years 1942–1944. There was the Personal Landscape group centred on the publication of that name, founded by Lawrence Durrell, Robin Fedden and Bernard Spencer. There was also the Salamander group, which produced a magazine and the Oasis series of anthologies. To oversimplify, the first group produced poetic reputations, while the second, founded by servicemen, broadcast appeals and collected an archive of 17,000 poems written at the period.

Poets such as Terence Tiller and G. S. Fraser had a foot in both camps. Keith Douglas, the iconic war poet, was associated with the Personal Landscape group. Alan Rook, John Gawsworth and John Waller published in Salamander.

Several of the Cairo poets appeared in the 'Poets in Uniform' issue of Tambimuttu's Poetry London early in 1941.

An English literary presence persisted after the war, in the persons of P. H. Newby, Robert Liddell, Denys Johnson-Davies, Hilary Corke and D. J. Enright.

== Poets in Personal Landscape. An Anthology of Exile (1945) ==
Keith Douglas, Lawrence Durrell, Harold Edwards, Robin Fedden, G. S. Fraser, Diana Gould, Charles Johnston, Robert Liddell, Olivia Manning, Elie Papadimitiou, Hugh Gordon Porteus, George Seferis, Ruth Speirs, Bernard Spencer, Terence Tiller, David Gwyn Williams.
