= New Apocalyptics =

British poetry grouping in the 1940s

The New Apocalyptics were a poetry grouping in the United Kingdom in the 1940s, taking their name from the anthology The New Apocalypse (1939), which was edited by J. F. Hendry (1912–1986) and Henry Treece. There followed the further anthologies The White Horseman (1941) and The Crown and Sickle (1944).

Their reaction against the political realism of much of the Thirties poetry drew for support upon D. H. Lawrence (Apocalypse, 1931), surrealism, myth, and expressionism.

== Scottish connection ==
Others closely associated were the Scottish (as Hendry was) poets G. S. Fraser and Norman MacCaig, although the latter saw his work from Riding Lights (1955) onwards as part of "the long haul towards lucidity" after his Apocalyptic start.

There was quite an overlap with the Scottish Renaissance group of writers, though not necessarily by publication in London. Others sometimes mentioned in this connection include Ruthven Todd, Tom Scott, Hamish Henderson, Maurice Lindsay, Edwin Morgan, Burns Singer, and William Montgomerie. This grouping was fairly represented in Modern Scottish Poetry (1946). Welsh and Irish poets were also prominent.

== Others ==
The other poets in the three anthologies were Ian Bancroft, Alex Comfort, Dorian Cooke, John Gallen, Wrey Gardiner, Robert Greacen, Robert Herring, Seán Jennett, Nicholas Moore, Philip O'Connor, Leslie Phillips, Gervase Stewart, Dylan Thomas, Vernon Watkins, and Peter Wells.

== New Romantics ==
A broader movement of New Romantics has been postulated to cover many of the British poets between the Auden group of the 1930s and The Movement. This is much more debatable; it may be something of a flag of convenience for those such as the followers of Dylan Thomas and George Barker whose style marked them off, or on the other hand a tag for those addressed polemically and retrospectively by the Robert Conquest introduction to the New Lines anthology. The phrase New Romantics was used at the time, though, for example by Henry Treece; it is usually attributed to Cyril Connolly.

== Effects of the times ==
Wartime conditions had posed great editorial difficulties, and the London operations of the publishers such as Tambimuttu, Grey Walls Press and Fortune Press had been stopgaps.

Kenneth Rexroth produced a post-war anthology covering the period, but it had little circulation in the UK. Another view was that from John Lehmann's New Writing.

== Retrospect from the 1950s ==
By 1953 John Heath-Stubbs could write of the New Romantics as a movement of the past, though acutely singling out W. S. Graham under the heading of in it, though not of it. This was in the introduction to an anthology Images of Tomorrow, which also points out that the debate over the 'romanticism' was also a fissure within the Christian poets over style—indeed harking back to the religious and psychological depths of apocalypse.

== See also ==
- The New Poetry
