= Sir John Waller, 7th Baronet =

English poet

Sir John Waller
- Born: 27 July 1917
- Died: 22 January 1995 (aged 77); Ventnor, Isle of Wight
- Education: Weymouth College, Worcester College, Oxford
- Writing career
- Language: English
- Notable awards: Greenwood Award for Poetry in 1947; Keats Prize in 1974
- Movement: Cairo poets

Sir John Stanier Waller, 7th Baronet (27 July 1917 – 22 January 1995) was an English author, poet and journalist. He was one of the group of Cairo poets during World War II. He was the last of the Waller baronets of Braywick Lodge (1815).

== Life ==
Waller was the son of Captain Stanier Waller and Alice Harris, who was a barmaid before she married; Captain Waller died of wounds from the First World War. John was educated at Weymouth College and Worcester College, Oxford. In 1939, he founded the magazine Kingdom Come, which he edited.

Waller served in the Middle East from 1941 to 1946 and was initially with the Royal Army Service Corps. Then he was posted to the Ministry of Information, where his sergeant-major was the poet G. S. Fraser. During his time in Cairo, he founded the Salamander Society with Keith Bullen and John Cromer, and launched Oasis: the Middle East Anthology of Poetry from the Forces in August 1943.

After the war, Waller had a number of poetry collections published, such as The Merry Ghosts, Crusade and The Kiss of Stars. He edited books and was presented with the Greenwood Award for Poetry in 1947 and became a Fellow of the Royal Society of Literature in 1948. He was also Information Officer in the Overseas Press Division of the Central Office of Information. In 1954, on the death of Sir Edmund Waller, 6th Baronet, he inherited the baronetcy. However, he lost the inherited income he could access without an heir, as business ventures failed, and he gave up writing.

Waller was awarded the Keats Prize in 1974. In 1976, he helped set up the Salamander Oasis Trust. This was originally intended just to reprint Oasis, but Waller suggested collating as much as possible of the material that had not been used, which resulted in four anthologies.

He died at Ventnor, Isle of Wight on 22 January 1995.

== Private life ==
Waller lived in Isleworth, and was known both as "the sensitive man of literature", and "the hard-drinking, unashamed homosexual" who was not shy about his contacts with London underworld.

He inherited a 250,000GBP trust fund from Lady Viola Waller; however, the full sum was under condition that he would produce a male heir. Circa 1962 Waller started publicly looking for a bride, and in May 1964 he announced engagement to singer Brigitte Bond in the press. The engagement was called off in June 1964, and the news of Bond being a trans woman (and thus unable to bear children) was made public in press. In 1974 he married Anne Eileen Mileham, and they had a daughter. The marriage ended in divorce; Lady Waller was declared bankrupt in 1990, and Sir John died without ever receiving the full inheritance and ended the baronetcy line.

Baronetage of the United Kingdom
Preceded by Edmund Waller	Baronet (of Braywick Lodge); 1954–1995	Extinct
