= Salamander: A Miscellany of Poetry =

1947 poetry anthology

- Title page for Salamander: A Miscellany of Poetry (1969 edition)
- Author: George Allen
- Genre: Poetry
- Publication date: 1947

Salamander: A Miscellany of Poetry was an anthology of poetry published by George Allen and Unwin in 1947 and featuring the work of many of the Cairo poets. It was edited by Keith Bullen and John Cromer. The title alluded to the rebirth of culture from the ashes of World War II. It put itself forward as "a microcosm of world literature," but the sympathies of the editors were Georgian and Kiplingesque, and the aim of the Salamander Group was "to memorialize the soldier as amateur poet and oral historian."

Work by G. S. Fraser, Alan Rook, John Gawsworth and John Waller, as well as Bullen and Cromer, was published in Salamander.

== Notes ==
1. John Cromer, in the introduction.
2. Cambridge History, page 425.
3. Bowen, op. cit. page 47
