= The Real Life of Sebastian Knight =

1941 novel by Vladimir Nabokov

- Cover of the first edition
- Author: Vladimir Nabokov
- Language: English
- Publisher: New Directions Publishers (US); Editions Poetry London (UK)
- Publication date: 1941 (US); 1945 (UK)
- Publication place: Norfolk, Connecticut (US); London, England (UK)
- Pages: 205 (US); 181 (UK)
- OCLC: 2381791

The Real Life of Sebastian Knight is the first English-language novel by Vladimir Nabokov, written from late 1938 to early 1939 in Paris and first published in 1941. A work centred on language and its inability to convey any satisfactory definition, it has been identified as a forerunner of the postmodernist novel.

== A new start ==
Nabokov's first major work in English was written hastily in Paris while the author sat in the bathroom, his valise set across a bidet as a writing desk. It had been preceded by nine earlier novels in Russian, written under the pen name V. Sirin, and shares with them a preoccupation with the problems of living in exile and of adaptation. This, Nabokov's first novel under his own name, was published by New Directions Publishers in the US and by Editions Poetry London in the UK, in 1941 and 1945 respectively, selling slowly. After the success of Lolita it was republished in 1959, this time to wide critical acclaim.

== Plot summary ==
The narrator, V., is absorbed in the composition of his first literary work, a biography of his half-brother, the Russian-born English novelist Sebastian Knight (1899–1936). In the course of his quest he tracks down Sebastian's contemporaries at Cambridge and interviews other friends and acquaintances. In the course of his work V. also surveys Sebastian's books (see below) and attempts to refute the views of the "misleading" The Tragedy of Sebastian Knight, a biography by Knight's former secretary Mr. Goodman, who maintains that Knight was too aloof and cut off from real life.

V. concludes that, after a long-running romantic relationship with Clare Bishop, Sebastian's final years were embittered by a love affair with another woman — a Russian whom he presumably met at a hotel in Blauberg, where Sebastian spent time recuperating from a heart ailment in June 1929. V. leaves for Blauberg, where, with the help of a private detective, he acquires a list of the names of four women who were staying at the hotel at the same time as Sebastian and tracks down each to interview them. After dismissing the possibility of Helene Grinstein in Berlin, his search leads him to Paris and the list narrows to two candidates: Mme de Rechnoy and Mme von Graun.

V. first suspects Mme de Rechnoy of being the mystery woman, based on a compelling description from her ex-husband, Pahl Palich Rechnoy. Mme de Rechnoy has left her husband and cannot be located, leaving V. unsatisfied. However, after meeting Mme von Graun's friend, Mme Nina Lecerf, and hearing stories of von Graun's unflattering affair with a Russian, V. becomes convinced that Helene von Graun is the woman in question. Nina invites V. to visit her in the country, where Helene von Graun will be staying with her. Finding that Helene has not yet arrived, V. mentions to Nina a letter introducing himself to Mme von Graun, which angers her. By chance, V. learns that it is Nina Lecerf herself, and not Helene, who was Sebastian's final romance. Nina was, in fact, the Mme de Rechnoy whom V. had originally suspected but never met.

The final chapters of the narration deal with The Doubtful Asphodel, Sebastian's final novel, which is centered on a dying man and his slow decay. V.'s description of the novel reveals similarities and coincidence not only with Sebastian's life, but with V.'s own investigative adventures. V. tries to account for Sebastian's final years, including a last letter from Sebastian asking V. to visit him at a hospital outside Paris. As V. makes the trip (from Marseilles, where he is temporarily stationed by his firm), his ties to his own life become increasingly visible for their tenuousness: his employer hampers his ability to travel, he struggles to remember necessary details such as the hospital name, he even lacks sufficient money to travel efficiently. V. finally arrives at the hospital and listens to his sleeping brother's breathing from a separate room, only to discover that the sleeping man is not his brother, but another man. Sebastian Knight had died the night before.

The novel concludes with a philosophical reconciliation of Sebastian's life and a final implication that V. himself is Sebastian Knight, or at least his incarnation.

== Composition ==
The Real Life of Sebastian Knight is a biographical metafiction which is in some ways an anticipation of postmodernism. Although there are elements of the detective story in its description of a quest to ascertain facts about a very private and evasive novelist, its subject cannot be grasped through the medium of language, even though Sebastian Knight is only knowable through his own medium. Instead, the book spins “a texture of words around an empty point, an absence”, according to Giorgio Manganelli. By the end of the second chapter it has become clear, anyway, that the projected book will not be about Knight's life but his brother V's attempt to write it.

What complicates the process of getting to know the real Sebastian Knight is the interlayering of a subjective account of the quest with a variety of texts. There is firstly the hastily written and poorly researched biography by Mr Goodman, Knight's ignominiously dismissed secretary, largely written to fit a simplistic thesis. Then there is Knight's own “memoir”, supported by passages from his novels, both as stylistic demonstrations and illustrative of V's subjective reading of their biographical significance. Finally there are V's own novelistic interpolations, making clear the difference between Knight's linguistic mastery and the literary devices used by hack authors. “Who is speaking of Sebastian Knight?” asks a sudden voice in the Cambridge mist at the end of chapter 5, only to be disavowed immediately. In a similar way, V prepares a speech to unmask the deception of Madame Lecerf at the end of chapter 17 but then refrains. “She will be sent a copy of this book and will understand.”

Such tricks continue the perception in Nabokov's earlier novel Despair that “the first person is as fictitious as all the rest”. It is also open to the reader to play the detective himself, noting in what ways the novel reflects Nabokov's own biography. He too was a Russian émigré who was educated at Cambridge, his relationship with his brother Sergei was always at arm's length, and an unwise emotional entanglement had just endangered his domestic arrangements.

== Books by Sebastian Knight ==
The narrator discusses the following (fictitious) works by Knight:

- The Prismatic Bezel, Sebastian's first novel, "a rollicking parody of the setting of a detective tale"
- Success, Sebastian's second novel, traces "the exact way in which two lines of life were made to come into contact"
- Lost Property, Sebastian's memoir. "A counting of the things and souls lost" on SK's "literary journey of discovery"
- The Funny Mountain, the collective title of a volume of three short stories: "The Funny Mountain", "Albinos in Black", and "The Back of the Moon"
- The Doubtful Asphodel, a final book in which "A man is dying, and he is the hero of the tale . . . The man is the book; the book itself is heaving and dying, and drawing up a ghostly knee".

== Influence ==
It has been suggested that The Real Life of Sebastian Knight was a strong influence on Thomas Pynchon's debut novel V.. V. resembles Nabokov's novel in plot, character, narration and style, and the title alludes directly to Nabokov's narrator "V." in The Real Life of Sebastian Knight.
