= Keith Bullen =

Keith Bullen may refer to:

- Keith Bullen (mathematician) (1906–1976), New Zealand-born mathematician and geophysicist
- Keith Bullen (poet) (died 1946), British poet and teacher
