= Nicholas Moore =

English poet

- Born: 16 November 1918; Cambridge, England
- Died: 26 January 1986 (aged 67); St Mary Cray, Kent, England
- Education: Trinity College, Cambridge
- Occupations: Poet, publisher
- Spouse(s): Priscilla Craig (1940–1948); Shirley Putnam (1953– )
- Children: 2
- Relatives: G. E. Moore (father), Thomas Sturge Moore (uncle), George Herbert Ely (grandfather)
- Writing career
- Pen name: Guy Kelly (1945), Romeo Anschilo (1968)
- Notable awards: Harriet Monroe Memorial Prize, Contemporary Poetry's Patron Prize
- Literary movement: New Apocalyptics

Nicholas Moore (16 November 1918 – 26 January 1986) was an English poet, associated with the New Apocalyptics in the 1940s, whose reputation stood as high as Dylan Thomas’s. He later dropped out of the literary world.

== Biography ==
Moore was born in Cambridge, England, the elder child of the philosopher G. E. Moore and Dorothy Ely. His paternal uncle was the poet, artist and critic Thomas Sturge Moore, his maternal grandfather was OUP editor and author George Herbert Ely and his brother was the composer Timothy Moore (1922–2003).

He was educated at the Dragon School in Oxford, Leighton Park School in Reading, the University of St Andrews, and Trinity College, Cambridge. Moore was editor and co-founder of a literary review, Seven (1938–40), while still an undergraduate. Seven, Magazine of People's Writing, had a complex later history: Moore edited it with John Goodland; it later appeared edited by Gordon Cruikshank, and then by Sydney D. Tremayne, after Randall Swingler bought it in 1941 from Philip O'Connor.

While in Cambridge Moore became closely involved with literary London, in particular Tambimuttu. He published pamphlets under the Poetry London imprint in 1941 (of George Scurfield, G. S. Fraser, Anne Ridler and his own work). This led to Moore becoming Tambimuttu's assistant. Moore later worked for the Grey Walls Press. In the meantime he had registered as a conscientious objector.

The Glass Tower, a selected poems collection from 1944, appeared with illustrations by the young Lucian Freud. In 1945 he edited The PL Book of Modern American Short Stories, and won Contemporary Poetry's Patron Prize (judged that year by W. H. Auden) for Girl with a Wine Glass. In 1947 he won the Harriet Monroe Memorial Prize for Girls and Birds and various other poems.

Later Moore encountered difficulty in publishing; he was in the unusual position for a British poet of having a higher reputation in the United States. His association with the "romantics" of the 1940s was, in fact, rather an inaccurate reflection of his style.

In the 1950s he worked as a horticulturist, writing a book The Tall Bearded Iris (1956). In 1968 he entered 31 separate pseudonymous translations of a single Baudelaire poem, in a competition for the Sunday Times, run by George Steiner. Each translation focused on a different element of the poem: rhyme, pattern, tropes, symbolism, etc. producing vastly different results, to illustrate the inadequacies and lacunae produced in translation. This work was published in 1973 as Spleen; it is also available online.

Longings of the Acrobats, a selected poems volume, was edited by Peter Riley and published in 1990 by Carcanet Press. An interview with Riley concerning Moore's rediscovery and later years appears as a documentary element within the "Guilty River" chapter of Iain Sinclair's novel Downriver. According to Riley, Moore was extremely prolific and left behind many unpublished poems. An example of one of Moore's "pomenvylopes" – idiosyncratic documents consisting of poems and comments typed onto envelopes and posted to friends and acquaintances – appears online at The Fortnightly Review.

His Selected Poems was published by Shoestring Press in 2014.

== Bibliography ==
- A Book for Priscilla (1941)
- A Wish in Season (1941)
- The Island and the Cattle (1941)
- Buzzing Around with a Bee, and Other Poems, etc (1941)
- The Cabaret, the Dancer, the Gentlemen (1942)
- The Glass Tower (1944)
- Thirty-Five Anonymous Odes (published anonymously, 1944)
- The War of the Little Jersey Cows (published under the pseudonym "Guy Kelly", 1945)
- The Anonymous Elegies and other poems (published anonymously, 1945)
- Recollections of the Gala: Selected Poems 1943–48 (1950)
- The Tall Bearded Iris (1956)
- Anxious To Please (1968) (published under the pseudonym (anagram) "Romeo Anschilo", 1995 by Oasis Books)
- Identity (1969)
- Resolution and Identity (1970)
- Spleen (1973)
- Lacrimae Rerum (1988)
- Longings of the Acrobats: Selected Poems (1990)
- Dronkhois Malperhu and Other Poems (1996)
- The Orange Bed (2011)
- Selected Poems (2014)
