= John Bayliss =

John C Bayliss (1919–2008) was a British poet and significant literary editor of the World War II period; later in life, he became a civil servant. He was born in Gloucestershire, and was an undergraduate at St Catharine's College, Cambridge. He served in the RAF during the war.

He edited: The Fortune Anthology (1942) with Nicholas Moore, and Douglas Newton; New Road (1943 and 1944) with Alex Comfort; A Romantic Miscellany (1946) with Derek Stanford. His collection The White Knight and other poems was published in 1944. He contributed in the war years to Poetry London and Poetry Quarterly; later to Poetry Review. He was also published in Air Force Poetry (1944). In 1977 he published "Venus in Libra" in full, some sections of which had been published in "Poetry Quarterly" and "New Road 1944"

He is sometimes associated with the New Apocalyptics, perhaps because of his poem Apocalypse and Resurrection; he is also called a surrealist, or New Romantic.

John Bayliss died on 18 August 2008.
