= Terence Tiller =

English poet and radio producer

Terence Tiller

Terence Rogers Tiller (19 September 1916 – 24 December 1987) was an English poet and radio producer.

== Early life, poet ==
Tiller was born in Truro, Cornwall and educated at Latymer Upper School in Hammersmith. He studied history at Jesus College, Cambridge, where he graduated with a starred first-class BA degree in 1937 and won the Chancellor's Medal for English Verse. He then lectured in medieval history at Cambridge from 1937 to 1939. But then, just before the war, he accepted an academic position in Cairo, where he remained stranded. For the next six years he taught English literature at what was then the King Fuad I University.

While there he became associated with the Personal Landscape group of poets that also included Keith Douglas, Lawrence Durrell, Robin Fedden and Bernard Spencer. His enigmatic poems about wartime Egypt, showing the influence of Wilfred Owen, gained attention through the publication of his Poems in 1941, followed by The Inward Animal in 1943. His most acclaimed poetry collection was Unarm, Eros (1947), containing poems of “strong formal pattern, heraldic imagery, and striking sensuousness”.

== BBC ==
In 1946 he joined the BBC Features Department, where he was responsible for hundreds of plays and feature broadcasts on a wide range of subjects, but mainly on history, literature and mythology. His contemporaries in the department included fellow poets Rayner Heppenstall, Louis MacNeice and W. R. Rodgers. During this period, Tiller became a noted Fitzrovian. He collaborated with the composer Elizabeth Poston on features such as The Shepherds' Play (1947), The Death of Adam (1949), Lilith (1950), and The Holy Child (1952). In 1955 he adapted and produced the first BBC radio series of J. R. R. Tolkien's The Lord of the Rings (which did not please the author). He adapted and modernized Chaucer's The Parlement of Foules in 1958.

In 1964 he moved to the Drama Department. His work on the weekly chess programme on the Third Programme led to his book Chess Treasury of the Air in 1966. In 1969 he completed the posthumous story After Ten Years by C. S. Lewis for broadcast, and in 1973 he brought Mervyn Peake's The Rhyme of the Flying Bomb to the airwaves.

Tiller retired from the BBC in 1976, but continued working on some projects. In 1979 he dramatized Vladimir Nabokov's novel The Defence.

== Bibliography ==
Poetry

- Poems (1941), Hogarth Press)
- The Inward Animal (1943)
- Unarm, Eros (1947),
- Reading a Medal, and other poems (1957)
- Notes for a Myth (1968, Chatto & Windus)
- That Singing Mesh, and other poems (1979)
- Collected Poems (Eyewear Publishing, 2016)

As editor, translator

- The Vision of Piers Plowman; translated from Middle English into Modern English verse
- A translation of Dante
- Chess Treasury of the Air (Penguin Handbooks; PH124; 1966), as editor
- New Poems 1960, edited with Anthony Cronin and Jon Silkin
- John Gower Confessio Amantis: 'The Lover's Shrift'; translated from Middle English into Modern English verse. (Penguin Classic, 1965)
