= C. A. Trypanis =

Greek classical scholar (1909–1993)

Constantine Athanasius Trypanis
- Κωνσταντίνος Αθανάσιος Τρυπάνης
- Born: 22 January 1909; Chios, Greece
- Died: 18 January 1993 (aged 83); Athens, Greece

Academic background
- Education: National and Kapodistrian University of Athens; Friedrich Wilhelm University of Berlin; Ludwig-Maximilians-Universität München

Academic work
- Institutions: National and Kapodistrian University of Athens; Exeter College, Oxford

Constantine Athanasius Trypanis (Greek: Κωνσταντίνος Αθανάσιος Τρυπάνης; 22 January 1909 – 18 January 1993) was a Greek classicist, literary critic, translator and poet.

== Biography ==
Born in Chios, Greece, Trypanis received his education at The Classical Gymnasium, Chios and the National and Kapodistrian University of Athens, the Friedrich Wilhelm University of Berlin, and the Ludwig-Maximilians-Universität München. He received a doctorate from the University of Athens in 1937. From 1939 to 1945, he taught at the University of Athens and, in 1947, moved to Britain where he began teaching at Exeter College, Oxford as the Bywater and Sotheby professor of Byzantine and Modern Greek. It was also in England that Trypanis' met and befriended the poet Ian Fletcher, whom Trypanis afterwards referred to as "the master," with Trypanis himself "as the pupil". In 1968 Trypanis relocated to Chicago, after acting as a visiting professor at various other American universities, where he taught Classical Literature until 1974. In 1974 he returned to his native Greece, serving as Minister for Culture and Sciences until 1977. He remained in Greece until his death. He died in Athens in 1993.

Though his poetry has since fallen into obscurity, his writings received some critical acclaim in his time, with two of his collections, The Stones of Troy and The Cocks of Hades receiving, respectively, the choice of the Poetry Book Society and the Heinemann Award of the Royal Society of Literature. His poetry was also acclaimed by the likes of Theodore Roethke, W. H. Auden and John Wain. His poetry was first published while he was living in England, and it was also while in England that he began to develop a poetic circle of his own; he wrote his poetry (at least that portion which was published) in English, his second language, which perhaps opens the door to comparisons to the likes of Joseph Conrad and Vladimir Nabokov, both of whom wrote in English, despite being native speakers of Polish and Russian, respectively. Much of Trypanis' poetic writings were centered on the artifacts, history and mythology of antiquity, especially that of Classical Greece and Rome, though others of his poems centered on aspects and events of his contemporary world.

== Bibliography ==
=== Poetry collections ===
- Pedasus: Twenty-four Poems (1955) (Limited to 150 copies)
- The Stones of Troy (1957)
- The Cocks of Hades (1958)
- Pompeian Dog (1964)
- Grooves in the Wind (1964) (Reprints selections from The Stones of Troy and The Cocks of Hades, and one new poem)
- The Elegies of a Glass Adonis (1967) (Limited to 450 numbered copies, each signed by Trypanis)
- The Glass Adonis (1972) (Includes the contents of Elegies of a Glass Adonis)

=== Translations ===
- Fourteen Early Byzantine Cantica (1968)
- Callimachus, Aetia, Iambi, lyric poems, Hecale, minor epic and elegiac poems, and other fragments (1975).
- Sophocles, the Three Theban Plays (1986)

=== Criticism ===
- Medieval and Modern Greek Poetry (Oxford: Clarendon Press, 1951)
- Romanus, Sancti Romani Melodi Cantica. I: Cantica genuina (1963) (Editor, in collaboration with Paul Maas)
- Romanus, Sancti Romani Melodi Cantica. II: Cantica dubia (1970) (Editor, in collaboration with Paul Maas)
- The Penguin Book of Greek Verse (1971) (Editor)
- The Homeric Epics (1977)
- Greek Poetry, from Homer to Seferis (1981)
