= Tilly-sur-Seulles War Cemetery =

Second World War British military cemetery in France

- Commonwealth War Graves Commission
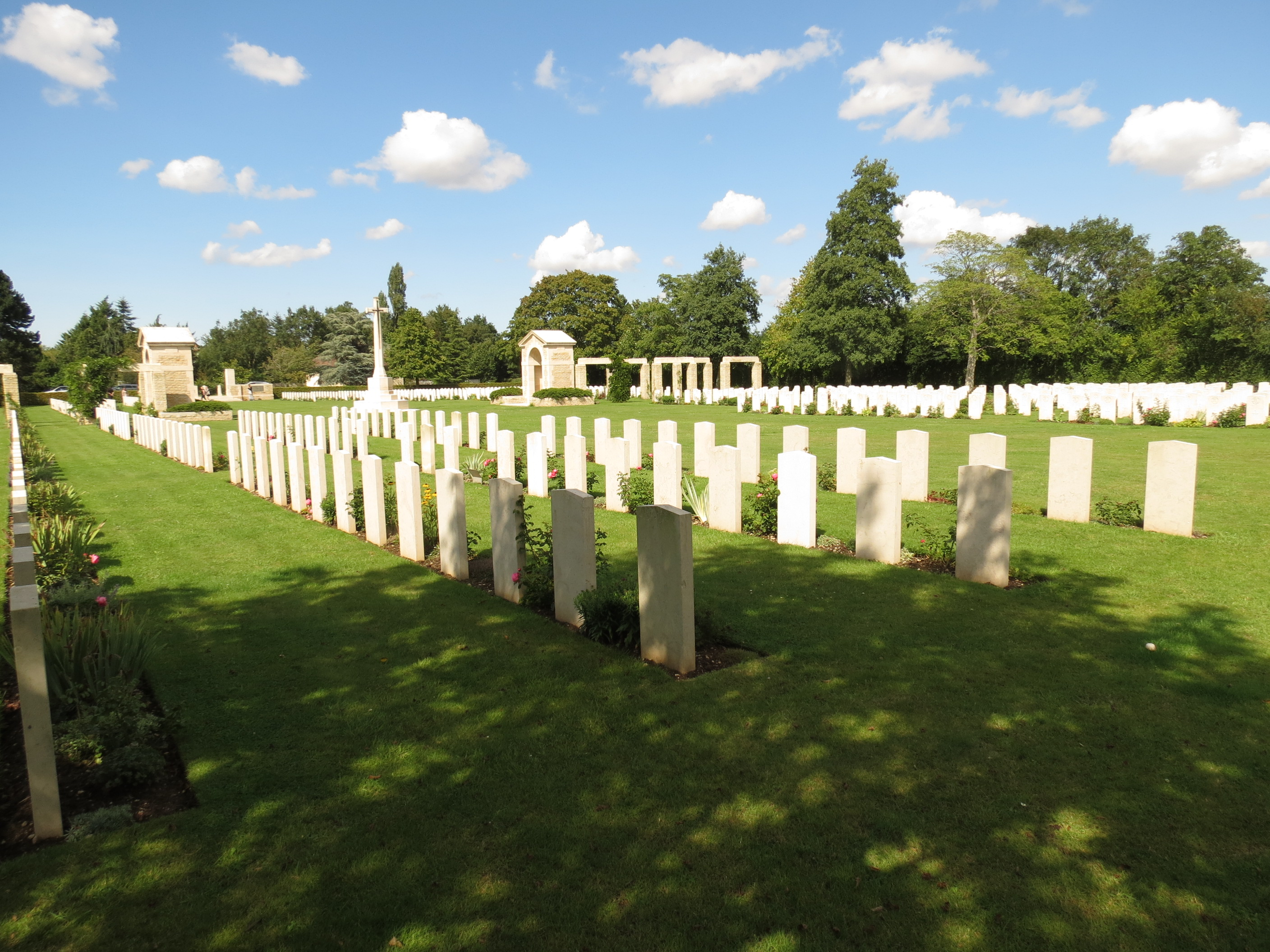
- Graves in the cemetery
- Used for those deceased 1944
- Established: 1944
- Location: 49.1755°N 0.6260°W near Saint-Charles-de-Percy War Cemetery, Normandy, France
- Designed by: Philip D. Hepworth
- Total burials: 1222
- Unknowns: 45

Burials by nation
- British 986; New Zealanders 2 Australian 1 Canadian 1 German 232

Burials by war
- World War II

Tilly-sur-Seulles War Cemetery is a British Second World War cemetery of Commonwealth soldiers located in the village of Tilly-sur-Seulles, some 13 km (8.1 mi) south of Bayeux in Normandy. The cemetery contains 990 Commonwealth burials and 232 German graves.

== History ==
The majority of the soldiers interred in the cemetery were killed during the breakout battles (such as Operation Bluecoat) fought by the Allies in July and August 1944. Casualties are from the 7th Armoured Division, 49th (West Riding) Infantry Division and 50th (Northumbrian) Infantry Division as well as a number of Irish Guards officers and servicemen from the Royal Norfolk Regiment. Tilly-sur-Seulles was finally liberated on 18 June 1944 and the first interment in the cemetery was on 8 July 1944. A number of casualties previously in field graves were re-interred in the cemetery.

== Notable burials ==
- Keith Douglas, war poet, killed 9 June 1944

== Location ==
The cemetery is 13 km (8.1 mi) south of Bayeux on the road to Villers-Bocage, on the D.13.

== See also ==
- List of military cemeteries in Normandy
