= Ian Fletcher (literary critic) =

British academic (1920–1988)

Ian Fletcher (1920–1988) was an English poet, scholar and literary critic, specializing in Victorian literature. He edited definitive editions of the works of John Gray and Lionel Johnson, as well as publishing studies on such seminal fin-de-siècle figures as Aubrey Beardsley and Walter Pater. He spent the last six years of his life teaching at Arizona State University. His collected poems were published in 1998, ten years after his death.

== Biography ==
Fletcher was born in a Streatham nursing home in 1920, the only child of John Archibald Fletcher (c.1887–1968), a farmer and retired army major, and Katherine Margaret Richardson (1888–1979). His parents separated before he was born. He grew up in Catford and Shepherd's Bush, and lived with his mother, a woman of forceful character. His family had strong Scottish antecedents and for a while as a young man he spelled his name Iain as a gesture to Scottish nationalism.

He was educated at Dulwich College. Money was short, and he left school at the age of 15 in order to earn a living. He worked as a librarian in Lewisham Public Library, and at the same time set out to write poetry and read widely. He haunted second-hand bookshops, and collected a library of works by lesser-known and neglected writers of the 1890s. In 1939 he made friends with John Gawsworth, another bibliophile and enthusiast for neglected writers.

Fletcher began to study for an external London University degree, but the war intervened and he joined the army. He served in the Middle East, and latterly in Cairo, from 1941 to 1946. Cairo was something of a literary centre at this time and Fletcher came into contact with numerous other poets, including Bernard Spencer, G S Fraser and Ruth Speirs. Fletcher always retained an interest in making sure that the work of Second World War poets was not underestimated or forgotten, supporting the Salamander Oasis Trust in their production of anthologies and putting on an exhibition, based on his donated collection, in Reading University Library in 1981.

Back in London after the war, Fletcher returned to librarianship and took an active part in the London literary scene. He helped to edit two short-lived literary magazines, Colonnade and Nine, and published his first book of poetry in 1947. He continued to research the last part of the nineteenth century and in 1953 wrote a book on Lionel Johnson. This was brought to the attention of Professor Donald J. Gordon of Reading University who offered Fletcher a lecturership on the strength of it in spite of his lack of a degree.

Fletcher had a distinguished career at Reading, gaining a PhD, his only degree, with a thesis on the history of the little magazine in 1965, and progressing to a professorship in 1978. He was a generous benefactor of the library and its fledgling archive. He married Loraine in 1965, and captained an amateur cricket team.

Fletcher frequently lectured in America. In 1982, after taking early retirement from Reading, he took up a post at Arizona State University. His last years were clouded by ill-health although he remained mentally alert to the end, dying in hospital in Birmingham in 1988.

He left a wife and two daughters.

== Reception ==
The scholar John Stokes wrote that Fletcher already had his own style while taking his PhD, and that he and his supervisor, Donald Gordon, shared a belief in W. B. Yeats's greatness, and that "strange beliefs do not have to be believed to be thought interesting, or to be an essential tool for the understanding of great works of literature". They collaborated on a "pioneering" book on Yeats.

== Books ==
=== By Fletcher ===
- 1953: The Complete Poems of Lionel Johnson (edited) (Unicorn Press)
- 1961: W.B. Yeats: Images of a Poet, with D. J. Gordon (Manchester University Press)
- 1967: Romantic Mythologies (Routledge)
- 1971: Walter Pater (British Council/Longmans)
- 1971: Meredith Now: Some Critical Essays (Routledge)
- 1979: Decadence and the 1890s (Holmes & Meier)
- 1981: A Catalogue of the Imagist Poets, with Wallace Martin (AMS Press)
- 1987: Aubrey Beardsley (Twayne)
- 1987: British Poetry and Prose 1870-1905, The Oxford Authors series (edited) (Oxford University Press)
- 1990: Rediscovering Herbert Horne: Poet, Architect, Typographer, Art Historian (ELT Press)

=== About Fletcher ===
- 1990: Essays & Poems: in memory of Ian Fletcher, 1920-1988 (University of North Carolina)
- 2009: Ian Fletcher: Poet and Scholar (Shoestring Press)
