= Robin Fedden =

British writer, diplomat and mountaineer (1908–1977)

Henry Robin Romilly Fedden, CBE (26 November 1908 – 20 March 1977) was an English writer, diplomat and mountaineer. He was the son of artist Romilly Fedden and novelist Katherine Waldo Douglas.

== Life ==
Born in Oxfordshire, England and raised mostly in Chantemesle, Seine-et-Oise, France, Fedden attended Clifton College and Magdalene College, Cambridge, at the same time as the actor Michael Redgrave. During their undergraduate years he and Redgrave, alongside the art historian Anthony Blunt, edited an avant-garde literary magazine called The Venture, which published work by Louis MacNeice, Julian Bell and John Lehmann. Upon going down from Cambridge, Fedden served as a diplomat in Athens and taught English literature at Cairo University. He was one of the Cairo poets, and co-edited the literary journal Personal Landscape with Lawrence Durrell and Bernard Spencer. After World War II, he worked for the National Trust, rising to the post of Deputy Director-General. He retired in 1973. Fedden was married to Renée (née Catzeflis); they had two daughters. He died in 1977.

== Legacy as a writer ==
Fedden had a wide variety of interests, which were reflected in his books. The best known of these are The Enchanted Mountains and Chantemesle. He also wrote several guidebooks for the National Trust. He was a dedicated mountaineer, a pursuit he took up in his late thirties. Henry Miller disliked Fedden. He recalled their meetings in Athens when he later wrote bitterly of expatriate Englishmen in The Colossus of Maroussi. Miller "hated [Fedden's] stammer and his effete way of talking and ... framed a sharply satirical portrait of him in the Colossus," wrote Lawrence Durrell in a letter in 1977. But Durrell recognised that 'behind the slight stoop and stutter that were part of Fedden's disarming charm, there was a sharply critical mind interrogating the cultures of Europe and the East, and [Durrell] looked up to him as he did to none of his other contemporaries' during the war years.

== Selected works ==
- The Enchanted Mountains: a Quest in the Pyrenees
- Alpine Ski Tour 1956
- Chantemesle (1964; reissued by Eland Books in 2002)
- The National Trust Guide (with Rosemary Joekes)
- Treasures of the National Trust
- The Continuing Purpose: History of the National Trust, Its Aims and Work
- The National Trust: Past and Present
- Churchill and Chartwell
- The Land of Egypt
- Crusader Castles
- The Country House Guide
- Suicide: A Social and Historical Study
- Syria and Lebanon
- Syria: An historical appreciation
- English Travellers in the Near East
- Anglesey Abbey
- Petworth House
- Egypt: Land of the Valley
