= Robert Liddell =

British writer (1908–1992)

(John) Robert Liddell (13 October 1908 – 23 July 1992) was an English literary critic, biographer, novelist, travel writer and poet.

== Life ==
Liddell was born in Tunbridge Wells, England, the elder of two sons of Major John Stewart Liddell, CMG, DSO, who served with the Royal Engineers and later worked for the Egyptian Government at Cairo, and his first wife, Anna Gertrude, daughter of E. Morgan, of Hongershall Park, Tunbridge Wells. He was a great-grandson of Sir John Liddell, KCB, Director-General of the Medical Department of the Royal Navy, and his paternal grandmother was of the gentry family of Gibson of Shalford and Sullington. Liddell's mother died in 1914; his father remarried in 1916, to Theresa, daughter of Paul Rottenburg, LL.D, of Glasgow. Poor relations developed between the two boys and their stepmother, who was the basis for the central character in Liddell's novel Stepsons.

Liddell was educated at Ashdown House, East Sussex, at Haileybury School and at Corpus Christi College, Oxford. During the years 1933 to 1938 he was employed at the Bodleian Library as an assistant in the Department of Western Manuscripts. Liddell then lived briefly in Athens, Greece, working as a lecturer for the British Council. During the years 1941 to 1951 he was a lecturer at the universities of Cairo and Alexandria. From 1953 to 1972 he was employed by the University of Athens, serving for part of the time as head of the English Department. He never returned to England, and died in Athens in 1992.

While in Oxford he began a lifelong friendship with the novelist Barbara Pym. The character of Dr. Nicholas Parnell in Pym's novel Some Tame Gazelle was inspired by Liddell. During World War II he was one of the Cairo poets.

== Works ==
- The Almond Tree (1938)
- Kind Relations (1939)
- The Gantillons (1940)
- Watering-place (1945)
- A Treatise on the Novel (1947)
- The Last Enchantments (1948)
- Unreal City (1952)
- Some Principles of Fiction (1953)
- Aegean Greece (1954)
- The Novels of I. Compton-Burnett (1955)
- Byzantium and Istanbul (1956)
- The Morea (1958)
- The Rivers of Babylon (1959)
- Old and New Athens by Demetrios Sicilianos (1960, as translator)
- The Novels of Jane Austen (1963)
- Mainland Greece (1965)
- An Object for a Walk (1966)
- The Deep End (1968)
- Stepsons (1969, novel)
- Cavafy (1974, biography)
- The Novels of George Eliot (1977)
- Elizabeth and Ivy (1986)
- The Aunts (1987)
- The Abbe Tigrane by Ferdinand Fabre (1988, as translator)
- A Mind at Ease: Barbara Pym and her novels (1989)
- Twin Spirits: The novels of Emily and Anne Brontë (1990)
- Kind Relations (1994)
