= John Gray (poet) =

English poet (1866–1934)

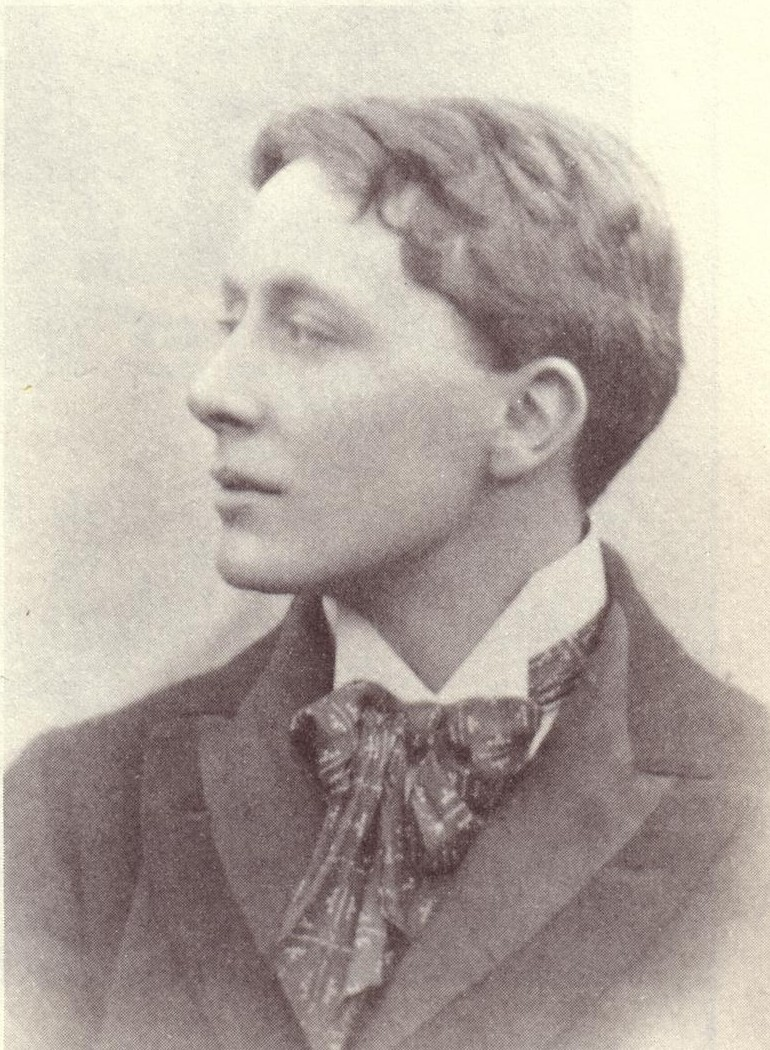
John Gray (1866–1934), poet and priest

Very Reverend Canon John Gray (2 March 1866 – 14 June 1934) was an English poet and Catholic priest whose works include Silverpoints, The Long Road and Park: A Fantastic Story. It has often been suggested that he was the inspiration behind Oscar Wilde's fictional Dorian Gray despite evidence to the contrary. His great nephew is the alternative rock musician Crispin Gray.

== Early life ==
Born in the working-class district of Bethnal Green, London, he was the first of nine children. He left school at the age of 13 and began work as an apprentice metal-worker at the Royal Arsenal. He continued his education by attending a series of evening classes, studying French, German, Latin, music and art. In 1882 he passed the Civil Service exams and, five years later, the University of London matriculation exams. He joined the Foreign Office where he became a librarian.

== Aesthetic movement ==
Gray is best known today as an aesthetic poet of the 1890s and as a friend of Ernest Dowson, Aubrey Beardsley and Oscar Wilde. He was also a talented translator, bringing works by the French Symbolists Stéphane Mallarmé, Paul Verlaine, Jules Laforgue and Arthur Rimbaud into English, often for the first time. He is purported to be the inspiration behind the title character in Wilde's The Picture of Dorian Gray, but distanced himself from this rumour. In fact, Wilde's story was serialised in Lippincott's Monthly Magazine a year before their relationship began (though allegedly Wilde officially denied any earlier association at Gray's request). His relationship with Wilde was initially intense, but had cooled for over two years by the time of Wilde's imprisonment. The relationship appears to have been at its height in the period 1891–1893.

== Literary output ==
Gray's first notable publication was a collection of verse called Silverpoints (1893), consisting of sixteen original poems and thirteen translations from Verlaine (7), Mallarmé (1), Rimbaud (2), and Baudelaire (3). In his review of it Richard Le Gallienne distinguished it from the output of many of the 'decadent' poets in its inability to accomplish "that gloating abstraction from the larger life of humanity that marks the decadent". Gray's second volume, Spiritual Poems, chiefly done out of several languages (1896), defined his developing identity as a Catholic aesthete. It contained eleven original poems and twenty-nine translations from Jacopone da Todi, Prudentius, Verlaine, Angelus Silesius, Notker Balbulus, St John of the Cross, and other poets both Catholic and Protestant. Gray's later works were mainly devotional and often dealt with various Christian saints.

The Long Road (1926) contained his best-known poem, "The Flying Fish", an allegory which had first appeared in The Dial in 1896. Gray produced one novel, Park: A Fantastic Story (1932), a surreal futuristic allegory about Fr Mungo Park, a priest who, in a dream, wakes up in a Britain which has become a post-industrial paradise inhabited by black people who are all Catholics, with the degenerate descendants of the white population living below ground like rats. The novel is characterised by a vein of dry humour, as when a Dominican prior wonders if Park could have met Aquinas.

Gray's collected poems, with extensive notes, were printed in a 1988 volume edited by English professor and 1890s expert Ian Fletcher. His definitive biography was published in 1991 by Jerusha Hull McCormack, who also edited a selection of his prose works. McCormack published a fictionalized version of his life in 2000, under the title of The Man Who Was Dorian Gray. The Picture of John Gray by C.J. Wilmann, a play based on John Gray's life, premiered at The Old Red Lion Theatre, London, in August 2014.

The critic Valentine Cunningham has described Gray as the "stereotypical poet of the nineties".

== Catholicism and personal life ==
Like many of the artists of that period, Gray was a convert to Roman Catholicism. He was baptised on 14 February 1890, but soon lapsed. Wilde's trial appears to have prompted some intense soul-searching in Gray and he re-embraced Catholicism in 1895. In 1896 he gave this reversion poetic form in his volume Spiritual Poems: chiefly done out of several languages. He left his position at the Foreign Office and on 28 November 1898, at the age of 32, he entered the Scots College, Rome, to study for the priesthood. He was ordained by Cardinal Pietro Respighi at St John Lateran on 21 December 1901. He served as a priest in Edinburgh, first at Saint Patrick's Cowgate and then as founding parish priest at Saint Peter's Morningside.

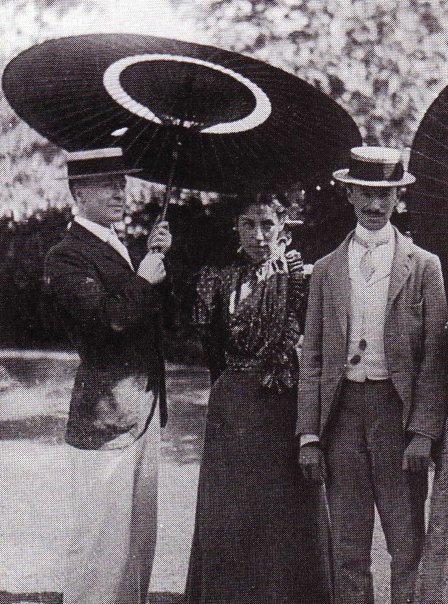
John Gray and Marc-Andre Raffalovich with Gray's sister Sophie, 1896

His most important supporter, and romantic partner, was Marc-André Raffalovich, a wealthy poet and early defender of homosexuality. Raffalovich himself became a Catholic in 1896 and joined the tertiary order of Dominicans. When Gray went to Edinburgh he settled nearby. He helped finance St Peter's Church in Morningside where Gray would serve as priest for the rest of his life. The two remained together until Raffalovich's sudden death in 1934. A devastated Gray died exactly four months later at St. Raphael's nursing home in Edinburgh after a short illness.

== Selected publications ==
- Silverpoints (1893). Poems
- The Blue Calendar (1895–1897). Poems
- Spiritual Poems, chiefly done out of several languages (1896)
- Ad Matrem: Fourteen Scenes in the Life of the Blessed Virgin Mary (1903). Poems
- Vivis (1922). Poems
- The Long Road (1926). Poems
- Poems (1931)
- Park: A Fantastic Story (1932). Manchester: Carcanet, 1985. ISBN 0-85635-538-0
- The Poems of John Gray (edited by Ian Fletcher). Greensboro, North Carolina: ELT Press, 1988. ISBN 0-944318-00-2
- The Selected Prose of John Gray (edited by Jerusha Hull McCormack). Greenboro, North Carolina: ELT Press, 1992. ISBN 0-944318-06-1
