= Sud Express =

Overnight passenger train between Portugal and France

Overview
- Service type: Inter-city rail
- Status: Suspended
- First service: 21 October 1887
- Last service: 16 March 2020
- Former operator: Comboios de Portugal

Route
- Distance travelled: 1,066 km
- Average journey time: 12 hours, 11 minutes
- Service frequency: Daily

On-board services
- Catering facilities: Cafe-bar

Technical
- Track gauge: 1,668 mm (5 ft 5 21/32 in)
- Track owners: Adif; Infraestruturas de Portugal

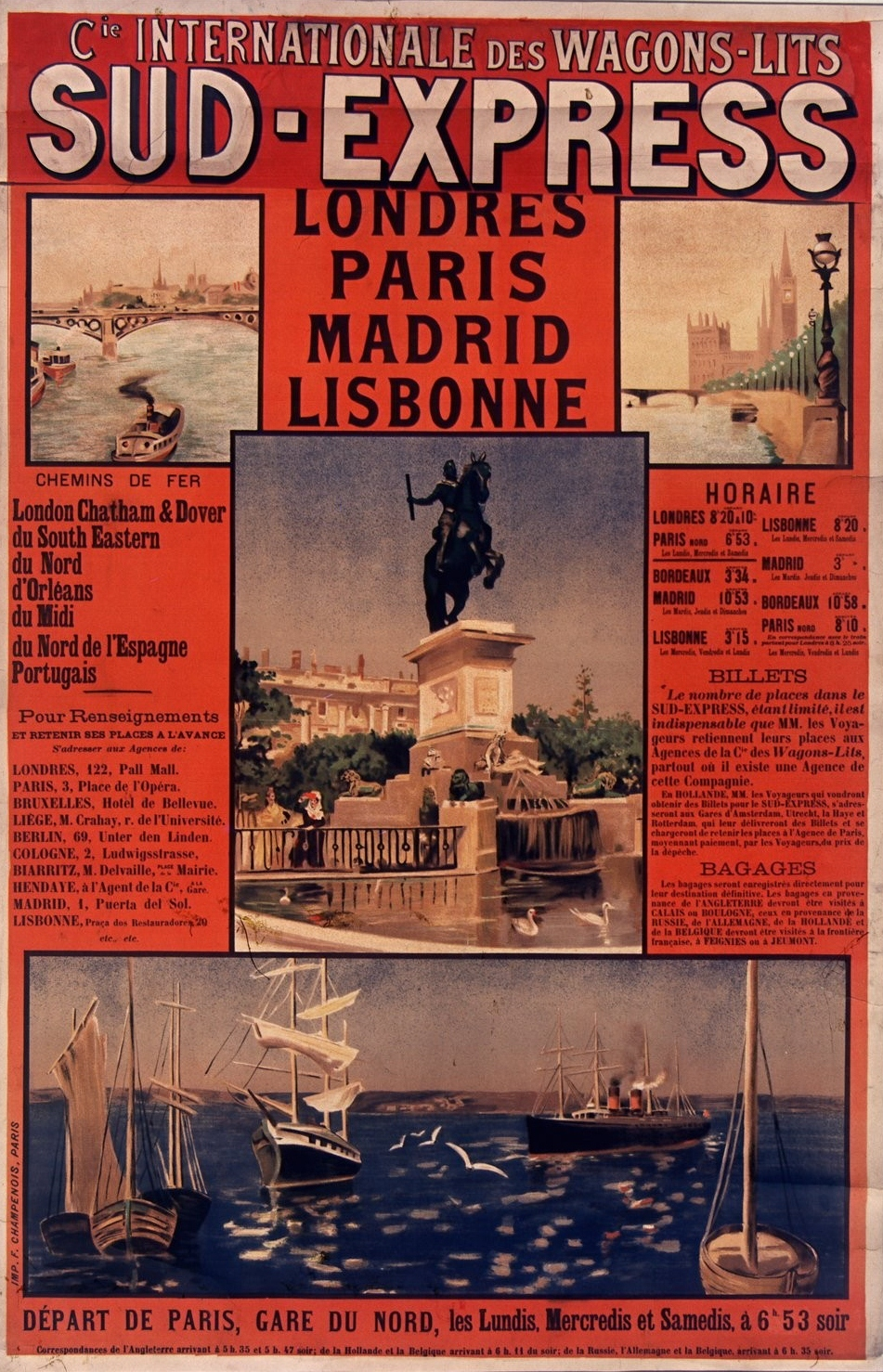

The Sud Express (also called Surexpreso Spanish: [suɾeɣsˈpɾeso] and Sud Expresso Portuguese: [suðɨʃˈpɾesu]) was an overnight passenger train connecting Paris with Lisbon and Madrid, and which originally was operated by the Compagnie Internationale des Wagons-Lits and ran north of Paris to Calais. After 1994, the Sud Express connected Lisboa with Hendaye, a French commune on the Franco-Spanish border. In 1957, Reuters called it "one of Europe's fastest and most famous trains".

For most of the train's history, it was operated in two sections, with passengers needing to change between trainsets at the French–Spanish border because a break of gauge there prevented through operation, but from June 1973 to May 1994 the Sud Express carried through couchette cars between Paris and Lisbon (the Madrid section having been dropped in 1973), thanks to the introduction of cars with bogies (wheelsets) that could be adjusted at the border for the change of gauge. Passengers in sitting cars still had to change trains at the border.

The Sud Express carried Pullman (luxury class) cars exclusively until 1933, when first-class cars were added. It ran without any stops on its Paris–Bordeaux section, which in 1964 was the world's longest non-stop train journey, covering 579.0 km (359.8 mi).

The service was suspended in March 2020 due to the outbreak of the COVID-19 pandemic, but is set to return eventually in the near future.

== History ==
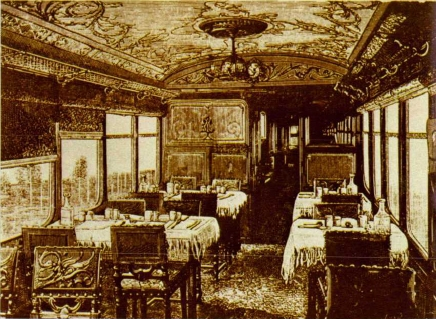
The dining car of the Sud Express in 1887

The inaugural trip of the Sud Express took place on 21 October 1887 connecting Lisbon via Madrid to Paris in 45 hours and services were extended on 4 November 1887 to Calais. By 1900, the cars to and from Lisbon were uncoupled from the Paris–Madrid cars at Medina del Campo, no longer going via Madrid and thereby shortening the journey time between Paris and Lisbon.

For most of the train's history (until 1973), all passengers had to change trains at the French–Spanish border because the two countries used different track gauges, and the break of gauge made it impossible for trains to run through between the two countries.

Initially, the service was weekly, but in 1888 was run twice weekly and from London Charing Cross. Also in 1888, the British Royal Mail launched connecting package services from Lisbon to Rio de la Plata and Brazil. The service frequency increased further and on 1 January 1907 started to run daily.

In the 1930s, the Spanish Civil War caused the service to be suspended more than once, including from the war's outbreak (in 1936) until 5 November 1937 and again from 11 December 1937 to 1 August 1939. It was again suspended on 1 November 1940 due to World War II. It restarted between Paris and Lisbon in March 1945 and soon also again to Madrid.

The train carried only Pullman cars (luxury-class lounge cars and sleeping cars) until 1933, when first-class cars – a lower class than Pullman – were added. By at least 1949, the French portion of the train was also carrying some cars with second-class and third-class compartments, along with first-class and Pullman-class cars. And by 1954, third class had been discontinued but the Sud Express was carrying some cars with second-class compartments on the Spanish and Portuguese portion also, with Pullman-class cars still in use only on the French portion. In 1957, Reuters called it "one of Europe's fastest and most famous trains". By that time, its average speed between Paris and Hendaye had been increased to 105 km/h (65 mph).

Starting in 1953, the Sud Express operated non-stop between Paris and Bordeaux, which in 1964 (at least) was the longest non-stop train journey in the world, covering a distance of 579.0 km (359.8 mi). Its scheduled average speed in 1964 was 121.0 kilometres per hour (75.2 mph), which at the time was only 15.6 km/h (9.7 mph) slower than the fastest train in all of Europe. The train's typical consist was long, with up to 17 cars.

By 1973, the Sud Express's Madrid section had been discontinued, following the June 1969 introduction of a new train, Puerta del Sol, providing through overnight sleeping-car service between Paris and Madrid.

However, in 1973, the Sud Express became able to carry through cars over its entire route, now only Paris–Lisbon, thanks to the introduction of couchette cars fitted with variable-gauge wheelsets. Cooks Continental Timetable explained that, "At Hendaye, the through couchettes Paris–Lisbon and v.v. are jacked up to change the bogies on account of the difference in track gauge between France and Spain." Sitting cars and full sleeping cars continued to run in two separate sections, with passengers having to change at Hendaye or Irun. Through couchette cars running between Paris and Porto were added in summer 1974, followed in June 1975 by Paris–Ourense, the latter being extended to Vigo in 1977.

== Events ==
A 1939 crash near Tolosa, Spain on 29 March killed, amongst others, the artist Romilly Fedden and his novelist wife Katharine Waldo Douglas.

On 11 September 1985, a Sud Express train collided head-on with another train near Moimenta-Alcafache station. The locomotives exploded and the train, carrying about 400 passengers, immediately caught fire. Forty-nine deaths were officially confirmed, most caused by the fire, although unofficial estimates put the number of deaths between 100 and 150. A memorial was erected on site.

== Late 20th century to 2020 ==
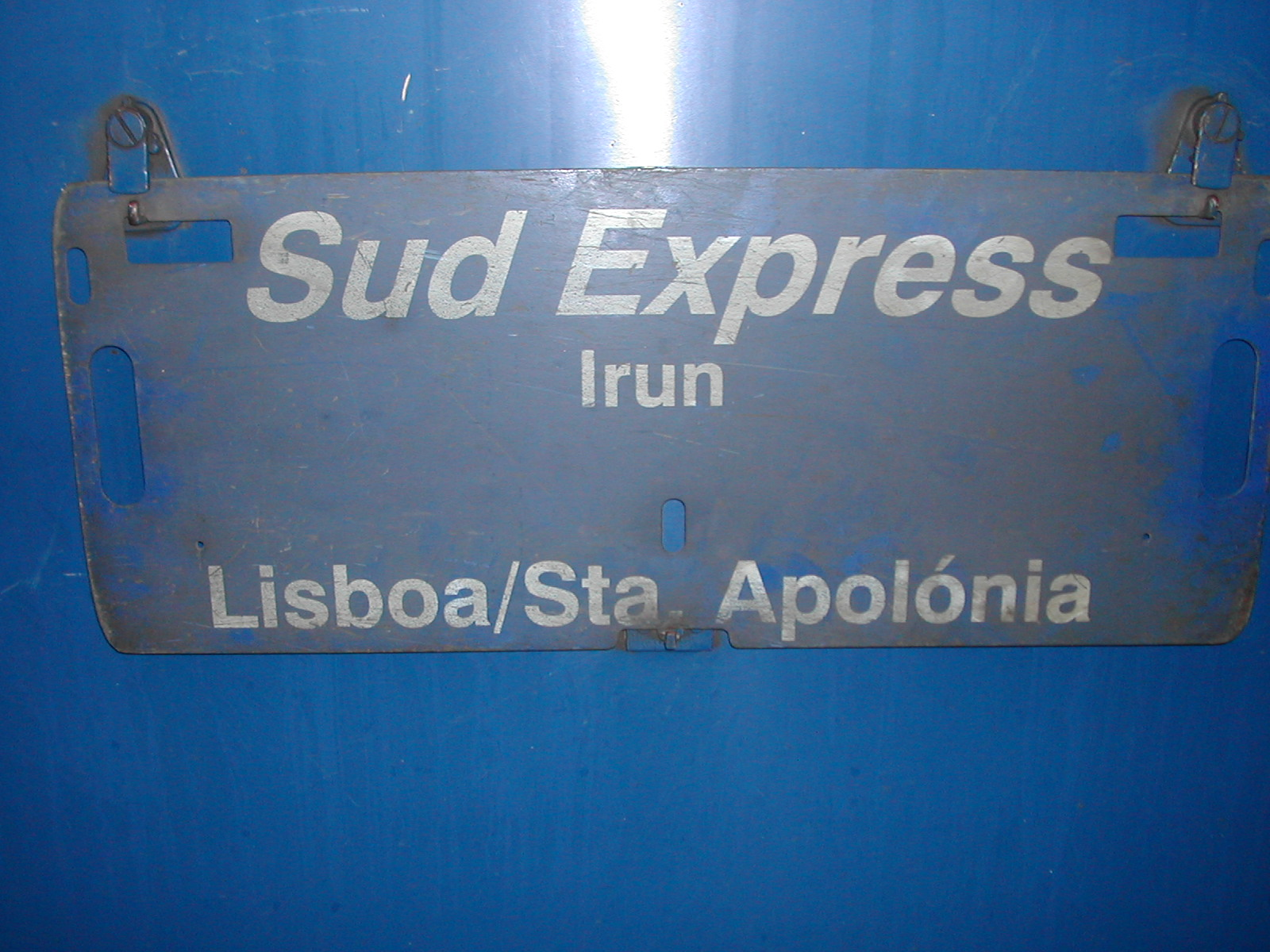
The carriage-side nameboard of the Sud Express in 2008

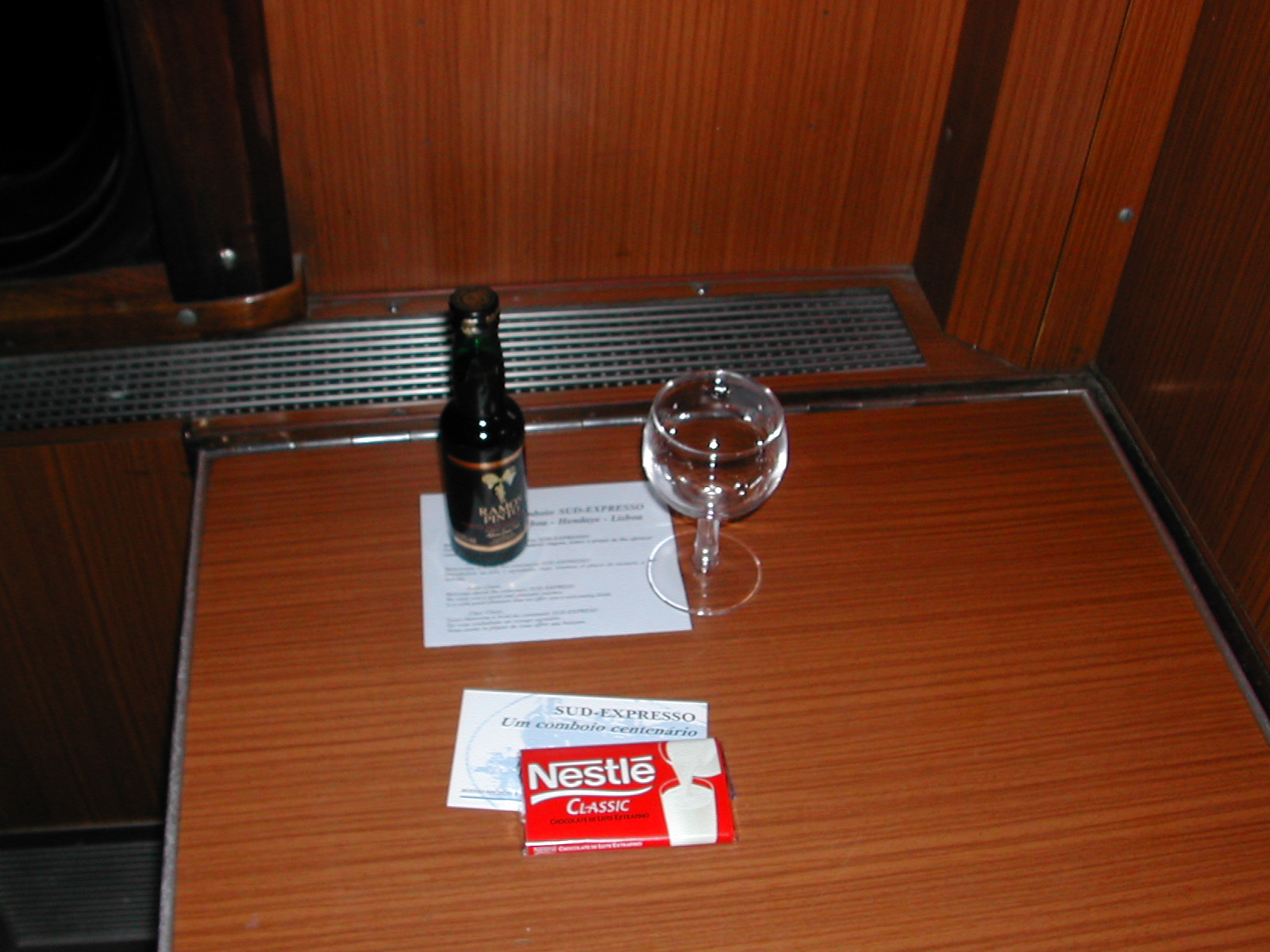
The complimentary gifts which greeted first-class passengers in their sleeping compartments on the Sud Express (2008)

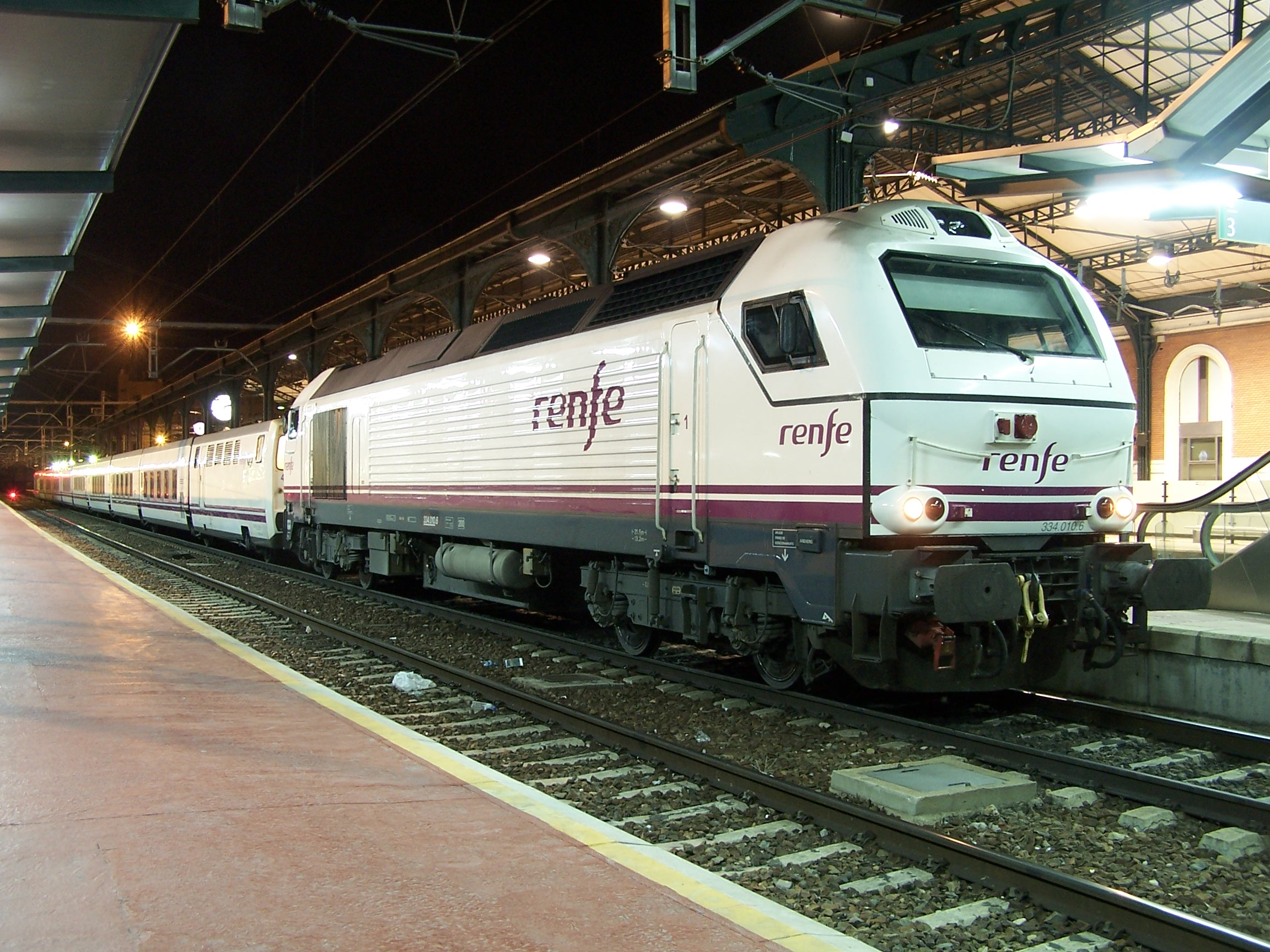
'Racing snail' locomotive with Sud Express

With the 1994 introduction of LGV Atlantique service from Paris to Irún and from Hendaye (the twin border towns on opposite sides of the French/Spanish border), the through Sud Express service was discontinued in favour of a (faster) combination of two different trains. The original connection from and to Paris was then made with one TGV to Irun and from Hendaye.

The continuing Sud Express ran as a night train from Irun at the French/Spanish border to Lisbon and from Lisbon to Hendaye. Until April 2010, facilities existed for second-class seated accommodation, second-class couchette cars (6-bunk compartments), and first-class private sleeping compartments for 1, 2 or 3 passengers.

Previously, first-class passengers found a bar of chocolate and a small bottle of port in their compartments upon boarding the train, with dinner served in a well-appointed dining and bar car, and a continental breakfast the following morning. However, by 2019 the full restaurant car and catering had been replaced by a cafe-bar car.

The train consisted of a Talgo IV set hired from Renfe hauled by a RENFE Class 252 between the Irún/Hendaye and Medina del Campo, a RENFE Class 334 between Medina del Campo and Vilar Formoso and a CP Class 5600 between Vilar Formoso and Lisbon.

The Portuguese government's strategic plan for transport, published in October 2011, envisaged the withdrawal of the Sud Express. In October 2012, CP started an Intercity (later downgraded to InterRegional) service between Porto and Coimbra in order to improve the connection between the Sud Express and northern Portugal. Also from October 2012, this train was operated by CP-Comboios de Portugal.

After 25 April 2018, the southbound Sud Express started at Hendaye (instead of Irún), due to the lack of proper certification from the new fleet of TGV 2N2 operating on the LGV SEA.

== Suspension due to COVID-19 pandemic ==
The service was suspended on 17 March 2020, due to the COVID-19 pandemic, but has not resumed. In March 2021, a representative of the Spanish transport ministry said that the country may stop having night trains even after the end of the coronavirus pandemic.

== Return to service in 2025 ==
In November 2024, a proposal by the LIVRE Party to resume the Sud Express service between Portugal and Spain was approved. As of late 2024, the Portuguese and Spanish governments were negotiating its return to service in the first half of 2025.

== See also ==
- Lists of named passenger trains
- Nord Express
