= Nord Express =

Train line connecting Europe with North Asia

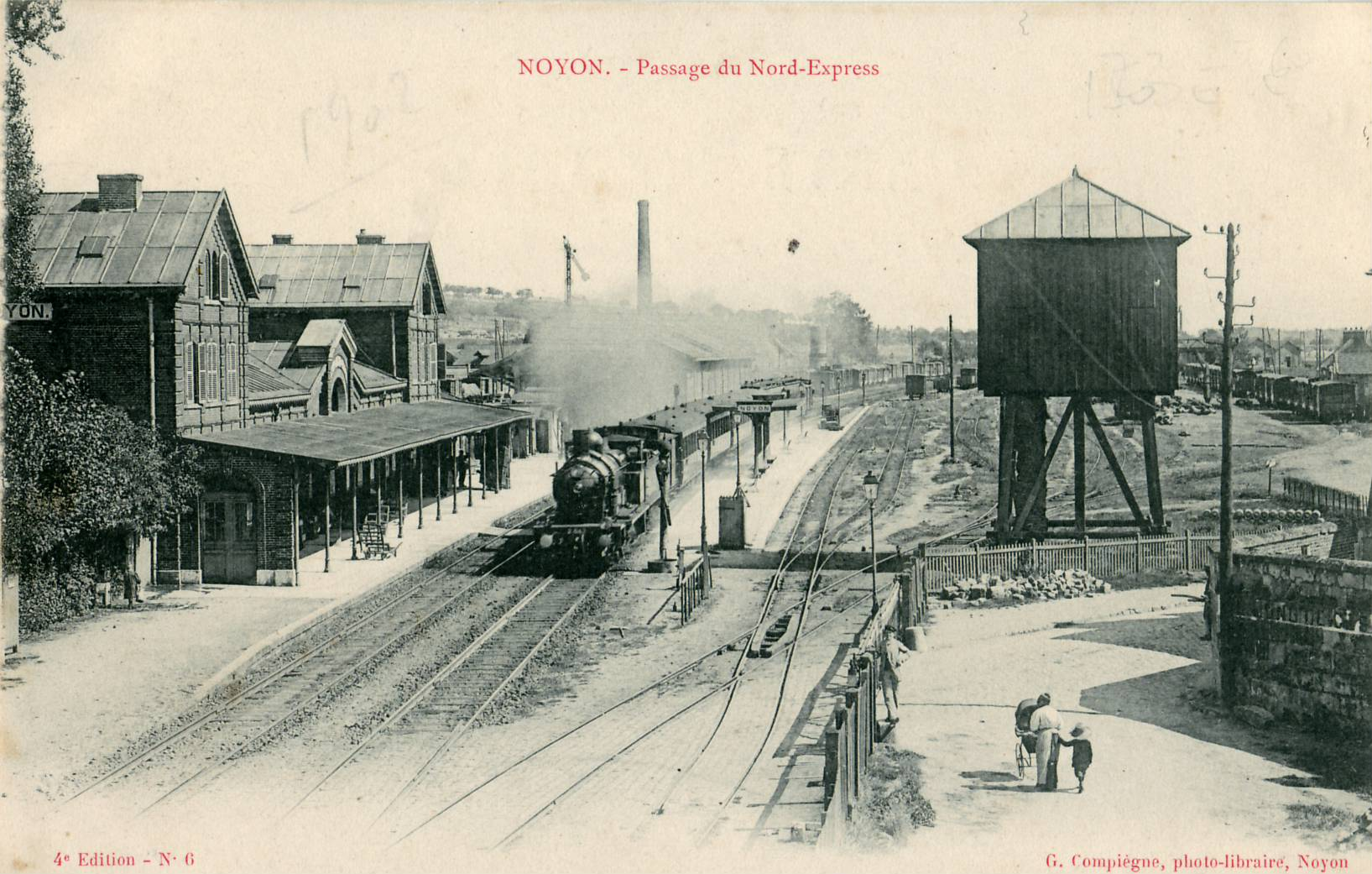
The Nord Express passing the French station of Noyon at the beginning of the 20th century.

The Nord Express (Northern Express) was a long-distance international express train which for more than a century connected Paris with first Russia and later Poland, the Baltic states and Scandinavia. In its heyday before the First World War, it was considered the ultimate luxury train in Europe.

Introduced in 1896 by the Compagnie Internationale des Wagons-Lits, which operated sleeping-cars, dining cars and trains deluxe all over Europe, including the Orient Express, it connected Paris and Saint Petersburg. After World War I and the Russian Revolution, the train's route was shortened to Warsaw and Riga instead of Saint Petersburg. And after World War II the "Iron Curtain" diverted the train's route further to Stockholm and Oslo, until air travel caused the end to this famous train.

Although the Nord Express has received significantly less attention than the Orient Express, it is one of the CIWL's best-known luxury trains and has been featured in a number of artistic works.

== History ==
=== Background ===
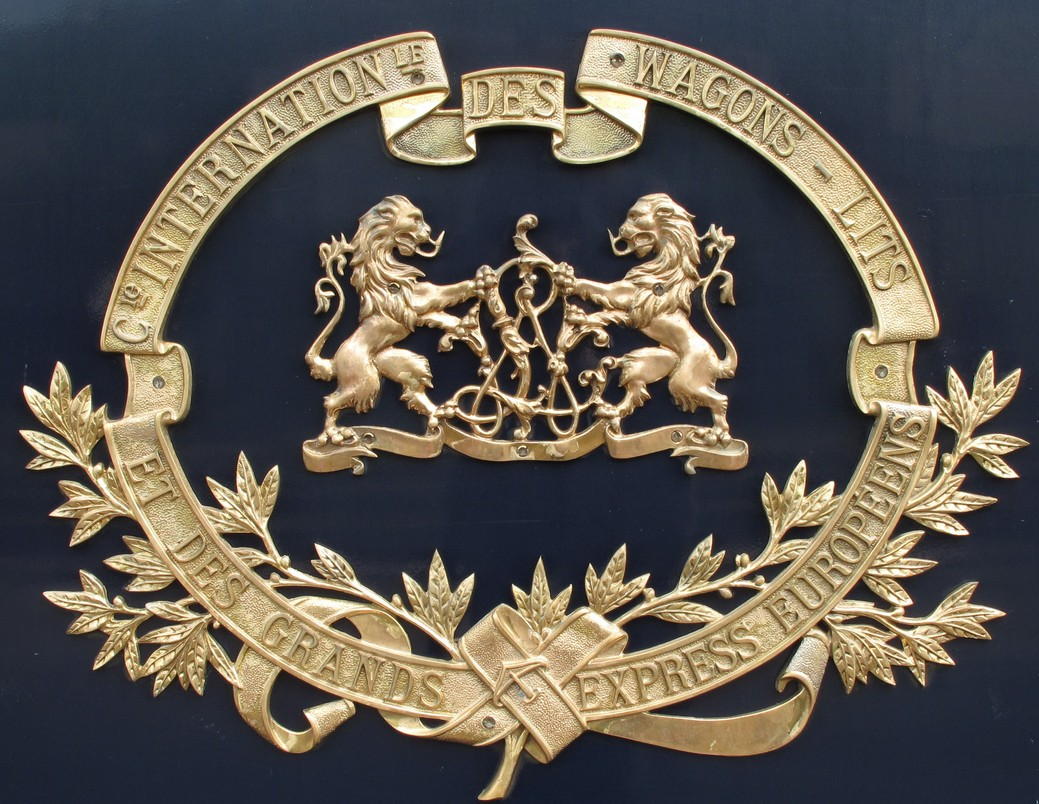
Logo of the CIWL.

In 1874, the Belgian civil engineer and railway entrepreneur Georges Nagelmackers founded the Compagnie Internationale des Wagons-Lits (lit. International Sleeping-Car Company, also CIWL). The purpose was to establish a network of luxurious long-distance passenger trains across the European continent inspired by the Pullman night trains of the United States. As one of these train connections, the CIWL wanted to establish a direct cross-continental link between Saint Petersburg and Lisbon to connect with ocean liners to America. But this concept proved too complex and could not be realized. In turn, two separate connections arose: the Sud Express from Paris to Lisbon and the Nord Express from Paris to Saint Petersburg.

=== Before World War I ===
Route of Nord Express before WW1. Connections to London, Sud Express and Transsiberian Express are in black.

On 9 May 1896, the Nord Express departed for the first time from the French to the Russian capital. This train service enabled people to travel across Europe in what was, by the standards of the time, a very fast and comfortable manner. For the operation of the Nord Express, the CIWL had to close contracts and timetable agreements with fourteen railway administrations, including nine Prussian administrations, as well as the ferry service across the English Channel between Dover and Ostend.

The train left Paris and Ostend (with connection from London) and travelled via Brussels, Cologne, Hanover, Berlin, Königsberg (now Kaliningrad) and Dvinsk (now Daugavpils) to Saint Petersburg. Passengers to and from Russia had to change once in East Prussia at the German/Russian border because Russian railway tracks are of a wider gauge than those in Western Europe. In Paris there was a connecting service to the Sud Express (Southern Express) to Lisbon.

=== Interwar period ===
Route of the Nord Express and its through coaches and connections between 1925 and 1939.

After World War I and the Russian Revolution the train's route was shortened to Warsaw and Riga instead of Saint Petersburg. Riga joined the connection in 1923, with a separate Riga–Moscow line introduced as well.

=== Post-War Period ===
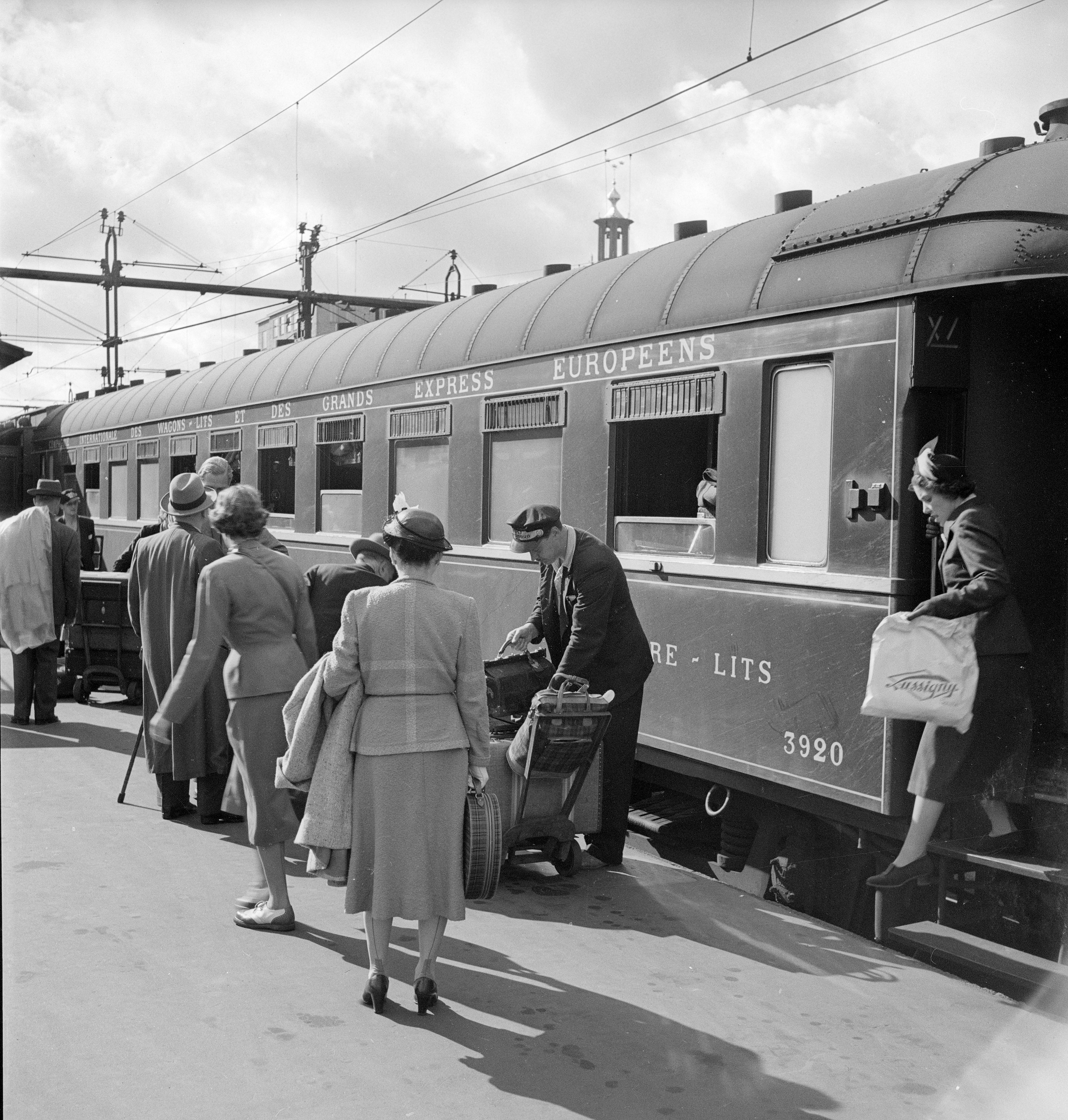
The Nord Express in Stockholm Central Station in the 1940s.

After World War II the "Iron Curtain" divided Europe, and the initially luxury and since 1951 ordinary night train's route was diverted further from Paris via Hamburg and Copenhagen to Stockholm and Oslo.

The emergence of air travel and high-speed rail caused the demise of the famous train line. In 2007 it was shortened further and such that it ran between Paris and Hamburg, taking 10.5 hours.

In 1986, the Aachen-Copenhagen service was shortened. The Ostend-Copenhagen through carriages were taken over from the D 241 Ost-West-Express at Aachen.

==== EuroNight ====
From December 14, 1997, the Nord Express from Aachen to Copenhagen operated with modern DB Nachtzug AG equipment, including double-decker sleeper cars, as EN 233, 232 Nord-Express.

On December 9, 2007, the Nord Express was discontinued, and the service continued as CNL 40347, 40348 Borealis from Amsterdam until the closure of all DB night trains in 2016.

== In the arts ==
The Nord Express has received significantly less attention than the Orient Express. Nevertheless, it is one of the CIWL's best-known luxury trains and has been featured in a number of novels and films:

- Georges Simenon's detective novel The Strange Case of Peter the Lett (1931) starts with the arrival of the Nord Express at the Gare du Nord in Paris. It is the first novel to feature Inspector Jules Maigret who would later appear in more than a hundred stories by Simenon and who has become a legendary figure in the annals of detective fiction.
- Vladimir Nabokov describes in the seventh chapter of Speak, Memory how he traveled on the Nord Express from Saint Petersburg to France for a holiday in 1906.
- Alfred Hitchcock's movie Strangers on a Train (1951), was translated to French as "L'inconnu du Nord-Express" (The unknown man in the Nord-Express).
- The animated 20th Century Fox movie, Anastasia (1997) mentioned that the train was traveling from Saint Petersburg to Paris, which was most likely referring to the Nord Express.
- The final conflict of The Silver Skates revolves around gaining passage to Paris on the Nord Express.

== See also ==
- Famous trains
