= Katharine Waldo Douglas =

American novelist

Katharine Waldo Douglas CBE
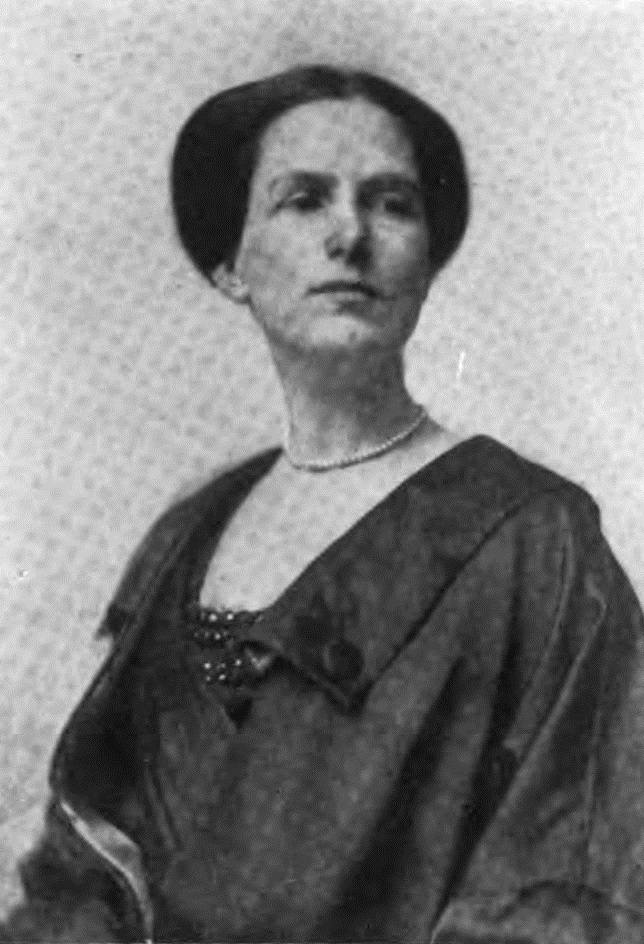
- Born: 1871; Tarrytown, New York, United States
- Died: April 7, 1939 (aged 67–68); Tolosa, Spain
- Spouses: Francis Kinloch Hunter (m. 1894, divorced); Romilly Fedden (m. 1905; died 1939)
- Writing career
- Notable work: The Sign (1912)

Katharine Waldo Douglas CBE (1871 – April 7, 1939), professionally known as Mrs. Romilly Fedden or Katharine Fedden, was an American novelist, nonfiction writer, and translator. She published several novels as well as works on France and the Basque Country, and translated works by Auguste Rodin and Paul Morand from French into English. During the First World War, she organized hospital-supply relief work in London and was appointed a Commander of the Order of the British Empire (CBE) in 1919.

== Early life and education ==
Douglas was born Katharine Waldo Douglas in 1871 in Tarrytown, New York, to Henry Livingston and Hortense Pauline (Armstrong) Douglas. Known as Kittie as a child, she had two brothers, Archibald and Percy. She was educated at the Masters School in Dobbs Ferry, New York.

== Career ==
Douglas's first novel, The Sign, was published in 1912. The plot of the book centers on the interactions of a young Breton girl and three painters living in Brittany. A review in The New York Times Book Review found it to be "well written, interesting, haunting."

She subsequently published the novels The Spare Room (1913), Shifting Sands (1914), The Rock (1915), and The Peacock's Tail (1925). Douglas also contributed to the periodicals Outlook, Evening Post, and The Atlantic.

Douglas wrote two nonfiction books: The Basque Country (1921) and Manor Life in Old France: From the Journal of Sire de Gouberville for the Years 1549–1562 (1933). Her husband, Romilly Fedden, illustrated both books. Her translations from the French include Art by Auguste Rodin (from Paul Gsell's French text) and 1900 A. D. by Paul Morand.

== War work and honors ==
Douglas served as honorary organizer and chairman of the Belgrave War Hospital Supply Depot in London from 1915 to 1919 during World War I. In 1917, she supported the American Receiving and Distributing Service of the American Red Cross. For her wartime service, Douglas was appointed a Member of the Order of the British Empire (MBE) in 1918 and promoted to Commander of the Order of the British Empire (CBE) in 1919.

== Personal life ==
Douglas had two marriages. She married Francis Kinloch Hunter on January 6, 1894, in Tarrytown, New York. The couple had two children and later divorced. On December 3, 1905, she married the artist Romilly Fedden. They lived in Chantemesle, France. Their son, Robin Fedden, later published the memoir Chantemesle. Douglas was injured in the crash of the Sud Express near Tolosa, Spain, on March 29, 1939, and died from her injuries on April 7.
