= Helen Fraser (executive) =

British executive and publisher

Dame Helen Fraser DBE
- Born: Helen Jean Sutherland Fraser; 8 June 1949 (age 76)
- Education: Collegiate Girls' School, Leicester
- Alma mater: St Anne's College, Oxford
- Occupations: Editor and publisher
- Spouse: Grant James McIntyre (m. 1982)
- Children: Four

Dame Helen Jean Sutherland Fraser, DBE (born 8 June 1949) is a British executive and publisher. From 2010 to 2016, she was the chief executive officer of the Girls' Day School Trust. She previously worked in publishing, and was an editor then managing director at a number of publishers including Heinemann and Penguin UK.

== Early life and education ==
Fraser was born on 8 June 1949. Her father was George Sutherland Fraser, the poet and literary critic. She was educated at the Collegiate Girls' School, an all-girls grammar school in Leicester. She studied English language and literature at St Anne's College, Oxford, and graduated with a Bachelor of Arts (BA) degree in 1970; as per tradition, her BA was later promoted to a Master of Arts (MA Oxon) degree.

== Career ==
After graduating from university in 1970, Fraser spent nine months teaching English in Paris, France. She then went travelling in Southeast Asia with the money she had earned teaching.

In 1972, Fraser joined Methuen Publishing as a "trainee-cum-secretary". By her second year with the company she was commissioning books; one of her first was The Novels of Virginia Woolf by Hermione Lee. In 1974, she left Methuen to start an independent publishing company with two colleagues: it was called Open Books, specialised in academic works, and was funded by Mitchell Beazley. Mitchell Beazley withdrew their funding from the company in 1976.

In 1976, Fraser joined Fontana as a non-fiction editor. She helped edit the Fontana Modern Masters alongside the series editor Frank Kermode. In 1981, she was promoted to editorial director at William Collins, the parent company of Fontana. She was made head of Flamingo, the "literary paperback list", and also became involved in hardback publishing in 1986. She was fired from William Collins in 1987.

Fraser joined Heinemann in 1987 as a publisher. She moved to its subsidiary Reed Trade Books in 1992 as publishing director before being appointed managing director in 1996. She moved to Penguin Books in January 1997 as managing director of its general division. In 2001, she was appointed managing director of Penguin UK. She stepped down from that role in 2009.

In January 2010, Fraser became the chief executive officer of the Girls' Day School Trust, a group of private schools in England and Wales. She retired in August 2016. She was succeeded as CEO by Cheryl Giovannoni.

== Personal life ==
On 15 April 1982, Fraser married Grant James McIntyre. Together they have four children: two daughters and two step daughters.

Fraser is an Anglican Christian. From 2013 to 2018 she served as a churchwarden of St Bride's Church, Fleet Street, London.

== Honours ==
In the 2010 New Year Honours, Fraser was appointed a Commander of the Order of the British Empire (CBE) "for services to the publishing industry". On 14 July 2010, she was awarded an honorary Doctor of Letters (DLitt) degree by the University of Bristol. In the 2017 New Year Honours, she was promoted to Dame Commander of the Order of the British Empire (DBE) for "services to education", thereby granting her the title dame.
