= Keith Bullen (poet) =

British poet (died 1946)

Keith Brebner Bullen (died 30 July 1946) was a British poet and teacher who was part of the Salamander group in Cairo during World War II.

== Early life and schools ==
Bullen was the son of W A Bullen who had emigrated to Cape Town in 1891, and was born and brought up in Cape Town. In the 1920s he was a member of the teaching staff at The English School, in Cairo. At the school he met, and married in 1928, Wanda Tomlinson the daughter of Robert George Tomlinson, Director of Salt's Brewery in Burton on Trent. They returned to England to set up a preparatory school at Malvern. Bullen, though a brilliant English scholar was no businessman and the school failed in 1934. He returned to Cairo to work for the British Council. They were appointed by the council to run the Gezira Preparatory School, a British Council School in a Cairo suburb. The school was attended by Edward Said.

== Poetry ==
During his time in Cairo Bullen ran an "open house" on Sunday mornings which became a centre for poets and art lovers. These informal meetings were welcome to all regardless of nationality, colour or creed, and in 1941 came to the attention of members of the allied forces in Cairo. Bullen co-founded the Salamander Society of poets and writers, along with John Waller and John Cromer Braun, an intelligence officer. The society rescued the work of the Cairo poets when they had been posted all over the Middle East and published it in Salamander: A Miscellany of Poetry. The 5,000-copy edition sold out in six weeks. Bullen also wrote and published his own poetry including translations from French poets.

== Mrs Bullen's schools ==
Bullen died in 1946, but his widow founded her own school, Manor House School, in Zamalek, Cairo. This was in a flourishing condition and had just opened a new branch in Mohandeseen, Cairo, when sequestered by the Egyptian authorities at the time of the Suez Crisis. Mrs Bullen and her daughter Anne moved to Beirut where they reopened the school. However, after the outbreak of trouble in the Lebanon they had to leave. In 1976 at the request of the Egyptian government, Mrs Bullen, now aged 72, and her daughter reopened the Manor House School in Heliopolis, Cairo. A year later in 1977, the Mohandeseen branch was opened, and the school had 600 pupils. Mrs Bullen died in 1979.

== Publications ==
- Salamander:A Miscellany of Poetry
- We stand alone... and other war sonnets
- Bells on the Breeze and other poems
- Charles Baudelaire:Un Poete Maudit
- Albert Samain: Un Pastelliste Exquis
- Alfred de Musset:Souvenir and other poems
- Paul Verlaine:Un Poete Saturnien
