= Alamein to Zem Zem =

Book by Keith Douglas

- Author: Keith Douglas
- Language: English
- Genre: memoir
- Publisher: Editions Poetry London; Faber and Faber; Penguin Modern Classics; Oxford University Press
- Publication date: 1946 (hardback); 1966, 1969, 1979, 1992 (paperback)
- Publication place: United Kingdom
- Media type: Print
- Pages: 152

Alamein to Zem Zem is a military memoir of the Western Desert campaign of World War II written by the British soldier-poet Keith Douglas shortly before he was killed in action in Normandy on 9 June 1944. It was first published in 1946.

The book is mainly a personal account of Douglas’s experiences as a young tank commander in the Sherwood Rangers Yeomanry with the British Eighth Army at the Second Battle of El Alamein in October–November 1942. His squadron was equipped with Crusader tanks. Zem Zem is the name of a wadi in Tunisia where Douglas was wounded in early 1943. His commanding officer (referred to as 'Piccadilly Jim' in the book) was killed on 22 March 1943.

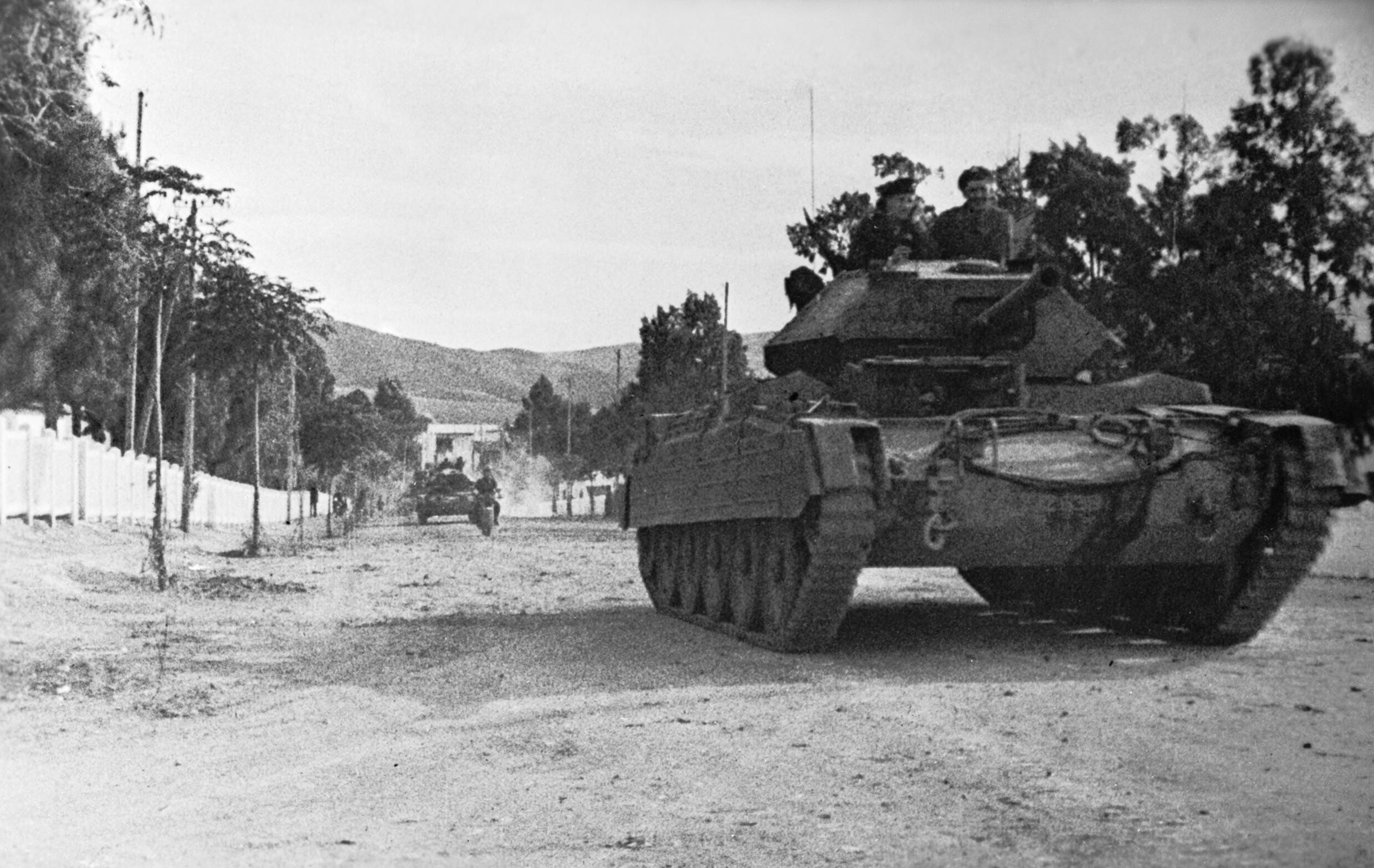
Crusader Mk III tanks in Tunisia, 31 December 1942

Desmond Graham, Douglas’s biographer and editor, wrote: “This narrative, like his poems of the Desert War, is unique in the literature of its period, in that no other British poet of Douglas’s quality had battle experience and survived long enough to write of it.”

Alamein to Zem Zem was first published by Editions Poetry London in 1946 and republished by Faber and Faber (1966), Penguin Modern Classics (1969), Oxford University Press (1979) and again by Faber and Faber (1992).
