= Romilly Fedden =

English artist and watercolourist

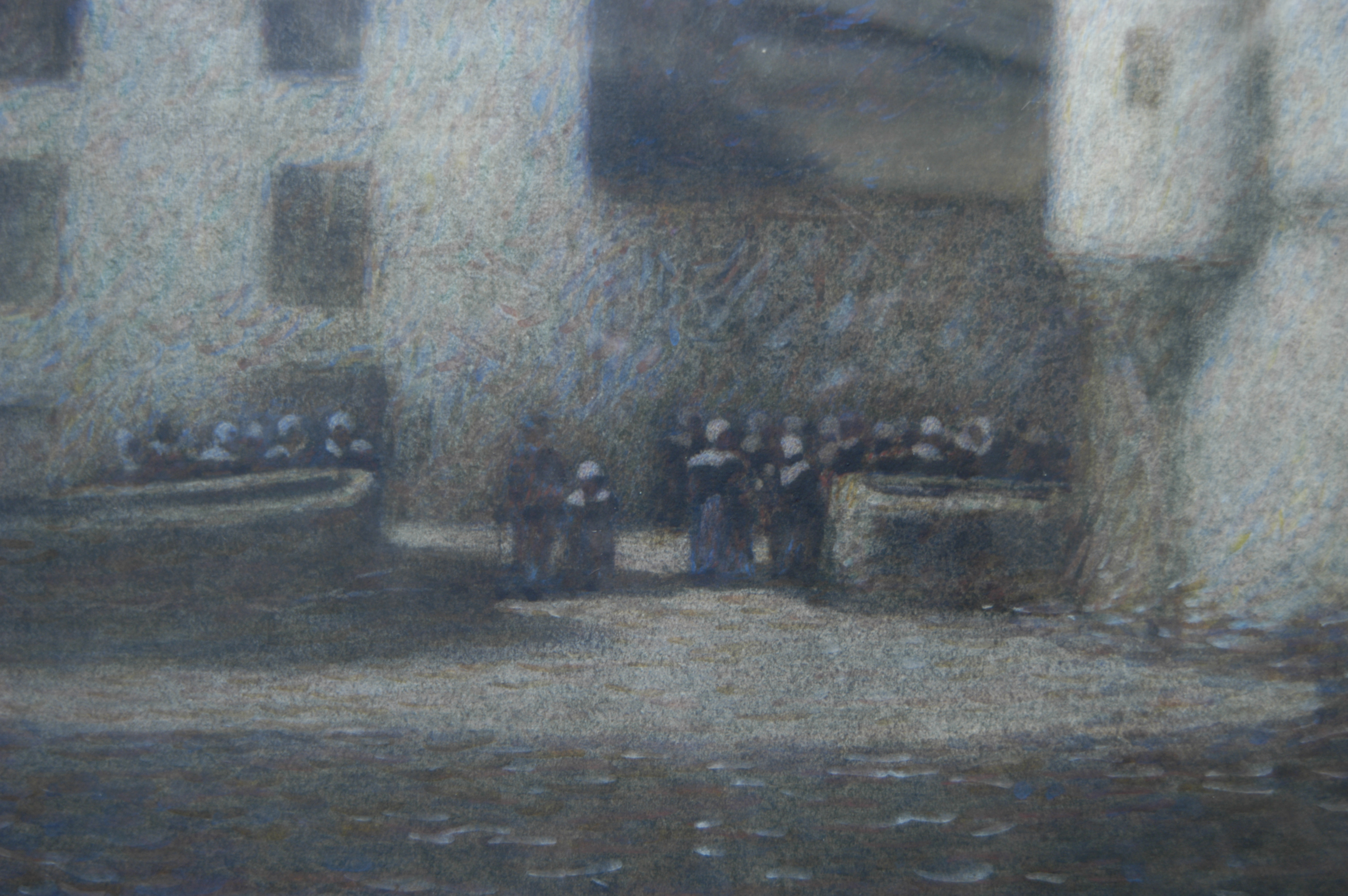
Breton women in part of the watercolour Moonlight, Quimperlé, June 1902.

Arthur Romilly Fedden (1875–1939) was an English artist and watercolourist. The son of businessman Henry Fedden, his younger brother was the engineer Roy Fedden.

Romilly studied under Hubert von Herkomer at Bushey, at the Académie Julian in Paris, and finally in Spain. He lived and worked in France, in a place called Chantemesle near Vétheuil on the Seine. He was married to Katharine Waldo Douglas, an American writer; their son Robin Fedden was also a writer.

Romilly Fedden wrote two books: Modern Water Colour (1918) and Golden Days from the Fishing Log of a Painter in Brittany (1919). He also illustrated a book written by his wife on the Basque country.

He died from injuries sustained in the crash of the Sud Express in March 1939. His wife, who was also injured, died soon after him.
