= Victor Selwyn =

British journalist

Victor Selwyn MBE (1917–2005) was a British journalist whose career began during World War II with a collection of poems from soldiers. It was this work that led him to attain his MBE in 1996 He was associated with the Cairo poets, and was — along with Denis Saunders and David Burk — an editor of Oasis which grew into the Salamander Oasis Trust of which he was serving as editor-in-chief when he died.
