= J. C. Hall (poet) =

English poet and editor

- Born: John Clive Hall; 12 September 1920; Ealing, London
- Died: 14 October 2011 (aged 91); Tunbridge Wells, Kent
- Education: Oriel College, Oxford
- Occupation: Poet
- Writing career
- Language: English

John Clive Hall (12 September 1920 – 14 October 2011) was an English poet and editor.

== Poetry ==
Hall's poetry was first published when he was aged seventeen in the anthology, The Best Poems of 1938. He subsequently wrote and published a trickle of short poems over seven further decades. Not a modernist, he was included in Dannie Abse's 'reactionary anthology' Mavericks. His work was admired by Philip Larkin who described it as, "just the sort of thing I should like to have done myself" and by W. H. Auden who wrote "in the poems of J. C. Hall we see a craftsmanship that yields to the reader constant pleasure and enjoyment. J. C. Hall should be better known." A Trevor Tolley judged "his work has a carefulness that makes one ready to accept his small output as a mark of spiritual and poetic integrity".

== Life ==
Born in Ealing, London and brought up in Tunbridge Wells, Hall attended Leighton Park School and Oriel College, Oxford. He was an editor of the literary periodical Fords and Bridges at Oxford and became good friends with Keith Douglas. As a pacifist he did farm work during the war and when Douglas was killed in Normandy, Hall was named as his literary executor. He worked at The London Magazine and at Stephen Spender's Encounter as an editor. He edited the Collected Poems of Edwin Muir for Faber and Faber in 1952. A group photographic portrait of Hall, with fellow poets Dannie Abse, David John Murray Wright, Anthony Cronin and John Smith is held by the National Portrait Gallery.

== Bibliography ==
=== Poetry collections ===
- The Summer Dance and Other Poems (John Lehmann, London 1951)
- The Burning Hare (Chatto & Windus / Hogarth Press 1966 )
- A House of Voices (Phoenix Living Poet Series, Chatto & Windus/Hogarth, 1973)
- Selected and New Poems 1939–84 (Secker & Warburg, 1986)
- Long Shadows (Shoestring 2003, repr. Faber & Faber 2010)

=== Anthologies and Shared Collections ===
- Selected Poems (Keith Douglas, J.C. Hall, Norman Nicholson) (1943)
- Mavericks: An Anthology, (Howard Sergeant and Dannie Abse (eds), Editions Poetry and Poverty, London, 1957)

== Sources ==
- Noel-Tod, Jeremy; Hamilton, Ian (2013). The Oxford Companion to Modern Poetry in English. Oxford: Oxford University Press. ISBN 9780199640256.
