= Wrey Gardiner =

English writer, poet, and publisher (1901-1981)

Charles Wrey Gardiner (1901 – 13 March 1981) was an English writer and poet, editor and publisher, born in Plymouth.

Gardiner was a noted and well-connected literary figure, particularly in London in the years around Second World War, though very much in the tradition of the literary amateur.

== Personal life ==
Gardiner read History at Exeter College, Oxford, but left without taking a degree after marrying his cousin, Betty. The couple then toured the West Country in a caravan. After divorce, Gardiner moved to Paris, where he married his second wife, Susanne, a pianist. After the Second World War he married and had at least one child with Cynthia Kortright. His fourth wife, Diana, was the widow of the Fitzrovian writer Julian MacLaren-Ross.

== Publishing ==
His significance in publishing came with his editorship of the magazine Poetry Quarterly. He became its assistant editor in 1939, with its first edition published in Spring 1940 and continuing until 1953.

Towards the end of 1940 he established the Grey Walls Press, in Billericay, Essex. Lyra: An anthology of new lyric (1942), edited by Alex Comfort and Robert Greacen, was a representative poetry anthology published by Grey Walls, containing new writing of the time. Gardiner is also notable as a supporter of Kenneth Patchen, whose Outlaw of the Lowest Planet he published in 1946, with an introduction by David Gascoyne and a preface by Alex Comfort.

Grey Walls subsequently merged with Falcon Press, the publishing company run by Peter Baker MP. Initially, this gave the company new capital but it later involved Grey Walls in Baker's bankruptcy. He was imprisoned for fraud and the Press went out of business.

As a writer and poet, his works include his poetry as well as four published (and one unpublished - The Octopus of Love) autobiographies.

== New Road ==
New Road. New Directions in Art & Writing was a series of anthologies published by Grey Walls Press, the first two of which were edited by Alex Comfort and John Bayliss. These are:

- Volume 1 (1943) - Edited by Alex Comfort and John Bayliss - including a special 50-page surrealist section
- Volume 2 (1944) - Edited by Alex Comfort and John Bayliss
- Volume 3 (1945) - Edited by Fred Marnau
- Volume 4 (1946) - Edited by Fred Marnau
- Volume 5 (1949) - Edited by Charles Wrey Gardiner

== Publications ==
- The Colonies of Heaven (1938, autobiography)
- Laid in Sharp Scorpions: Poems (1941)
- The Chained Tree (1941, poems)
- The Last Refuge (1941, poems)
- The Once-Loved God (1943, autobiography)
- The Gates of Silence (1944, poems)
- The Dark Thorn (1946, autobiography)
- Carrots (1946, by Jules Renard, translated by G. W. Stonier )
- Sharp Scorpions (1946, poems)
- Lament for Strings (1947, poems)
- A Season of Olives (1948, first novel)
- The Flowering Moment (1949, poems)
- The Answer to Life is No (1960, autobiography)
- His Poems (1980)
