= Alan Rook =

British Cairo poet

(William) Alan Rook OBE (1909–1990) was a British Cairo poet and edited the 1936 issue of New Oxford Poetry.

== As a soldier ==
In the Second World War Rook served as a Lieutenant anti-aircraft gunner with the 6th A.A. Division of the Royal Artillery. After evacuation at Dunkirk he served in searchlight operations with an anti-aircraft unit, defending the East End of London during the Blitz. He rose to the rank of Major. He left a vivid diary of the Blitz experience. He left the Army in 1944, invalided out. He continued an interest in targeting and weapons after the war, becoming a keen archer.

== As a poet ==
His first book of poems was published in 1938, and three further books during the war. During the war, and in the decade after 1945, he was best known in Britain as a war poet. His best known poem was ""Dunkirk," which was considered the finest poem inspired by the war." and it "became famous in tent and household". He was a good friend of fellow conservative poets such as J.R.R. Tolkien and C.S. Lewis, and may have been one of Tolkien's students in the 1930s. He became a Fellow of the Royal Society of Literature.

He rejected Modernism in verse, although like many others he had been influenced by T.S. Eliot in the 1930s. His traditional approach in poetry, and his stern themes of 'life and death in struggle', must have contributed to the neglect and near-forgetting of his work amid the changed intellectual tastes of the 1970s and 80s. By the time he died in 1990 he and his works appear to have been utterly forgotten.

== As a journalist and critic ==
His book Not as a refuge (1948) is on the writing of poetry. He was also known as an occasional critic and reviewer. In 1944 he took up the editorship of the Christian literary and critical magazine Kingdom Come: The Magazine of War-Time Oxford, aided by fellow editors Henry Treece and Stefan Schimanski. They later published the book Leaves in the storm: a book of diaries (1947), with excerpts from the Second World War diaries of twenty-five poets.

He was a wartime broadcaster around 1944, presenting scripted overseas radio broadcasts on poetry and its history for the BBC, under its Indian Service producer George Orwell. One letter from George Orwell, arranging these talks with Rook, indicates that Rook knew Herbert Read.

Later Rook wrote many articles of first-hand travel journalism on wine and wine landscapes, such as "Around Portugal" for Wine and Food, using his abilities as a poet to bring such places to life on the page.

== Wine ==
After the Second World War, Rook entered the family business of Skinner & Rook (later Skinner, Rook & Chambers) in Nottingham in the East Midlands. This business was styled a "Grocers and Tea and Wine Merchants". Rook had expanded the business into wine in 1947 and he became a noted wine trader and wine taster. He served as a chairman of the Wine and Spirits Association of Great Britain, around 1965.

He published A Diary of an English Vineyard (1971), a description of the work and success of the most northerly commercial vineyard in Europe, which he had planted in the form of 2,500 vines at Stragglethorpe Hall in Lincolnshire in 1964. The vineyard produced its first 100gc marketable crop in 1969, and the wine made there was a white Burgundy type and sold under Rook's "Lincolnshire Imperial" brand. A photograph of the rear of his earlier residence at Wootton Lodge shows that he had had a vineyard on the slopes there.

== Wootton Lodge ==
In 1950 his success in the Midlands wine trade meant that he could purchase and live at the 17th-century Grade I listed Wootton Lodge, near Ellastone in north Staffordshire. His success in converting the historic house into manageable living space for himself and his playwright partner Dennis Woodford, at a time when many other mansions were being abandoned or mismanaged, was lauded by Country Life magazine in a 1959 article on him and his house. The article noted that at that time Rook was also known as a playwright. He invited many notable writers to stay at the house.
