= Oasis (anthology) =

1943 literary anthology

Oasis was a 1943 literary anthology published in Cairo during World War II. It was edited by Denis Saunders, David Burk, and Victor Selwyn, all then serving in the armed forces. The introduction was written by General Henry Maitland Wilson, who was at this time Commander-in-Chief of the Middle East.

The Palestine Post reviewed the collection: "The poems were written by men under the stress of war in the desert, in the air and on the sea, under the impact of countries and people strangely new to them."

== Notes ==
1. In January 1944 Wilson was made Supreme Allied Commander in the Mediterranean, and became a Field Marshal at the end of 1944.
2. The Palestine Post, an English language newspaper founded in 1932, changed its name to The Jerusalem Post in 1950.
