= Poetry London (1939–1951) =

Poetry London: A Bi-Monthly of Modern Verse and Criticism was a leading London-based literary periodical published intermittently between 1939 and 1951. It was edited by Meary James Thurairajah Tambimuttu.

Contributors included Dylan Thomas, Herbert Read, Stephen Spender, George Barker, Lawrence Durrell and Kathleen Raine.
