= Meary James Thurairajah Tambimuttu =

Tamil poet, editor, critic and publisher (1915–1983)

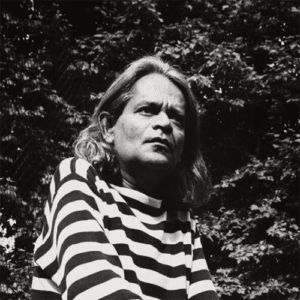
- Born: 15 August 1915; British Ceylon
- Died: 23 June 1983 (aged 67); London, England
- Occupations: Editor, poet
- Spouses: Jacqueline Stanley (1940–1941); Safia Tyabji (1950–1983); Esta Smith (1960–1965)
- Writing career
- Pen name: Tambimuttu
- Period: 1938–83
- Genre: Poetry

Meary James Thurairajah Tambimuttu (or simply Tambimuttu; 15 August 1915 – 23 June 1983) was a Tamil poet, editor, critic and publisher, who for many years played a significant part in the literary scenes of London and New York City. In 1939 he founded the respected literary magazine Poetry London, which "soon became the best known poetry periodical in England, and Tambimuttu became widely known as a skillful editor." Four issues of Poetry London–New York were published in the 1950s; the fifth in 1960. Among those published by Tambimuttu were Lawrence Durrell, Kathleen Raine, W. H. Auden, Gavin Ewart, Jack Kerouac, Gregory Corso, Allen Ginsberg, Roy Campbell, Robin Skelton, Keith Douglas, Norman Nicholson, and many other notable writers. In 1955 Tambimuttu was described by The New York Times as "probably the best-known contemporary Indian poet". He created two publishing houses, Editions Poetry London (established in 1943) and Lyrebird Press (1968), both of which published major works.

== Biography ==
Tambimuttu was born in British Ceylon (now Sri Lanka), had his primary education at the premier Catholic institution St. Joseph's College, Colombo, and attended university in Colombo before leaving for London at the age of 22. He arrived in 1938, and a year later he began to publish Poetry London, a small magazine that was to be important in the next decade, in particular during the war years. Tambi, as he was called by his friends, met Lawrence Durrell at this time in connection with the small magazine that Durrell published in Paris, Delta (developing from The Booster). As well as editing 14 volumes of Poetry London, Tambi was also involved in book publishing, writing his own poetry and short fiction, as well as being a regular participant in the BBC radio broadcasts Talking To India during World War II.

In July 1943 he set up the publishing house Editions Poetry London, which published Elizabeth Smart's By Grand Central Station I Sat Down and Wept, David Gascoyne Poems 1937-1942, Lawrence Durrell's Cefalu, Henry Miller's The Cosmological Eye and Sunday After the War, Vladimir Nabokov's The Real Life of Sebastian Knight, Keith Douglas' Alamein to Zem Zem, and Cleanth Brooks' Modern Poetry and the Tradition. Other poets published in Poetry London are a veritable "who's who" of late modernist poetry. In 1943, Tambimuttu commissioned the young artist Lucian Freud to illustrate a book of poems by Nicholas Moore entitled The Glass Tower. It was published the following year by Editions Poetry London and comprised, among other drawings, a stuffed zebra and a palm tree.

Tambimuttu returned to Ceylon in 1949, and in 1952 moved to the United States, where he worked as an editor, launching Poetry London – New York (1956–60), the last issue 5 including American Beat poets.

He returned to London in 1968 and founded the Lyrebird Press. He became important to the development of the October Gallery, which opened in 1979, and where he maintained an office, introducing many Indian and Sri Lankan artists and poets to the gallery. He died aged 67 in London. Archives of Tambimuttu's correspondence and papers are dispersed, but the largest collections are at Northwestern University and the British Library.

Most of Tambimuttu's own works are difficult to access, and his earliest works published before he came to London are lost. His greatest influence was as an editor and publisher, especially during the 1940s. T. S. Eliot, Lawrence Durrell, Dylan Thomas count among his influences, while he influenced Lawrence Durrell, Elizabeth Smart, Nicholas Moore, Kathleen Raine, Gavin Maxwell, and George Barker.

== Works ==
=== Poetry ===
- Natarajah: A Poem for Mr. T. S. Eliot's Sixtieth Birthday (1948), PL Pamphlets
- Out of this War (1941), The Fortune Press

=== Editor ===
- T. S. Eliot: A Symposium compiled by Richard March and Tambimuttu (1948), Editions Poetry London
- Poetry in Wartime: An Anthology (1942), Faber and Faber
- India Love Poems (1977), Editions Poetry London
