= Robert Greacen =

Irish poet

- Born: 24 October 1920; Derry, Ireland
- Died: 13 April 2008 (aged 87); Dublin, Ireland
- Education: Methodist College Belfast, Trinity College Dublin
- Occupation: Poet
- Years active: 1941–2008
- Spouse: Patricia Hutchins

Robert Greacen (24 October 1920 – 13 April 2008) was an Irish poet and member of Aosdána.

== Life ==
He was born in Derry, Ireland, on 24 October 1920. He was the only child of Henry Greacen and Elizabeth McCrea Greacen.

He was educated at Methodist College Belfast and Queen’s University Belfast. While studying history and English at QUB he and Roy McFadden edited The Northman student magazine. In 1943 he joined Trinity College Dublin to study social work.

In 1948, Greacen and his wife Patricia moved to London, where he worked with the United Nations Association, and taught in several colleges, including the City of London College, the City Literary Institute, and West London College. He returned to Dublin in 1986.

Greacen described himself as a socialist for most of his life.

He died on 13 April 2008 in Dublin, Ireland.

Greacen's literary career included poetry, reviewing, and editing.

His papers are in the library of the University of Ulster at Coleraine.

== Publications ==
His published poetry collections include The Bird (1941), Northern Harvest (Belfast, Derrick MacCord, 1944), One Recent Evening (1944), The Undying Day (London, The Falcon Press, 1948), A Garland for Captain Fox (Dublin, The Gallery Press, 1975), I, Brother Stephen (Dublin, St. Beuno's, 1978), Young Mr Gibbon (1979), A Bright Mask, (Dublin, The Dedalus Press, 1985), Protestant Without a Horse (Belfast, The Lagan Press, 1997), Carnival at The River (Dublin; Dedalus;, 1990); Collected Poems (Lagan Press, 1995), Lunch at the Ivy (Lagan Press, 2002), and Selected & New Poems (ed. by Jack W. Weaver, Cliffs of Moher, Salmon Publishing, 2006).

His autobiography, Even Without Irene, was published by the Dolmen Press in 1969 and re-issued in 1995 by Lagan Press. An expanded autobiography, The Sash My Father Wore, was published in Edinburgh by Mainstream Publishing in 1997.

He was elected to membership of Aosdána in 1986.

Robert Greacen: Collected Poems 1944-1994 won the Irish Times Award for Literature in 1995.

== Personal life ==
He was married to the late Patricia Hutchins, author of Ezra Pound's Kensington and James Joyce's Dublin. They had one daughter, Arethusa Greacen, who resides in Ireland.
