= Keith Douglas =

English poet and soldier (1920–1944)

- Born: Keith Castellain Douglas; 24 January 1920; Tunbridge Wells, Kent, England
- Died: 9 June 1944 (aged 24) near Bayeux, Normandy, German-occupied France
- Resting place: Tilly-sur-Seulles War Cemetery, Calvados, France
- Education: Merton College, Oxford
- Occupation: Poet
- Writing career
- Language: English

Keith Castellain Douglas (24 January 1920 – 9 June 1944) was an English poet and soldier noted for his war poetry during the Second World War and his wry memoir of the Western Desert campaign, Alamein to Zem Zem. He was killed in action during the invasion of Normandy.

== Poetry ==
Douglas described his poetic style as "extrospective"; that is, he focused on external impressions rather than inner emotions or feelings. The result is a poetry which, according to his detractors, can be cold, even callous, in the midst of war's atrocities. For others, Douglas's work is powerful and unsettling because its exact descriptions eschew egotism and shift the burden of emotion from the poet to the reader. His best poetry is generally considered to rank alongside the 20th century's finest soldier-poetry.

In his poem, "Desert Flowers" (1943), Douglas mentions World War I poet Isaac Rosenberg, claiming that he is only repeating what Rosenberg has already written.

== Early life ==
Douglas was born in Tunbridge Wells, Kent, the son of Capt. Keith Sholto Douglas, MC (retired) and Marie Josephine Castellain. His mother became unwell and collapsed in 1924 of encephalitis lethargica, never to fully recover. By 1926, the chicken farm business set up by his father had failed. Douglas was sent to Edgeborough School, a preparatory school in Guildford, the same year. The family became increasingly poor, and his father had to leave home in early 1928 to seek better employment in Wales. The persistent ill-health of Marie led to the collapse of the marriage of his parents by the end of that year, and his father remarried in 1930. Douglas was deeply hurt by his father not communicating with him after 1928, and when Capt. Keith did write at last in 1938, Douglas did not agree to meet him. In one of his letters written in 1940 Douglas looked back on his childhood: "I lived alone during the most fluid and formative years of my life, and during that time I lived on my imagination, which was so powerful as to persuade me that the things I imagined would come true."

=== Education ===
Marie Douglas faced extreme financial distress, so much so that only the generosity of the Edgeborough headmaster Mr. James permitted Douglas to attend school in 1930–1931, his last year there. Douglas sat in 1931 for the entrance examination to Christ's Hospital, where education was free and there was monetary assistance to cover all other costs. He was accepted, and joined Christ's Hospital, near Horsham, in September 1931, studying there till 1938. It was at this school that his considerable poetic talent and artistic ability were recognised. So was his cavalier attitude to authority and property, which nearly led to expulsion in 1935 over a purloined training rifle. In surprising contrast, he excelled as a member of the school's Officers Training Corps, particularly enjoying drill, although he was philosophically opposed to militarism.

=== University ===
After his bruising brush with authority in 1935, Douglas settled down to a less troubled and more productive period at school, during which he excelled both at studies and games, and at the end of which he won an open exhibition to Merton College, Oxford, in 1938 to read History and English. The First World War-veteran and well-known poet Edmund Blunden was his tutor at Merton, and regarded his poetic talent highly. Blunden sent his poems to T. S. Eliot, the doyen of English poetry, who found Douglas's verses 'impressive'. Douglas became the editor of Cherwell, and one of the poets anthologised in the collection Eight Oxford Poets (1941), although by the time that volume appeared he was already in the army. He does not seem to have been acquainted with somewhat junior but contemporary Oxford poets such as Sidney Keyes, Drummond Allison, John Heath-Stubbs and Philip Larkin, who would make names for themselves. At Oxford, he was good friends with the poet J. C. Hall who became his literary executor.

At Oxford, Douglas entered a relationship with a sophisticated Chinese student named Yingcheng, or Betty Sze, the daughter of a diplomat. Her own sentiments towards him were less intense, and she refused to marry him. Yingcheng remained the unrequited love of Douglas's life and the source of his best romantic verse, despite his involvements with other women later, most notably Milena Guttieres Pegna.

== Military service ==
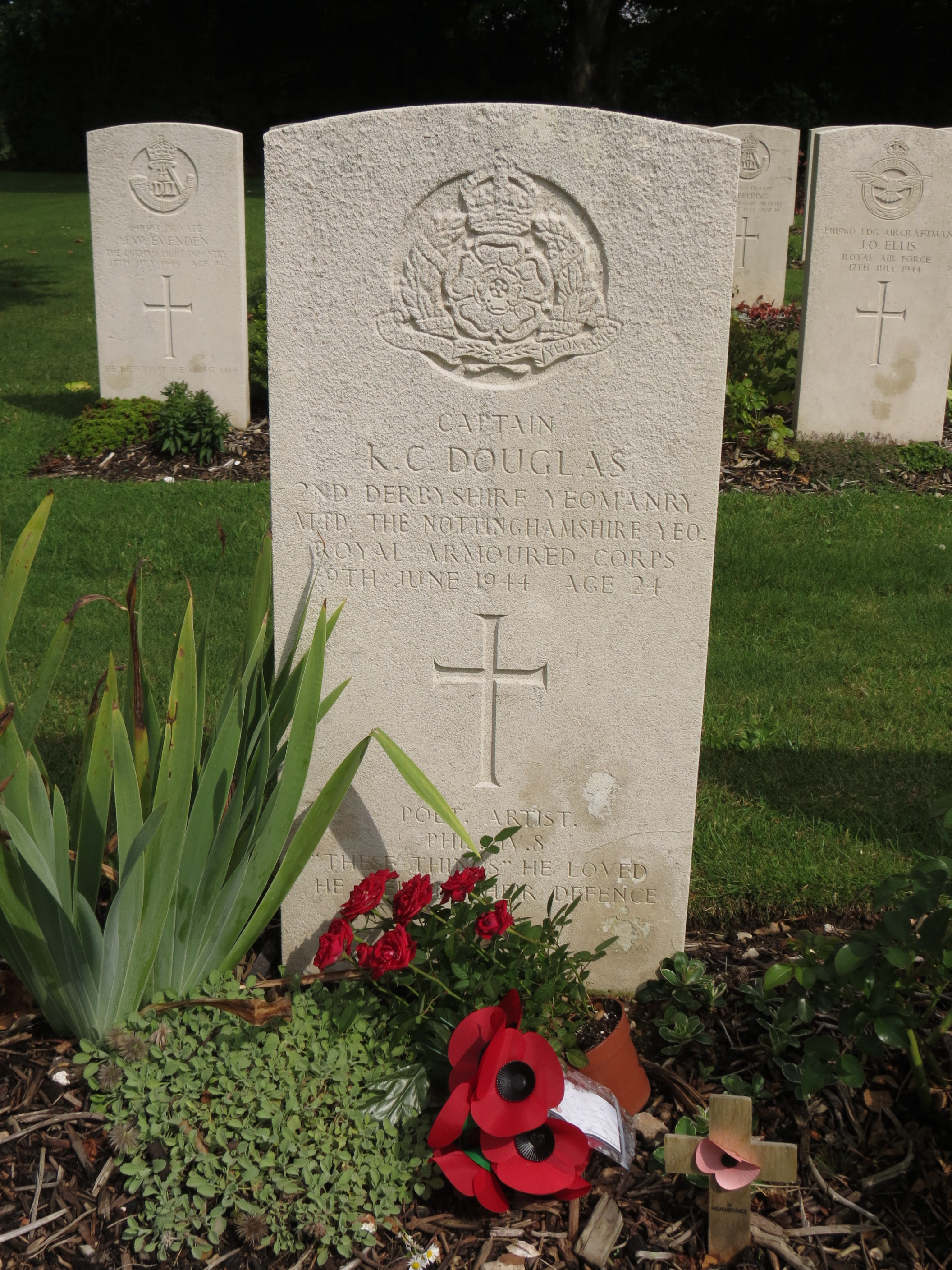
Keith Douglas's grave, in Tilly-sur-Seulles War Cemetery in Normandy

Within days of the declaration of war he reported to an army recruiting centre with the intention of joining a cavalry regiment, but like many others keen to serve he had to wait, and it was not until July 1940 that he started his training. After attending the Royal Military College, Sandhurst, he was commissioned on 1 February 1941 into the 2nd Derbyshire Yeomanry at Ripon. He was posted to the Middle East in July 1941 and transferred to the Nottinghamshire (Sherwood Rangers) Yeomanry. Posted initially at Cairo and Palestine, he found himself stuck at headquarters twenty miles behind El Alamein as a camouflage officer as the Second Battle of El Alamein began.

At dawn on 24 October 1942, the Regiment advanced, and suffered numerous casualties from enemy anti-tank guns. Chafing at the inactivity, Douglas took off against orders on 27 October, drove to the Regimental HQ in a truck and reported to the C.O., Colonel E. O. Kellett, lying that he had been instructed to go to the front (luckily this escapade did not land him in serious trouble; in a reprise of 1935, Douglas got off with an apology). Desperately needing officer replacements, the Colonel posted him to A Squadron, and gave him the opportunity to take part as a fighting tanker in the Eighth Army's victorious sweep through North Africa, vividly recounted in his memoir Alamein to Zem Zem, which was illustrated with his own drawings.

=== Death ===
Captain Douglas returned from North Africa to England in December 1943 and took part in the D-Day invasion of Normandy on 6 June 1944. On 9 June Douglas's armoured unit was pinned down on high ground overlooking Tilly-sur-Seulles. Concerned by the lack of progress, Douglas dismounted his tank to undertake a personal reconnaissance during which he was killed by a German mortar. The regimental chaplain Captain Leslie Skinner buried him by a hedge, close to where he had died on "forward slopes point 102". Shortly after the war his remains were reburied at Tilly-sur-Seulles War Cemetery (14 km south of Bayeux) in plot 1, row E, grave number 2.

== Play ==
A one-man play about Douglas and his work, entitled Unicorns, almost, written by Owen Sheers, premiered at the Hay Festival in May 2018.

== Bibliography ==
- Selected Poems (Keith Douglas, J. C. Hall, Norman Nicholson) (1943)
- Alamein to Zem Zem (1946), reprinted 1966
- Collected Poems (Editions Poetry London 1951), reprinted 1966
- Selected Poems (Faber 1964)
- The Complete Poems (Faber and Faber 1978), reprinted in 1987, 1997, 2011
- Alldritt, Keith. Modernism in the Second World War ISBN 0-8204-0865-4
- The Letters of Keith Douglas edited by Desmond Graham (Carcanet Press, 2000) ISBN 978 1 857544 77 0

== Biography ==
- Keith Douglas, 1920–1944 by Desmond Graham (OUP, 1974) ISBN 0-19-211716-5
