= Bernard Spencer =

Charles Bernard Spencer (1909 – 1963) was an English poet, translator, and editor.

He was born in Madras, India and educated at Marlborough College and Corpus Christi College, Oxford. At Marlborough he knew John Betjeman and Louis MacNeice; at Oxford Stephen Spender, Arthur Calder-Marshall, Isaiah Berlinand he also came across W. H. Auden. He edited Oxford Poetry in 1930-1931. He was not, however, drawn far into what was soon known as the Auden Group; he is identified much more with the type of poetry later exemplified by Lawrence Durrell, and is for some critics the stand-out in the Cairo poets. His potential was never quite fulfilled, partly because of poor health.

After graduation, he made a living from teaching and writing, marrying the actress Norah Gibbs in 1936. At that time he was collaborating on Geoffrey Grigson's New Verse. In World War II he worked for the British Council, in Greece and then Egypt. There he edited the Personal Landscape magazine.

After the war he continued to work for the British Council, being posted to Italy. Norah died in 1947, of tuberculosis. He himself was ill for a time. Through other postings he wrote little.

He was married again in 1961, to Anne Marjoribanks by whom he had a son Piers in 1963. He died in Vienna, apparently in an accident, while once more in bad health.

A conference on Spencer's life and work was held at the University of Reading in October 2009, with an exhibition of manuscripts and other personal effects. His Complete Poetry, Translations and Selected Prose edited by Peter Robinson was published by Bloodaxe Books in February 2011.

== Works ==
- Aegean Islands and Other Poems (1946)
- The Twist in the Plotting (1960)
- With Luck Lasting (1963)
- Collected Poems (1965) edited by Alan Ross
- Collected Poems (1981) edited by Roger Bowen
- Complete Poetry, Translations and Selected Prose (2011) edited by Peter Robinson
