= Penguin poetry anthologies =

The Penguin poetry anthologies are poetry anthologies published by Penguin Books, with individual volumes focusing on particular historical periods, national poetic traditions, historical events, or poetic forms.

== The Penguin Book of Victorian Verse (1997) ==
Edited by Daniel Karlin. The poets included were:

William Allingham - Alexander Anderson - Matthew Arnold - Alfred Austin - W. E. Aytoun - Jane Barlow - William Barnes - Thomas Lovell Beddoes - Hilaire Belloc - A. C. Benson - L. S. Bevington - Laurence Binyon - Samuel Laman Blanchard - Mathilde Blind - Robert Bridges - Anne Brontë - Charlotte Brontë - Shirley Brooks - T. E. Brown - Elizabeth Barrett Browning - Caerleon - C. S. Calverley - William Canton - Lewis Carroll - Elizabeth Charles - John Clare - Arthur Hugh Clough - Hartley Coleridge - Mary E. Coleridge - Mortimer Collins - Eliza Cook - Thomas Cooper - William Johnson Cory - John Davidson - Richard Watson Dixon - Sydney Thompson Dobell - Digby Mackworth Dolben - Alfred Domett - Edward Dowden - Ernest Dowson - R. E. Egerton-Warburton - George Eliot - Ebenezer Elliott - Anne Evans - Sebastian Evans - Michael Field - Edward Fitzgerald - David Gray - John Gray - Dora Greenwell - Thomas Gordon Hake - John Hanmer - Thomas Hardy - Frances Ridley Havergal - Robert Stephen Hawker - W. E. Henley - James Henry - Thomas Hood - Gerard Manley Hopkins - A. E. Housman - Mary Howitt - Leigh Hunt - Jean Ingelow - Lionel Johnson - Ebenezer Jones - Ernest Jones - May Kendall - Harriet Eleanor Hamilton King - Charles Kingsley - Rudyard Kipling - Mary Montgomerie Lamb - Letitia Elizabeth Landon - Walter Savage Landor - William Larminie - Edward Lear - Eugene Lee-Hamilton - Robert Leighton - Amy Levy - Caroline Lindsay - Frederick Locker-Lampson - Alfred Comyns Lyall - Robert Bulwer-Lytton - James Clarence Mangan - Philip Bourke Marston - George Meredith - Alice Meynell - Thomas Miller - F. B. Money-Coutts - Cosmo Monkhouse - William Morris - Arthur Munby - Robert Fuller Murray - Constance Naden - Edith Nesbit - Henry Newbolt - Eliza Ogilvy - George Outram - Coventry Patmore - Emily Pfeiffer - Stephen Phillips - Victor Plarr - May Probyn - Adelaide Anne Procter - Bryan Waller Procter - Dollie Radford - William Brighty Rands - William Renton - James Logie Robertson - Mary F. Robinson - William Caldwell Roscoe - William Stewart Rose - Christina G. Rossetti - George William Russell - Richard Hill Sandys - William Bell Scott - George Augustus Simcox - Joseph Skipsey - Menella Bute Smedley - Alexander Smith - Walter C. Smith - J. K. Stephen - Robert Louis Stevenson - Henry Septimus Sutton - Algernon Charles Swinburne - Arthur Symons - Henry Taylor - Alfred Tennyson - William Makepeace Thackeray - William Thom - Francis Thompson - James Thomson - John Todhunter - Charles Turner - John Leicester Warren - Rosamund Marriott Watson - William Watson - Augusta Webster - Charles Whitehead - Oscar Wilde - James Chapman Woods - William Wordsworth - W. B. Yeats

== Poetry of the Nineties (1970) ==
Edited by R. K. R. Thornton. The poets included were:

Alfred Austin - John Barlas - Aubrey Beardsley - Laurence Binyon - Olive Custance - John Davidson - R. W. Dixon - Lord Alfred Douglas - Ernest Dowson - Michael Field - John Gray - G. A. Greene - Thomas Hardy - W. E. Henley - Herbert Horne - A. E. Housman - Selwyn Image - Lionel Johnson - Rudyard Kipling - Richard Le Gallienne - Eugene Lee-Hamilton - Alice Meynell - Henry Newbolt - Vincent O'Sullivan - Stephen Phillips - Victor Plarr - Dollie Radford - Ernest Radford - Ernest Rhys - Arthur Symons - Francis Thompson - Theodore Wratislaw - W. B. Yeats

== Poetry of the Thirties (1964) ==
Edited by Robin Skelton. The poets included were:

Kenneth Allott - W. H. Auden - George Barker - Julian Bell - John Betjeman - Ronald Bottrall - Norman Cameron - Christopher Caudwell - John Cornford - Hugh Sykes Davies - Clifford Dyment - William Empson - Gavin Ewart - Edgar Foxall - Roy Fuller - David Gascoyne - Geoffrey Grigson - Bernard Gutteridge - Robert Hamer - Rayner Heppenstall - Peter Hewitt - Laurie Lee - John Lehmann - C. Day-Lewis - Louis MacNeice - Charles Madge - H. B. Mallalieu - Philip O'Connor - Clere Parsons - Geoffrey Parsons - F. T. Prince - John Pudney - Henry Reed - Anne Ridler - Michael Roberts - Roger Roughton - Francis Scarfe - John Short - Bernard Spencer - Stephen Spender - Randall Swingler - Julian Symons - Dylan Thomas - Ruthven Todd - Rex Warner - Vernon Watkins

== The Penguin Book of Spanish Civil War Verse (1980) ==
Edited by Valentine Cunningham. The poets and a few writers included were:

Valentine Ackland - Rafael Alberti - Manuel Altolaguirre - W. H. Auden - George Barker - Clive Branson - J. Bronowski - Albert Brown - Roy Campbell - Maurice Carpenter - Christopher Caudwell - Richard Church - Elisabeth Cluer - John Cornford - Nancy Cunard - Charles Donnelly - Eric Edney - A. M. Elliott - Redmayne Fitzgerald - Edgar Foxall - Francis Fuentes - Roy Fuller - R. Gardner - Pedro Garfias - Geoffrey Grigson - Julio D. Guillén - Bernard Gutteridge - Hans Haflin - Charlotte Haldane - J. C. Hall - Bill Harrington - Margot Heinemann - J. F. Hendry - Miguel Hernández - Brian Howard - T. A. R. Hyndman - Luis Perez Infante - W. B. Keal - L. Kendall - H. M. King - A. S. Knowland - Laurie Lee - John Lepper - C. Day-Lewis - Jack Lindsay - F. L. Lucas - Antonio García Luque - Somhairle Macalastair - Hugh MacDiarmid - Donagh MacDonagh - Antonio Machado - Louis MacNeice - H. B. Mallalieu - Ewart Milne - Pablo Neruda - T. E. Nicholas - George Orwell - Aileen Palmer - Felix Paredes - Geoffrey Parsons - Herbert L. Peacock - José Herrera Petere - Plá y Bertran - Kathleen Raine - Herbert Read - Stanley Richardson - Edgell Rickword - J. T. Roderick - Jacques Roumain - Sagittarius - Blanaid Salkeld - Zofia Schleyen - Bernard Spencer - H. G. Sutcliffe - Luis de Tapia - Ruthven Todd - Miles Tomalin - González Tuñón - Lorenzo Varela - José Moreno Villa - Rex Warner - Sylvia Townsend Warner - Tom Wintringham - L. J. Yates

== Poetry of the Forties (1968) ==
Edited by Robin Skelton. The poets included were:

Drummond Allison - Kenneth Allott - Patrick Anderson - W. H. Auden - George Barker - John Bayliss - William Bell - Peter Black - George Bruce - Demetrios Capetanakis - Leonard Clark - Alex Comfort - Dorian Cooke - R. N. Currey - Paul Dehn - Patric Dickinson - Keith Douglas - Lawrence Durrell - D. J. Enright - Robin Fedden - G. S. Fraser - Ernest Frost - Roy Fuller - Roland Gant - Wrey Gardiner - David Gascoyne - W. S. Graham - K. R. Gray - Bernard Gutteridge - Michael Hamburger - John Heath-Stubbs - Alexander Henderson - J. F. Hendry - John Jarmain - Seán Jennett - Sidney Keyes - Francis King - James Kirkup - Christopher Lee - Laurie Lee - Patrick Leigh Fermor - Alun Lewis - C. Day-Lewis - Reg Levy - Robert Liddell - Emanuel Litvinoff - Norman MacCaig - Neil McCallum - Louis MacNeice - Roland Mathias - J. S. Mollison - James Monahan - Jane Moore - Nicholas Moore - Norman Nicholson - Julian Orde - David Paul - Mervyn Peake - F. T. Prince - Kathleen Raine - Henry Reed - Anne Ridler - Iver Roberts-Jones - W. R. Rodgers - Alan Rook - Alan Ross - Vernon Scannell - Francis Scarfe - Lawrie Scarlett - Bernard Spencer - Stephen Spender - Hal Summers - Julian Symons - Dylan Thomas - R. S. Thomas - Frank Thompson - Terence Tiller - Ruthven Todd - Henry Treece - James Walker - Vernon Watkins - Paul Widdows

- The New Poetry (1962, 1966)

== The Mid Century: English Poetry 1940–60 (1965) ==
Edited by David Wright. The poets included were:

Dannie Abse - Drummond Allison - J. C. Ashby - W. H. Auden - George Barker - William Bell - John Betjeman - Thomas Blackburn - Norman Cameron - Roy Campbell - Maurice Carpenter - Charles Causley - Anthony Cronin - Donald Davie - Keith Douglas - Lawrence Durrell - William Empson - Roy Fuller - David Gascoyne - W. S. Graham - Robert Graves - Thom Gunn - Michael Hamburger - John Heath-Stubbs - Brian Higgins - Geoffrey Hill - Ted Hughes - Elizabeth Jennings - Patrick Kavanagh - Sidney Keyes - Philip Larkin - Christopher Logue - Hugh MacDiarmid - Louis MacNeice - Dom Moraes - Edwin Muir - William Plomer - F. T. Prince - Martin Seymour-Smith - C. H. Sisson - Stevie Smith - Dylan Thomas - Anthony Thwaite - Charles Tomlinson - Vernon Watkins

- British Poetry since 1945
- Children of Albion: Poetry of the Underground in Britain
- Penguin Book of Contemporary British Poetry(1982)

== Penguin Book of Contemporary Verse (1918–1960) ==
The Penguin Book of Contemporary Verse is a poetry anthology first published in 1950, and edited by Kenneth Allott, generally restricted to British poets (T. S. Eliot, Sylvia Plath and some Irish poets were included). Its significant and expanded second edition of 1962 contains an engaged Introduction by Allott, showing particular concern to reply to the Movement's argument about the 'Neo-Romantic' style of the 1940s, from the perspective of a dozen more years.

Poets in the Penguin Book of Contemporary Verse, Second Edition

Kenneth Allott - A. Alvarez - Kingsley Amis - W. H. Auden - George Barker - Patricia Beer - William Bell - John Betjeman - Laurence Binyon - Thomas Blackburn - Edmund Blunden - Norman Cameron - Roy Campbell - Robert Conquest - Hilary Corke - Donald Davie - Cecil Day-Lewis - Walter de la Mare - Lawrence Durrell - T. S. Eliot - William Empson - D. J. Enright - Christopher Fry - Roy Fuller - David Gascoyne - W. S. Graham - Robert Graves - Thom Gunn - John Heath-Stubbs - Geoffrey Hill - John Holloway - Ted Hughes - Aldous Huxley - Elizabeth Jennings - James Joyce - Sidney Keyes - Thomas Kinsella - James Kirkup - Philip Larkin - D. H. Lawrence - Laurie Lee - John Lehmann - Peter Levi - Alun Lewis - Wyndham Lewis - Norman MacCaig - Louis MacNeice - Charles Madge - Jon Manchip White - Harold Monro - Edwin Muir - Norman Nicholson - Wilfred Owen - Sylvia Plath - William Plomer - F. T. Prince - Peter Quennell - Kathleen Raine - Herbert Read - Henry Reed - James Reeves - Anne Ridler - Michael Roberts - W. R. Rodgers - Isaac Rosenberg - Siegfried Sassoon - Francis Scarfe - E. J. Scovell - Jon Silkin - Sacheverell Sitwell - Bernard Spencer - Stephen Spender - Dylan Thomas - Edward Thomas - R. S. Thomas - Anthony Thwaite - Terence Tiller - Charles Tomlinson - Henry Treece - John Wain - Arthur Waley - Rex Warner - Vernon Watkins - Charles Williams - W. B. Yeats - Andrew Young

== The Penguin Book of the Sonnet (2001) ==
Edited by Phillis Levin. The poets included were:

Francesco Petrarca - Geoffrey Chaucer - Thomas Wyatt - Henry Howard, Earl of Surrey - Anne Locke - George Gascoigne - Edmund Spenser - Fulke Greville - Philip Sidney - Walter Ralegh - George Chapman - Henry Constable - Mark Alexander Boyd - Samuel Daniel - Michael Drayton - John Davies of Hereford - Charles Best - William Shakespeare - John Davies - John Donne - Ben Jonson - Lord Herbert of Cherbury - William Drummond of Hawthornden - Mary Wroth - Robert Herrick - George Herbert - John Milton - Charles Cotton - Thomas Gray - Charlotte Turner Smith - William Blake - Robert Burns - William Wordsworth - Samuel Taylor Coleridge - Robert Southey - Mary F. Johnson - Leigh Hunt - George Gordon, Lord Byron - Percy Bysshe Shelley - John Clare - John Keats - Hartley Coleridge - Thomas Lovell Beddoes - Elizabeth Barrett Browning - Henry Wadsworth Longfellow - Charles Tennyson Turner - Edgar Allan Poe - Alfred, Lord Tennyson - Robert Browning - Aubrey Thomas de Vere - George Eliot - Frederick Goddard Tuckerman - Matthew Arnold - George Meredith - Dante Gabriel Rossetti - Christina Rossetti - Algernon Charles Swinburne - Thomas Hardy - Robert Bridges - Gerard Manley Hopkins - Emma Lazarus - Oscar Wilde - W. B. Yeats - Ernest Dowson - Edwin Arlington Robinson - Trumbull Stickney - Rupert Brooke - Alice Dunbar-Nelson - Robert Frost - Edward Thomas - Ezra Pound - Elinor Wylie - Siegfried Sassoon - Robinson Jeffers - Marianne Moore - Edwin Muir - T. S. Eliot - John Crowe Ransom - Claude McKay - Archibald MacLeish - Edna St. Vincent Millay - Wilfred Owen - Dorothy Parker - E. E. Cummings - Jean Toomer - Robert Graves - Edmund Blunden - Louise Bogan - Hart Crane - Roy Campbell - Countee Cullen - Patrick Kavanagh - W. H. Auden - Louis MacNeice - Malcolm Lowry - Stephen Spender - Elizabeth Bishop - George Barker - Robert Hayden - John Berryman - Weldon Kees - Dylan Thomas - Margaret Walker - Gwendolyn Brooks - Charles Causley - Robert Lowell - William Meredith - Amy Clampitt - Howard Nemerov - Hayden Carruth - Marie Ponsot - Richard Wilbur - Philip Larkin - Anthony Hecht - Jane Cooper - Donald Justice - James K. Baxter - James Merrill - John Ashbery - W. S. Merwin - James Wright - Donald Hall - Thom Gunn - John Hollander - Adrienne Rich - Derek Walcott - Geoffrey Hill - Sylvia Plath - John Updike - Jean Valentine - Robert Mezey - Grace Schulman - Charles Wright - June Jordan - Judith Rodriguez - Frederick Seidel - John Fuller - Tony Harrison - Les Murray - Charles Simic - Frank Bidart - Seamus Heaney - Stanley Plumly - Billy Collins - Douglas Dunn - Marilyn Hacker - David Huddle - Charles Martin - William Matthews - Louise Glück - Ellen Bryant Voigt - Eavan Boland - J. D. McClatchy - Leon Stokesbury - Star Black - Marilyn Nelson - Bruce Smith - Molly Peacock - Hugh Seidman - Rachel Hadas - Denis Johnson - Sherod Santos - Julia Alvarez - Dana Gioia - Medbh McGuckian - Paul Muldoon - Rita Dove - Mark Jarman - Elizabeth Macklin - Tom Sleigh - Rosanna Warren - David Baker - Phillis Levin - John Burnside - Carol Ann Duffy - Robin Robertson - Karl Kirchwey - Deborah Laser - Jacqueline Osherow - James Lasdun - Kate Light - Joe Bolton - Rafael Campo - Mike Nelson - Daniel Gutstein - Beth Ann Fennelly - Jason Schneiderman

== The Penguin Book of Irish Verse (1970, 2nd Edition 1981) ==
Edited by Brendan Kennelly. The poets included were:

Frank O'Connor - Charles Wolfe - Jeremiah Joseph Callanan - George Darley -- Eugene O'Curry - James Clarence Mangan - Gerald Griffin - Francis Sylvester Mahony - Edward Walsh - George Fox - Samuel Ferguson - Aubrey de Vere - Thomas Davis - William McBurney - Arthur G. Geoghegan - Lady Wilde - John Kells Ingram - Michael Joseph McCann - Thomas Caulfield Irwin - William Allingham - Thomas D'Arcy McGee - John Todhunter - Edward Dowden - John Boyle O'Reilly - Arthur O'Shaughnessy - Emily Lawless - Alfred Perceval Graves - William Larminie - John Keegan Casey - Fanny Parnell - Oscar Wilde - T. W. Rolleston - John Synge - Thomas MacDonagh - Patrick Pearse - Joseph Plunkett - Francis Ledwidge - W. B. Yeats - George William Russell - Oliver St. John Gogarty - Joseph Campbell - Seumas O'Sullivan - Padraic Colum - James Joyce - James Stephens - Austin Clarke - Monk Gibbon - F.R. Higgins - R. N. D. Wilson - Patrick MacDonogh - Ewart Milne - C. Day-Lewis - Padraic Fallon - Bryan Guinness - Patrick Kavanagh - Samuel Beckett - John Hewitt - Louis MacNeice - Denis Devlin - Robert Farren - W. R. Rodgers - W. B. Stanford - Donagh MacDonagh - Sigerson Clifford - Valentin Iremonger - Kevin Faller - Roy McFadden - Padraic Fiacc - Anthony Cronin - Jerome Kiely - Eugene R. Watters - Pearse Hutchinson - Richard Kell - Richard Murphy - John B. Keane - Ulick O'Connor - Basil Payne - Thomas Kinsella - John Montague - Patrick Galvin - Seán Lucy - Richard Weber - Sean O'Meara - James Simmons - James Liddy - Rivers Carew - James McAuley - Desmond O'Grady - Brendan Kennelly - Rudi Holzapfel - Seamus Heaney - Michael Longley - Seamus Deane - Timothy Brownlow - Michael Hartnett - Derek Mahon - Eilean Ni Chuilleanain - John F. Deane - John Ennis - Paul Durcan - Eavan Boland - Hayden Murphy - Tom McGurk - Richard Ryan - Hugh Maxton - Frank Ormsby - Peter Fallon - Paul Muldoon - Thomas McCarthy - Aidan Carl Mathews.
