= Oxford Book of Irish Verse =

The Oxford Book of Irish Verse; XVIIth century - XXth century was a poetry anthology edited by Donagh MacDonagh and Lennox Robinson. It was published "at the Clarendon Press, Oxford" (Oxford University Press) in 1958 (xxxviii, 343 p.).

A new compilation, the New Oxford Book of Irish Verse, edited by Thomas Kinsella, was published in 1986.

== Poets included in The Oxford Book of Irish Verse ==
Luke Wadding - Nahum Tate - Jonathan Swift - Oliver Goldsmith - John O'Keeffe - Richard Brinsley Sheridan - William Drennan - Richard Alfred Milliken - Thomas Moore - Eaton Stannard Barrett - Charles Wolfe - George Darley - J. J. Callanan - Eugene O'Curry - James Clarence Mangan - George Fox - Edward Fitzgerald - Samuel Ferguson - Thomas Davis - Emily Brontë - Frances Alexander - John Kells Ingram - William Allingham - Thomas D'arcy McGee - George Sigerson - John Todhunter - Edward Dowden - Arthur O'Shaughnessy - Hon. Emily Lawless - William Larminie - Augusta Gregory - Fanny Parnell - Oscar Wilde - Percy French - Thomas William Rolleston - Kuno Meyer - Eleanor Hull - Katharine Tynan - Francis Carlin - Douglas Hyde - W. B. Yeats - Herbert Trench - Philip Francis Little - Dora Sigerson Shorter - Ethna Carbery - Æ (George William Russell) - Thomas Boyd - Nora Hopper - John Millington Synge - James H. Cousins - Thomas MacDonagh - Lord Dunsany - Oliver St. John Gogarty - Seumas O'Sullivan - Padraic Pearse - Joseph Campbell - Alice Milligan - Blanaid Salkeld - Robin Flower - James Joyce - Padraic Colum - James Stephens - 'Dermot O'Byrne' (Arnold Bax) - Francis MacNamara - Joseph Plunkett - Patrick Browne - - Helen Waddell - Brinsley MacNamara - Geoffrey Taylor - Francis Ledwidge - Mary Davenport O'Neill - Thomas MacGreevy - Austin Clarke - Monk Gibbon - R. N. D. Wilson - Eileen Shanahan - Patrick MacDonogh - Earl of Longford - John Lyle Donaghy - Rhoda Coghill - Frank O'Connor - Patrick Kavanagh - C. Day-Lewis - Bryan Guinness - Sheila Wingfield - Padraic Fallon - Louis MacNeice -Denis Devlin - Francis MacManus - W. R. Rodgers - Robert Farren - Brian O'Nolan - Donagh MacDonagh - Leslie Daiken - Niall Sheridan - Valentin Iremonger - Máire MacEntee - Roy McFadden - Thomas Kinsella
