= Callanan =

Callanan is an Irish surname. Notable people with the surname include:

- Aonghus Callanan (born 1985), Irish sportsman
- Colm Callanan (born 1982), Irish sportsperson
- Fionnbar Callanan, Irish sports photographer
- Ian Callanan (born 1971), Irish composer
- James J. Callanan (1842–1900), businessman and politician
- James Joseph Callanan (1795–1829), Irish poet
- Jeremiah Joseph Callanan (1795–1829), Irish poet
- Joe Callanan (born 1949), Irish politician
- John Joe Callanan (1894–1970), Irish sportsperson
- Johnny Callanan (1910–1982), Irish politician
- Liam Callanan, American author and professor of English
- Martin Callanan (born 1961), British politician
- Martin John Callanan (born 1982), artist
- Michael Callanan (1849–1929), politician
- Peter Callanan (1935–2009), Irish politician
- Séamus Callanan (born 1988), hurler

== See also ==
- Callinan
