= Faber Book of Irish Verse =

1974 poetry anthology

- Author: John Montague
- Language: English
- Genre: Anthology
- Publisher: Faber and Faber
- Publication date: 1974
- Publication place: United Kingdom
- Media type: Print
- ISBN: 0-571-08393-5
- OCLC: 945569
- Dewey Decimal: 821
- LC Class: PR8851 .M6

The Faber Book of Irish Verse was a poetry anthology edited by John Montague and first published in 1974 by Faber and Faber. Recognised as an important collection, it has been described as 'the only general anthology of Irish verse in the past 30 years that has a claim to be a work of art in itself ... still the freshest introduction to the full range of Irish poetry'. According to Montague, "I'm dealing with a thousand years of Irish verse in under four hundred pages. I needed a thousand pages.'

== Poets in the Faber Book of Irish Verse ==
This list includes translators, as well as the original poets; some come under both categories.

Æ - William Allingham - Samuel Beckett - Brendan Behan - Eavan Boland - Jeremiah Joseph Callanan - Joseph Campbell - James Carney - Ciaran Carson - Austin Clarke - Brian Coffey - Colmán - Colmcille - Padraic Colum - Maurice James Craig - Anthony Cronin - George Darley - Seamus Deane - Aubrey De Vere - Denis Devlin - Eilís Dillon - John Lyle Donaghy - Charles Donnelly - John Swanwick Drennan - Padraic Fallon - Samuel Ferguson - Piaras Feiritéar - Gerald Fitzgerald, Earl of Desmond - Robin Flower - George Fox - Oliver St. John Gogarty - Oliver Goldsmith - Alfred Perceval Graves - Robert Graves - Michael Hartnett - George Campbell Hay - Seamus Heaney - John Hewitt - F. R. Higgins - Pearse Hutchinson - Douglas Hyde - Valentin Iremonger - Thomas Caulfield Irwin - Robinson Jeffers - James Joyce - Patrick Kavanagh - Geoffrey Keating - Joan Keefe - John V. Kelleher - Brendan Kennelly - Thomas Kinsella - William Larminie - Francis Ledwidge - Earl of Longford - Michael Longley - Seán Lucy - Donagh MacDonagh - Thomas MacDonagh - Patrick MacDonogh - Cathal Buí Mac Giolla Ghunna - Hugh MacGowran - Thomas MacGreevy - Thomas MacIntyre - Niall Mór Mac Muireadach - Aindrais MacMarcuis - Giolla Brighde MacNamee - Louis MacNeice - Owen Roe MacWard - Derek Mahon - James Clarence Mangan - David Marcus - Hugh Maxton - Vivian Mercier - Brian Merriman - Kuno Meyer - Ewart Milne - John Montague - Thomas Moore - Michael Moran - Thomas Mozeen - Paul Muldoon - Richard Murphy - Paul Murray - Eiléan Ní Chuilleanáin - Flann O'Brien - Máire Mhac an tSaoi - Dáibhí Ó Bruadair - Turlough O'Carolan - Eibhlin Dubh O'Connell - Frank O'Connor - Eugene O'Curry - Gofraidh Fionn Ó Dálaigh - Muireadach O'Dalaigh - Gregory O'Donoghue - Feargal Óg MacWard - Desmond O'Grady - Mahon O'Heffernan - Tadhg Dall O'Huiginn - Eochaidh O'Hussey - Aogán Ó Rathaille - Seán Ó Riada - Owen Roe O'Sullivan - Seumas O'Sullivan - Antoine Ó Raifteirí - George Reavey - W. R. Rodgers - George William Russell - Richard Ryan - Sedulius Scottus - James Simmons - Robin Skelton - Richard Stanyhurst - James Stephens - Jonathan Swift - John Millington Synge - Samuel Thompson - Arland Ussher - Helen Waddell - Edward Walsh - J. F. Webb - Richard Weber - Charles Wilson - R. N. D. Wilson - W. B. Yeats - Augustus Young.

== See also ==
- 1974 in poetry
- 1974 in literature
- English poetry
- List of poetry anthologies
