= Geoffrey Parsons =

Geoffrey Parsons may refer to:

- Geoffrey Parsons (lyricist) (1910–1987), British lyricist
- Geoffrey Parsons (pianist) (1929–1995), Australian classical pianist
- Geoff Parsons (athlete) (born 1964), Scottish high jumper
- Geoffrey Parsons (newspaperman), newspaper writer, see Pulitzer Prize for Editorial Writing
- Geoffrey Parsons (poet), see Penguin poetry anthologies
