= Foxall =

Foxall is a surname. Notable people with the surname include:

- Damian Foxall (born 1969), Irish sailor
- Edgar Foxall (1900–1990), English poet
- Frank Foxall (born 1884), English footballer
- Fred Foxall (1898–1926), English footballer
- Henry Foxall (1758–1823), American politician, industrialist and preacher
- Stan Foxall (1914–1991), English footballer
