= Hurrish =

Novel by Emily Lawless

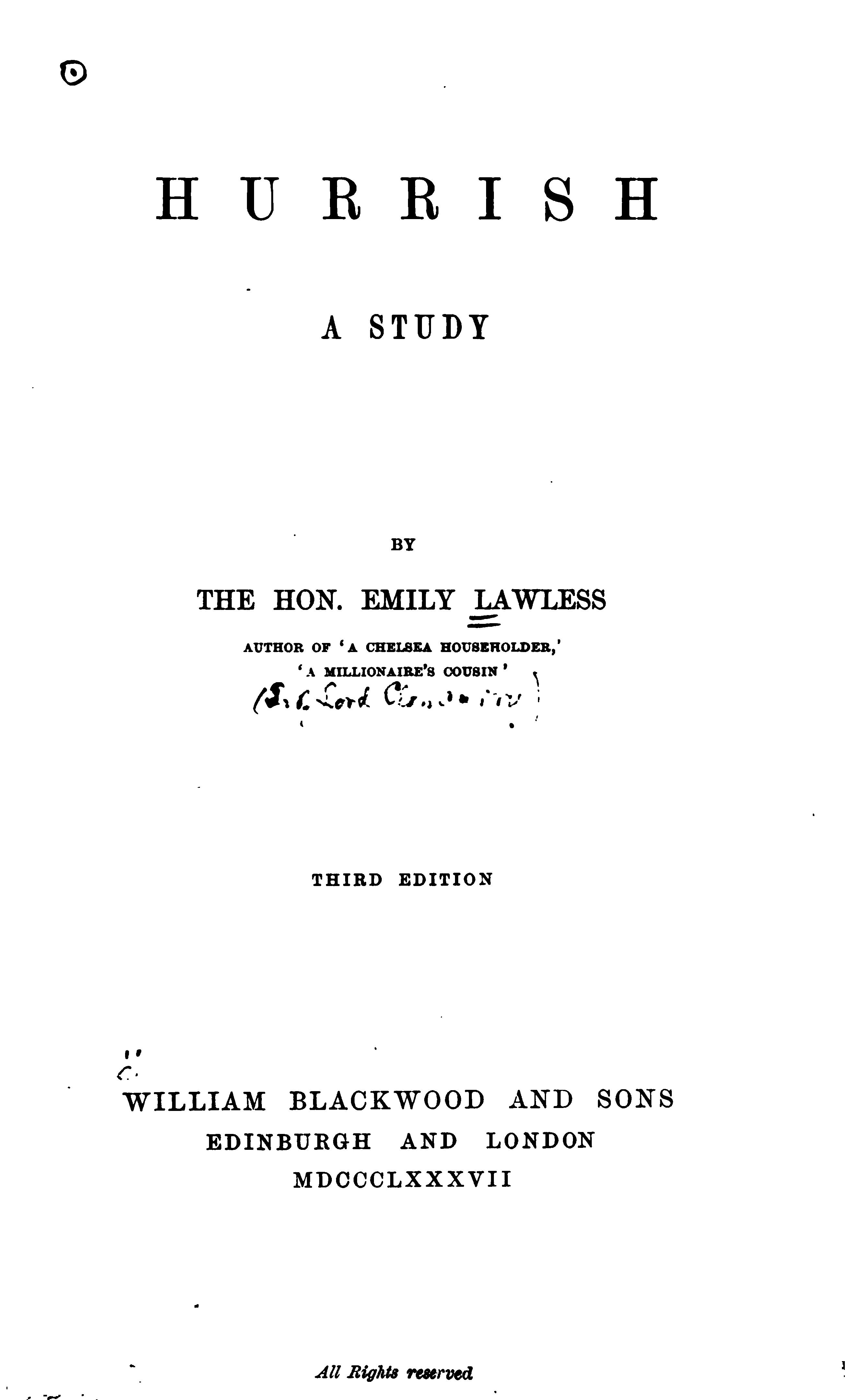
- Title page of the third edition, 1887
- Author: Emily Lawless
- Published: 1886

Hurrish: A Study is a novel by Emily Lawless, published in 1886.

== Plot ==
The scene is laid in County Clare during the Land War. Horatio, or Hurrish O'Brien, the big, kindly, simple farmer, gives poor, pretty Ally a home, and is a father to weak, vain Maurice Brady; but he becomes the victim of fate. His fierce old mother is an ardent patriot. They live in the midst of Fenians, but he will not strike a blow for rebellion. Maurice Brady’s brutish brother Mat, hated by all, shoots at Hurrish from his hiding-place; Hurrish strikes one blow in self-defence, kills him, and is betrayed to the police by Maurice. Hurrish is tried and acquitted, but Maurice murders him in spite of Ally's warnings. Ally, though betrothed to Maurice, loves Hurrish without knowing it. Hurrish, in his devotion to Maurice, acquits him on his death-bed. Ally becomes a nun; Maurice goes to America, where he makes a fortune, but is shunned by his countrymen as an informer and a traitor. Hurrish's memory is cherished in his native village.

== Appraisal ==
Helen Rex Keller writes, "This is a picture of life on the west coast of Ireland, wild and sad as is that barren iron land itself. … This [is a] capital picture of Irish character, with all its weaknesses, inconsistencies, and superstitions".

== Sources ==
- Welch, Robert (2000). "Hurrish: A Study". In The Concise Oxford Companion to Irish Literature. Oxford University Press. Retrieved 22 October 2022.

Attribution:

- Keller, Helen Rex (1924). "Hurrish". In The Reader's Digest of Books. The Library of the World's Best Literature. New York: The Macmillan Company. pp. 415–416.
