= John Donaghy =

John Donaghy may refer to:

- John Donaghy (football manager), English football manager
- John Lyle Donaghy, Irish poet
- John Patrick Donaghy, Irish politician and physician
- Jack Donaghy (John Francis Donaghy), a fictional character on the TV series 30 Rock
