= Stanza =

Group of lines within a poem

In poetry, a stanza (/ˈstænzə/; from Italian stanza, Italian: [ˈstantsa]; lit. 'room') is a group of lines within a poem, usually set off from others by a blank line or indentation. Stanzas can have regular rhyme and metrical schemes, but they are not required to have either. There are many different forms of stanzas. Some stanzaic forms are simple, such as four-line quatrains. Other forms are more complex, such as the Spenserian stanza. Fixed verse poems, such as sestinas, can be defined by the number and form of their stanzas.

The stanza has also been known by terms such as batch, fit, and stave.

The term stanza has a similar meaning to strophe, though strophe sometimes refers to an irregular set of lines, as opposed to regular, rhymed stanzas.

Even though the term "stanza" is taken from Italian, in the Italian language the word "strofa" is more commonly used.

In music, groups of lines are typically referred to as verses. The stanza in poetry is analogous with the paragraph in prose: related thoughts are grouped into units.

== Example 1 ==
This short poem by Emily Dickinson has two stanzas of four lines each:

I had no time to hate, because
The grave would hinder me,
And life was not so ample I
Could finish enmity.

Nor had I time to love; but since
Some industry must be,
The little toil of love, I thought,
was large enough for me.

== Example 2 ==
This poem by Andrew John Young has three stanzas of six lines each:

Frost called to the water Halt
And crusted the moist snow with sparkling salt;
Brooks, their one bridges, stop,
And icicles in long stalactites drop.
And tench in water-holes
Lurk under gluey glass-like fish in bowls.

In the hard-rutted lane
At every footstep breaks a brittle pane,
And tinkling trees ice-bound,
Changed into weeping willows, sweep the ground;
Dead boughs take root in ponds
And ferns on windows shoot their ghostly fronds.

But vainly the fierce frost
Interns poor fish, ranks trees in an armed host,
Hangs daggers from house-eaves
And on the windows ferny am bush weaves;
In the long war grown warmer
The sun will strike him dead and strip his armour.
