= James Callanan =

James Callanan may refer to:

- James J. Callanan (1842–1900), cooper, merchant and political figure in Newfoundland
- James Joseph Callanan (1795–1829), Irish poet
