= Aindrais MacMarcuis =

Irish poet (fl. ca. 1608)

Aindrais MacMarcuis was an Irish poet; he flourished c. 1608.

MacMarcuis is mainly known for This Night Sees Ireland Desolate, a lament concerning the Flight of the Earls. John Montague published a version of it in the Faber Book of Irish Verse in 1974.
