= University of London Institute in Paris =

British university institute

Coordinates: 48.8601°N 2.3151°E

- Type: Public
- Established: 1894; 132 years ago
- Parent institution: University of London
- Chancellor: Anne, Princess Royal
- Students: 200
- Undergraduates: 120
- Postgraduates: 80
- Location: Paris, France
Colours
- Website: ulip.london.ac.uk

The University of London Institute in Paris (ULIP; French: Institut de l'Université de Londres à Paris) is a central academic body of the University of London located in the 7th arrondissement of Paris. It is the only British university institute in continental Europe.

== History ==
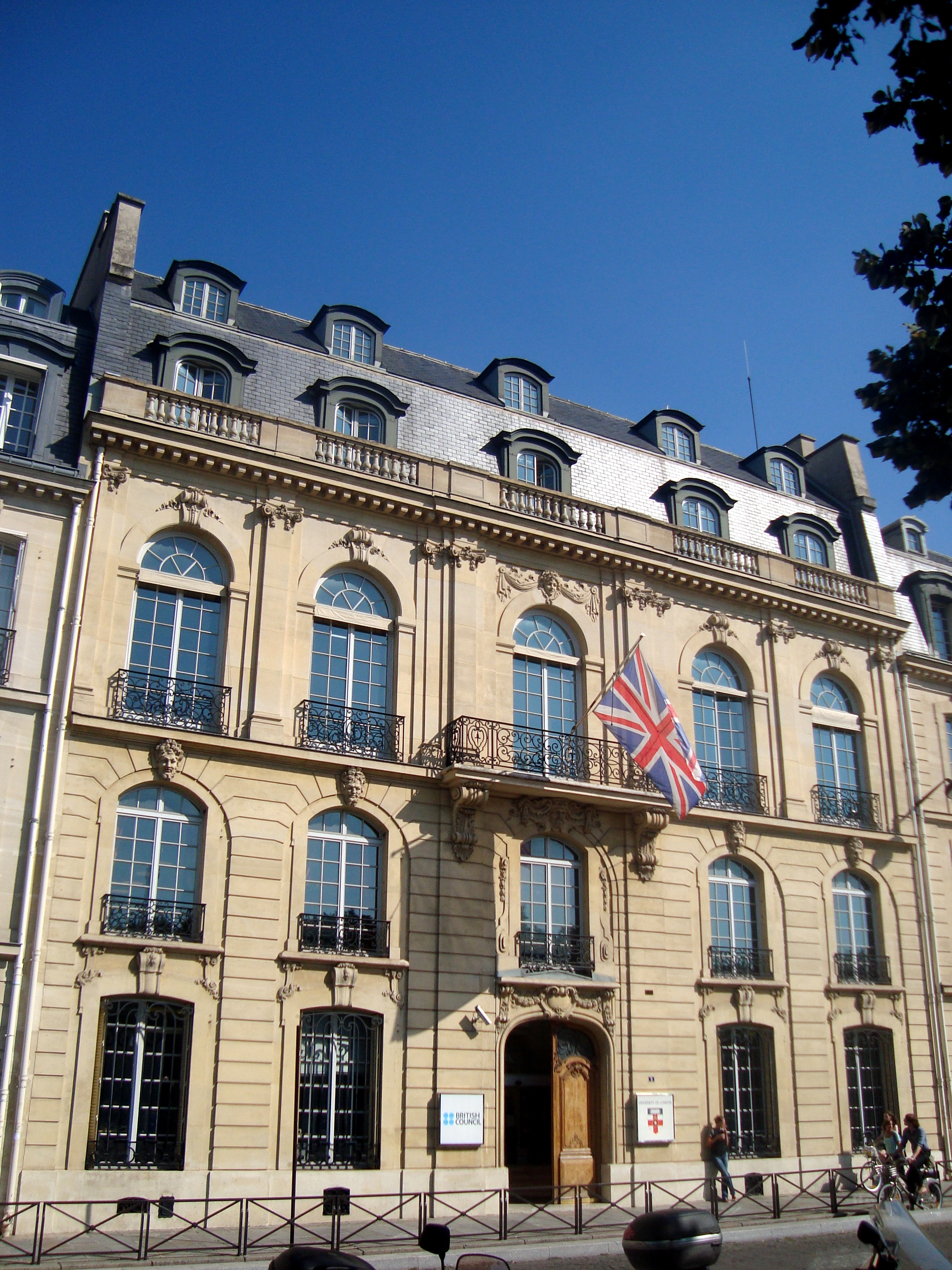
The University of London Institute in Paris is located on the Esplanade des Invalides in central Paris

The institute was established by an English woman, Edith Williams, in 1894, with the support of the then British ambassador, Lord Dufferin. It was originally known as the "Franco-British Guild", which from 1894 offered classes in conversational English to French students soon to qualify as teachers of English through more theoretical studies. In 1900, French classes were added, aimed at British students spending time in Paris, and thus a unique Franco-British community was created. In the same year, the guild established itself in the rue de la Sorbonne, opposite the University of Paris.

After the First World War the French and British governments, concerned by the lack of a common language between the British and French armies that had become apparent during hostilities, sought means of improving cultural and linguistic links between their countries. The French government founded an Institut français du Royaume-Uni in London (South Kensington), while another British ambassador to France, Lord Crewe, launched a fund for the creation of a British Institute in Paris. This was to consist of a bi-cultural teaching establishment (the guild, reorganised and expanded) and a Franco-British student hostel in the international Cité Universitaire, which was eventually opened in 1937 under the name Collège Franco-Britannique. As part of the new British Institute in Paris, the guild received the support of a number of British universities, including the University of London, as well as forming an integral part of the University of Paris. In addition to facilities for teaching, a library and clubroom were added to the guild's premises at this time and prominent French and British academics and intellectuals were invited to give lectures.

The British Institute left its Sorbonne link to become incorporated into the University of London in 1969.

The British Institute was renamed the University of London Institute in Paris in 2005. The institute worked closely with Queen Mary University of London and Royal Holloway, University of London, who were members of a consortium established with the Central University in 2004 to create mutual benefits in a number of areas of academic and support activity. From September 2016, Queen Mary University of London took over the functions provided by Royal Holloway and all students are now considered registered students of Queen Mary University of London.

Although the institute began life teaching oral English to the French, it was soon improving the oral French of visiting British students; currently the institute's teaching centres around its BA courses in French studies, complemented by a growing portfolio of undergraduate and postgraduate courses in international relations, urban studies, business, and law. The English language programme has been discontinued – classes are now provided by the British Council – as ULIP has looked to develop itself as a research-led institute.

Today ULIP shares its building with the British Council, which The Independent newspaper has described as a "lovely, traditional Paris building, in a great location overlooking the Esplanade des Invalides". Its strength is that because it is a relatively small institution it can offer a more intimate learning experience than is available in a larger, more anonymous University. It has the unique advantage of allowing students to study French culture and language in the country itself whilst still offering the student support and quality assurance of a British educational institution. The quality of its degrees is ratified either by the University of London, or by Queen Mary University of London, depending on the programme studied. As a result of these advantages the entrance requirements for students are relatively high (AAB or ABB at A level (or equivalent) for undergraduate programmes and a 2:1 (or equivalent) for postgraduate programmes). 76% of its undergraduate students are women, 24% men; 65% of its postgraduate students are women and 35% are men.

== Academics ==
The institute offers two three-year undergraduate courses: a BA in French Studies, which can be combined with minors in History, Business, or International Relations. And a BA in International Politics (taught in English), which can be studied with a minor in French Studies. Both courses offered result in a University of London qualification.

At postgraduate level the institute offers a Master of Arts in Urban History and Culture and a Master of Laws. Both postgraduate courses are taught in collaboration with Queen Mary University of London: the MA in Urban History and Culture receives a University of London degree. The Master of Laws is taught and awarded by Queen Mary University of London and can be taken either as a single degree lasting 12 months, or as a dual degree, with the Sorbonne, lasting 18 months.

The institute hosts a large number of academic seminars, workshops and conferences that bring together leading British and French scholars and scientists in a range of academic subjects. It is also home to the Paris Centre for Migrant Writing and Expression – a research centre working with academics, students, asylum seekers and refugees in Paris to investigate varied questions of mobility and displacement, translation, multilingualism, and cultural transfer.

== Student life ==
The University of London Institute in Paris offers a range of opportunities designed to enrich students’ academic and social experience in the heart of Paris. The institute promotes a supportive environment, with practical services such as careers advice, help with accommodation and student support services available to enrolled students.

=== Students' Union ===
University of London Institute in Paris Students' Union (ULIP SU) is the representative body for students of the institute. All ULIP students automatically become its members free of charge and are encouraged to get involved beyond the classroom through a wide range of events, societies, and student-led initiatives, including social events, guest lectures, and group activities.

The Union is entirely student-run and student-elected, with representatives chosen annually to sit on the Students’ Union Executive Committee, ensuring fair and inclusive representation of the student body. All ULIP students can join or create societies covering areas such as sport, arts, culture, politics, student media, and beyond, making it easy to build communities around shared interests and ideas.

In the 2025–2026 academic year, the President of the ULIP Students’ Union is Marina Argent, who represents the student body and oversees the Union's activities.

== Notable people ==
Former directors include Francis Scarfe (1959–78), Harley Granville Barker (1937–39), and Andrew Hussey (2008–14).

Former students include the artist Françoise Gilot, who was Picasso's partner between 1944 and 1953 and author of the bestselling Life with Picasso, the BBC newsreader Fiona Bruce, and Queen Camilla.
