= Hilary Corke =

English writer, composer and mineralogist

Hilary Topham Corke (12 July 1921 – 3 September 2001) was an English writer, composer and mineralogist.

Corke was born in Malvern, Worcestershire. He served in the Royal Artillery during World War II.

His poems appeared in Poetry Now (1956) and Penguin Book of Contemporary Verse (1962 edition). Together with Anthony Thwaite and William Plomer he edited New Poems 1961: A P.E.N Anthology of Contemporary Poetry. He died at Abinger Hammer, Surrey, aged 80.
