= Eileen Shanahan =

Irish poet

Eileen Shanahan in Dublin in the later 1920s

Eileen Shanahan (28 October 1901 – 28 January 1979) was an Irish poet. Her best-known poem, The Three Children (Near Clonmel), has been republished five times since its original publication in The Atlantic Monthly in 1929, and was included in the Oxford Book of Irish Verse (1958).

== Biography ==
She was born in Dublin, where her father George Shanahan (1856–1944) was Assistant Secretary of the Irish Board of Works, 1895–1921 and Honorary Treasurer of the Statistical and Social Inquiry Society of Ireland, 1925–44. Her maternal grandfather was J. J. Clancy, Irish Nationalist MP for North County Dublin from 1885 to 1918. Via her maternal grandmother Margaret Hickie, she was related to the revolutionary, poet and author Piaras Béaslaí. She was educated at St Catherine's Dominican Convent, Sion Hill, Blackrock, Dublin and at Alexandra College. She worked as a secretary in Dublin and from 1929 at the League of Nations in Geneva. She married a Scot, Richard Webster, in 1936 and had five children. When France was invaded in 1940 she moved with her family to Dún Laoghaire, Ireland and then to Wallington, Surrey in England, where she lived for the rest of her life.

Her most productive period as a poet was the later 1920s. She first achieved significant publication with four of her poems in The Atlantic Monthly (Boston, USA) during 1929. Her poetry was highly regarded by Lord Dunsany (1878–1957), who helped her to gain publication of The Three Children and Shankill in The London Mercury. Some of her then unpublished poems were broadcast by the Dublin radio station 2RN on 31 May 1930. She also wrote a nativity play The Inn at Bethlehem, related in theme to her poem Epiphany, which was performed at the Theatre Royal, Dublin on 2 December 1928 and broadcast by Radio Eireann on Christmas Eve 1944.

The themes of her poetry include birth and childhood, the trials of love, the contrasts of passionate and cautious approaches to life, and Ireland and its predicament. Many have a powerful sense of place, several, including The Three Children and Moon and Swan, being inspired by visits to her Hickie relatives at Clonmel, Co. Tipperary and another, Shankill, by the countryside near her childhood home at Dalkey. She herself admired the poetry of F. R. Higgins and Francis Ledwidge.

Although she wrote around 70 poems, only eleven were published in her lifetime, and fourteen have been published to date.

== Published poems ==
- The Cherry Tree in Spring – Clonmel Nationalist, 26 March 1921, p. 8
- The Three Children (Near Clonmel) – The Atlantic Monthly (Boston, Mass.), Vol.143, May 1929, p. 624; The London Mercury, Vol.23 No.138, April 1931, pp. 528–9; Goodbye, Twilight, 1936, pp. 62–3; 1000 Years of Irish Poetry, New York, 1947, pp. 716–7; The Oxford Book of Irish Verse, 1958, pp. 245–6; Poetry by Women in Ireland: A Critical Anthology 1870–1970, Liverpool, 2012, pp. 196–7 (only the second, third, fourth and last of these have the authoritative text)
- The Desolate Lover – The Atlantic Monthly (Boston, Mass.), Vol.143, June 1929, pp. 795–6; New Irish Poets, New York, 1948, p. 173; Poetry by Women in Ireland: A Critical Anthology 1870–1970, Liverpool, 2012, pp. 195–6
- Judas in Purgatory – The Atlantic Monthly (Boston, Mass.), Vol.144, September 1929, pp. 340–1 (only the two lyrics extracted from a longer poem were printed)
- To Adventurers (in Romance) – The Observer (London), 30 March 1930; Poetry by Women in Ireland: A Critical Anthology 1870–1970, Liverpool, 2012, pp. 197–8
- Shankill – The London Mercury, Vol.23 No.136, February 1931, p. 315-6; New Irish Poets, New York, 1948, p. 174
- Moon and Swan – The Commonweal (New York), Vol.14, 17 June 1931, p. 184; Irish Times, Saturday 18 May 1935
- The Kilkenny Boy – Irish Times, Saturday 18 May 1935; New Irish Poets, New York, 1948, p. 175
- Pastorale, 1946 – Irish Times, Saturday 11 January 1947; Earth Voices Whispering, Belfast, 2008, p. 113; Poetry by Women in Ireland: A Critical Anthology 1870–1970, Liverpool, 2012, p. 199
- Epiphany – New Irish Poets, New York, 1948, p. 176
- Free State (1925) – Earth Voices Whispering, Belfast, 2008, p. 113; Poetry by Women in Ireland: A Critical Anthology 1870–1970, Liverpool, 2012, p. 196
- September – Route de Malagnou – Poetry by Women in Ireland: A Critical Anthology 1870–1970, Liverpool, 2012, p. 198
- The Colonel's Wife – Poetry by Women in Ireland: A Critical Anthology 1870–1970, Liverpool, 2012, p. 199

== Sources ==
- Sunday Independent (Dublin), 2 December 1928, 25 May 1930 and 24 December 1944
- Irish Times, 31 May 1930
- Obituary, George E. Shanahan, Journal of the Statistical and Social Inquiry Society of Ireland Vol.XVII, 98th Session 1944–45, p.viii
- Piaras Béaslaí Papers, National Library of Ireland
- Collins, Lucy (ed.) (2012) Poetry by Women in Ireland: A Critical Anthology 1870–1970, Liverpool, Liverpool University Press
- Daiken, Leslie H. (compiler) (1936) Goodbye, Twilight: Songs of the Struggle in Ireland, London, Lawrence and Wishart
- Dawe, Gerald (ed.) (2008) Earth Voices Whispering: An Anthology of Irish War Poetry 1914–1945, Belfast, The Blackstaff Press
- Garrity, Devin A. (ed.) (1948) New Irish Poets: Representative Selections from the Work of 37 Contemporaries, New York, The Devin-Adair Company
- Hoagland, Kathleen (ed.) (1947) 1000 Years of Irish Poetry, New York, The Devin-Adair Company
- The Oxford Book of Irish Verse, XVIIth Century-XXth Century, Chosen by Donagh MacDonagh and Lennox Robinson (1958), Oxford University Press
