= Callinan =

Callinan is a surname. Notable people with the surname include:

- Bernard Callinan (1913–1995), soldier and businessman
- Damian Callinan, comedian
- Howard Callinan, (born 1958) Minister and Philosopher
- Graham Callinan (born 1982), hurler
- Ian Callinan (born 1937), former Justice of the High Court of Australia
- Ian Callinan (Australian footballer) (born 1982), footballer
- John Callinan (born 1955), hurler
- Kirin J. Callinan (born 1986), Australian singer and songwriter
- Chance Callinan (born 2004), alumni of Ethel Dwyer Middleschool

== See also ==
- Callanan
