= Top Secret! =

1984 film directed by Jim Abrahams, David Zucker, and Jerry Zucker

- Theatrical release poster
- Directed by: Jim Abrahams; David Zucker; Jerry Zucker
- Written by: Jim Abrahams; David Zucker; Jerry Zucker; Martyn Burke
- Produced by: Jon Davison; Hunt Lowry
- Starring: Val Kilmer; Lucy Gutteridge
- Cinematography: Christopher Challis
- Edited by: Françoise Bonnot; Bernard Gribble
- Music by: Maurice Jarre
- Production company: Kingsmere Properties
- Distributed by: Paramount Pictures
- Release dates: June 22, 1984 (United States); October 5, 1984 (United Kingdom)
- Running time: 90 minutes
- Countries: United States; United Kingdom
- Languages: English; German; Yiddish; Latin; French
- Budget: $8.5–9 million
- Box office: $20.5 million

Top Secret! is a 1984 action comedy film written and directed by Jim Abrahams, David Zucker, and Jerry Zucker (ZAZ) and Martyn Burke. It stars Val Kilmer in his film debut and Lucy Gutteridge alongside a supporting cast including: Omar Sharif, Peter Cushing, Michael Gough and Jeremy Kemp. The film parodies various film styles, such as musicals starring Elvis Presley, spy films of the Cold War era and World War II films. The original music score was composed by Maurice Jarre.

== Plot ==
Nick Rivers, an American rock star, travels to East Germany to perform at a cultural festival, which secretly serves the East German government as a diversion for a military operation with the intent of reuniting Germany under Communist rule. At a dinner, Nick encounters Hillary Flammond, a member of the local resistance movement who is attempting to avoid the authorities. He pretends to be her date to get to know her, and performs an impromptu song and dance, mistakenly thinking he was asked to do so, to the delight of Hillary and the diners, but to the annoyance of General Streck, the mastermind of the "reunification" plot.

Nick later sees Hillary at a ballet, where she expects to rendezvous with the resistance leader, but is met by the police instead. Nick saves her and they try to escape, but Nick turns himself in so that Hillary can get away. He is taken to a prison where he is questioned and tortured, but he knows nothing and does not break. In an escape attempt, he ends up in the secret prison laboratory of Dr. Paul Flammond, a brilliant scientist developing the "Polaris naval mine", a device that can destroy the entire NATO submarine fleet as part of the government's plot. The East Germans force him to work by threatening to kill his daughter, Hillary. Nick is recaptured and scheduled for execution.

The East Germans decide that Nick must perform to avoid an international incident, and he does so to the joy of local girls. He is rescued by Hillary at the end of his performance, after which they spend the night in the loft of a Swedish bookstore. Nick plays for her and they make love. The next morning, they are moved to the "Potato Farm" where they meet members of the French Resistance, led by Nigel "The Torch", who had been Hillary's lover when they were stranded on an island as youths. Nick is upset by Hillary's love for Nigel, but accepts that they must work together for the cause. After fighting off an attack by the East Germans (who were tipped off by a mystery traitor) they move to a pizza restaurant, where Nick proves his identity by performing for the locals.

The resistance group stages a rescue of Dr. Flammond, where Nigel and Du Quois, a resistance leader, dress up in a fake cow outfit to disable the prison's defenses. While the other members successfully infiltrate the prison, Nigel reveals himself as the traitor, but his plans are ruined by an amorous bull. Dr. Flammond is rescued, but Nigel makes off with Hillary and Nick is forced to rescue her in an underwater bar fight. With their flight about to leave, Hillary chooses to go with Nick and her father to America.

== Cast ==
- Val Kilmer as Nick Rivers
- Lucy Gutteridge as Hillary Flammond
- Christopher Villiers as Nigel "The Torch", Resistance leader
- Billy J. Mitchell as Martin, Nick Rivers's agent
- Jeremy Kemp as Gen. Streck
- Omar Sharif as Agent Cedric
- Peter Cushing as Bookstore Proprietor
- Michael Gough as Dr. Paul Flammond
- Warren Clarke as Col. von Horst
- Harry Ditson as Du Quois, Resistance member
- Jim Carter as Déjà Vu, Resistance member
- Eddie Tagoe as Chocolate Mousse, Resistance member
- John Sharp as Maitre'D
- Ian McNeice as Blind Souvenir Vendor
- Gertan Klauber as The Mayor of East Berlin
- Richard Mayes as Vladimir Biletnikov
- Tristram Jellinek as Maj. Crumpler
- John J. Carney as Klaus
- Dimitri Andreas as Latrine, Resistance member
- Vyvyan Lorrayne as Madam Bergeron

== Production ==
After the success of Airplane! the team of ZAZ were unsure of what to do next. They made the TV series Police Squad! but it was cancelled after six episodes. David Zucker explained:

We just needed a subject that we would be excited about. Starting out, we didn't have a whole genre like the airplane disaster movies. We were just fans of those black and white World War II movies that were made during the war. Somehow, we didn't think that was enough: we didn't want to do a period piece, we wanted to make it contemporary. That was the whole concept of 'Top Secret!': that it was not necessarily grounded in reality, but it would have kind of this heightened sense of craziness – even to which genres we were picking, which was a split hybrid between Elvis movies and the World War II movies.

David Zucker said they had been working on the script since Airplane! "but we just couldn't figure out how to do it. We made repeated attempts to combine a rock and roll movie with a World War II movie but it was very difficult to do ... We already had ideas for scenes we wanted to do and we tried to fit in plot around those scenes". A fourth writer, Martyn Burke, was brought in to work on the plot. "If it weren't for Martyn we'd still be sitting in that room", said Jerry Zucker. The film was mostly written at the offices of ZAZ's lawyers. The film's budget was a reported $8.5 million, whereas Airplane! was made for $3.2 million. Key portions of Top Secret! are parodies of The Conspirators, including the street scene with the novelty vendor.

For the underwater saloon fight scene the actors had to actually hold their breath and it was filmed in bits of 10 to 15 seconds each. The Swedish bookshop scene was filmed in reverse order and then played backward so that the dialog sounds like Swedish.

=== Casting ===
Kilmer was cast after the directors saw him in a play called Slab Boys with Sean Penn and Kevin Bacon. He turned up to the audition dressed like Elvis Presley. "I like to think of it as the role Elvis never got but should have," said Abrahams. Lucy Gutteridge, who plays the female lead, had just appeared in the Royal Shakespeare Company production of Nicholas Nickleby. Unlike Airplane!, the film does not feature a large number of cameos by famous actors, because, as Zucker explained, "That was one of the jokes in Airplane! and we had done it and wanted to move on." Two well-known actors who were cast in the film were Omar Sharif as Agent Cedric and Peter Cushing as a Swedish bookstore proprietor.

== Release ==
The film was test screened at various colleges and as a result of audience responses, the length was cut from around two hours to 90 minutes. The film was scheduled for release on June 8, 1984, but Paramount pushed the date back to June 22, angering some exhibitors. The official reason was that Paramount wanted to avoid competing against Ghostbusters and Gremlins, although rumours spread that the studio was dissatisfied with the film's quality. Producer Jon Davison denied this, saying: "Paramount has a lot of confidence in the picture or they wouldn't have cared. The mere fact that they've bothered to trouble some of their relationships with exhibitors shows their faith in the picture."

=== Box office ===
The film was considered a box-office bomb, though it still earned $20 million. A 1991 article speculated two possible reasons – the performance of Airplane II: The Sequel (although it had different producers from the original), along with "the lack of any clear sense of period, something that may throw viewers who insist on comedic nonessentials like interior logic. It's basically a parody of World War II-French Resistance movies, but along the way it also skewers '50s rock 'n' roll films... '60s Beach Party movies and The Blue Lagoon, among other lampoon-worthy source material." "The lesson we took from Airplane! was just fill up 90 minutes with jokes, and you have a movie", reflected David Zucker later. "With Top Secret, it's very funny, but it really isn't a good movie. It really didn't have a plot or real characters or real structure."

=== Critical reception ===
On review aggregator Rotten Tomatoes, the film has an approval rating of 77% based on 53 reviews, with an average rating of 6.6/10. The website's critical consensus reads: "Top Secret! finds the team of Zucker-Abrahams-Zucker sending up everything from spy movies to Elvis musicals with reckless, loony abandon". On Metacritic, the film holds a weighted average score of 68 out of 100 based on 15 critics, indicating "generally favorable reviews".

Roger Ebert rated it 3 1/2 out of 4 stars and applauded the humor, noting that "to describe the plot would be an exercise in futility" and "This movie will cheerfully go for a laugh wherever one is even remotely likely to be found." "Weird Al" Yankovic considers this his all-time favorite movie.
