= Lucy Gutteridge =

English actress (born 1956)

- Born: Lucy Kérimée Gutteridge; 28 November 1956 (age 69); Lewisham, London, England
- Occupation: Actress
- Years active: 1978–1993
- Spouse: Andrew Hawkins (m. 1978; div. 1983)
- Children: 1
- Father: Bernard Gutteridge

Lucy Kérimée Gutteridge (born 28 November 1956) is an English retired actress. She portrayed Gloria Morgan Vanderbilt in the television miniseries Little Gloria... Happy at Last (1982), for which she received a Golden Globe Award nomination. She is also known for playing Hillary Flammond in the 1984 comedy Top Secret!.

== Personal life ==
Gutteridge was born in London, England, the eldest daughter of Major Bernard Hugh Gutteridge, Legion of Merit, a poet and writer, by his 1947 marriage (divorced 1971) to Nabila Farah Kérimée Halim, the daughter of H.H. Prince Muhammad Said Bey Halim of Egypt and his British second wife, Nabila Malika (née Morwena Bird). Through her mother, Gutteridge is a great-great-great-granddaughter of Muhammad Ali of Egypt, a Muslim subject of the Ottoman Empire (likely of Albanian ethnicity) who became the father of modern Egypt. She is thus a distant cousin of Egypt's last king, Fuad II. She has two sisters, Anne-Marie Morwenna Gutteridge (b. 1958) and Cosima Farah Gutteridge (b. 1962). She married Andrew Hawkins, a son of the actor Jack Hawkins, in London in 1978. They had a daughter, Alice, born 1979.

== Filmography ==
=== Film ===
Year	Title	Role	Notes
1978	The Greek Tycoon	Mia	
1984	Top Secret!	Hillary Flammond	
1987	The Trouble with Spies	Mona	Shot in 1984
1988	Tusks	Micah Hill	
1993	Grief	Paula	Final role

=== Television ===
Year	Title	Role	Notes
1978	The Devil's Crown	Alys, Countess of Vexin	5 episodes
1978	The Sunday Drama	Leoni / Jennie	2 episodes
1978	Betzi	Betzi	Television film
1978	BBC2 Play of the Week	Dedee	Episode: "Renoir, My Father"
1979	BBC2 Playhouse	Cathleen Nesbitt	Episode: "Sweet Wine of Youth"
1980	Tales of the Unexpected	Josie	Episode: "Skin"
1980	Hammer House of Horror	Lolly	Episode: "Rude Awakening"
1980	Love in a Cold Climate	Linda	7 episodes
1981	Seven Dials Mystery	Lorraine Wade	Television film
1982	Little Gloria... Happy at Last	Gloria Morgan Vanderbilt	2 episodes
1982	The Life and Adventures of Nicholas Nickleby	Madeline Bray	3 episodes
1983	Live from Pebble Mill	Hermes	Episode: "Redundant! Or the Wife's Revenge"
1983	Tales of the Unexpected	Molly	Episode: "The Wrong'Un"
1983	Play of the Month	Sophie Fullgarney	Episode: "The Gay Lord Quex"
1984	A Christmas Carol	Belle	Television film
1985	Hitler's SS: Portrait in Evil	Mitzi Templer	Television film
1985	Merlin and the Sword	Niniane	Television film
1985	Edge of the Wind	Miss Benton	Television film
1987	The Hitchhiker	Jackie Dresser	Episode: "In the Name of Love"
1987	The Secret Garden	Mrs. Lennox	Television film
1988	The Woman He Loved	Thelma Furness, Viscountess Furness	Television film
1988	Tales of the Unexpected	Soroya	Episode: "The Finger of Suspicion"
1989	Judith Krantz's Till We Meet Again	Eve de Lancel	2 episodes

== Awards and nominations ==
Year	Award	Category	Nominated work	Result	Ref.
1983	40th Golden Globe Awards	Best Actress in a Miniseries or Television Film	Little Gloria... Happy at Last	Nominated	
