= Edgar Foxall =

British poet

Edgar Foxall (1906–1990) was an English poet whose work features in one of the Penguin poetry anthologies, Poetry of the Thirties (1964). Though notable for caustic political commentary and acute social observation, the natural world is a strong recurrent theme throughout his work.

== Life and work ==
Born near Ellesmere Port in Cheshire, Foxall left school at fourteen, working in a range of jobs (clerk, shop foreman, and part-time sports journalist) before training as a school teacher after World War II. Taking an active interest in local politics (he was a fervent supporter of the early Labour Party (UK)), Foxall was a prolific contributor to literary journals, magazines and the local and national press. In 1968, together with his wife Nancy, he moved to the North Wales resort town of Llandudno.

Foxall received encouragement through correspondence with both T. S. Eliot and John Masefield. He won critical acclaim from Leonard Clark, J. C. Squire and Cyril Connolly.

== Published works ==
- Proems (1938)
- Water Rat Sonata (1940)
- Poems (1947)
- Decade (1957)
- The Limitations of Moonlight (1973)
- Ultimate Harvest (1992)

== A note on working class solidarity ==
One of Foxall's most famous works, published in 1933:

There will be no festivities when
We lay down these tools
For we are the massed grooves
Of grease smooth systems.
The Communist measures the future,
The Elect fear the past
But we are those ribless polyps
That nature insures
Against thought by routines,
Against triumph by tolerance
Against life by the sense of
Mechanical footbeats
Against poverty by Cant,
Extinction by syphilis
And the glory of the crucifixion
By the price of timber.
