= John Swanwick Drennan =

Irish poet

John Swanwick Drennan (1809–1893) was an Irish poet.

Drennan was a son of William Drennan and a grandson of Thomas Drennan, minister of the First Presbyterian Church, Belfast. He had an elder brother, William Drennan (1802–73).

His poems, On the Telescopic Moon and Epigrams were featured in The Faber Book of Irish Verse in 1974.
