= Ian Callanan =

- Born: 17 March 1971 (age 55); Cork, Ireland
- Genres: Contemporary Christian, Catholic, Liturgical
- Occupations: Composer, Songwriter, Liturgist, Author
- Instruments: Piano, guitar
- Years active: 1990 – present
- Label: GIA Publications
- Website: www.iancallanan.com

Ian Callanan (born 17 March 1971) is an Irish composer of Catholic liturgical and contemporary Christian music. He is best known for composing the hymns "Comfort My People" and "Take and Eat, This is my Body".

== Biography ==
In his own words, Callanan is "one of Ireland’s leading composers of liturgical music." He hails form Cork and has been involved with liturgical music his entire life. He has been composing music for over 20 years and recently has produced his first recording for GIA Publications in the United States. He is an accomplished composer, arranger, score editor and workshop leader. Callanan's own works are inspired by Ireland's musical tradition. The popularity of his music has led to much of it being used and sung in the many varied languages throughout Europe. Much of his music has been used for television and radio broadcasts in Ireland.

He holds an honours masters' degree in Religion and Culture from Mater Dei Institute of Education, Dublin and an honours degree in Music from NUI Maynooth. He is an active member of the Dublin Diocesan Music Commission as well as being musical director for his course Music Ministry Together, a liturgical music formation program for youth and adults alike. He is also the director of the “Emmanuel” schools programme, which involves over 2,500 secondary (high school) students, learning new liturgical music, culminating in a celebration concert.

Callanan has worked with the composer Liam Lawton, arranging, producing and recording some of his earlier works. He has also worked with Davis Haas and Lori True.

== The Source of Life ==
The Source of Life has been described as 'a surprisingly powerful collection of thirteen songs celebrating the Liturgical year'.

== In Beauty We Walk ==
In Beauty We Walk is the latest collection.

As Nighttime Falls

== Discography ==
1. Winter Skies (1997) Veritas Publications
2. The Source of Life (2009) GIA Publications
3. In Beauty We Walk (2012) GIA Publications
4. As Nighttime Falls (2018) GIA Publications
5. Pilgrim People (2025) IanCallanan.com
