= Richard Weber (poet) =

Irish poet and librarian (1932–2020)

Richard Weber (born 2 September 1932 in Dublin – 15 April 2020) was an Irish poet.

== Early life ==
He was educated at Synge Street CBS and at the National College of Art in Dublin.

== Career ==
He was librarian in the National College of Art and Design in Dublin and occasionally Lecturer in English there. He further held a variety of jobs, including that of lamplighter in London (1959), bookseller's assistant (London 1959, Dublin 1961), assistant editor The Bookseller, London (1961), librarian at the Chester Beatty Library in Dublin (1961 - 1965).

He was poet-in-residence at the University of Massachusetts at Amherst in 1967; from 1967 to 1970 he was a visiting lecturer at Mount Holyoke College in Massachusetts. Weber has been advisory editor for Icarus, Journal of Trinity College Dublin and poetry editor for Poetry Ireland Review. He has contributed to many Irish, English, and American journals. His major collections are Lady & Gentleman and Stephen's Green Revisited.

== Personal life ==
Richard Weber was married, with a daughter, a son, and three grandchildren.

== Bibliography ==
Poetry Collections:

- O'Reilly: Poems. By Richard Weber. Dublin: Dolmen Press, 1957. (Dolmen chapbook; 8). [5] p.: ill
- Song for St. Stephen's Day / Richard Weber; drawings by William Carron. Dublin: Dolmen Press, 1957. 1 sheet::ill.(Dolmen Press ballad sheets; 3)
- The Time Being: A Poem in Three Parts: Autumn to Winter, Winter to Spring, Spring to Summer. By Richard Weber. Dublin: Dolmen Press, 1957. 18 p.
- Lady & Gentleman: Poems. By Richard Weber. Dublin: Dolmen Press, 1963. 24 p.
- Stephen's Green Revisited. By Richard Weber. Dublin: Dolmen Press, 1968. 64 p.
- Stephen's Green Revisited. By Richard Weber. Chester Springs, Pennsylvania, 1968. 1st American edition.
- A Few Small Ones. By Richard Weber. Ballyknockan, County Wicklow: Ballyknockan Press, 1971. 46 p.

Poems in anthologies, newspapers:

- The Tree. The Irish Times, Dublin, Saturday 3 March 1956, page 8.
- Six Irish poets: Austin Clarke, Richard Kell, Thomas Kinsella, John Montague, Richard Murphy, Richard Weber, edited by Robin Skelton. New York, Oxford: Oxford University Press, 1962. 134 p.
- A Visit to Bridge House, in: A Tribute to Austin Clarke on his Seventieth Birthday 9 May 1966, edited by John Montague and Liam Miller. Dublin: Dolmen Press, pp. 16–17. A poem that recalls the author's visit to Clarke's home.
- A Visit to Bridge House, in: John Montague, ed., Faber Book of Irish Verse. 1974.
- Poem in: Choice: an anthology of Irish poetry selected by the poets themselves with a comment on their choice, edited by Desmond Egan, Michael Hartnett. Goldsmith Press, 1979. 129 p. (Weber: "This poem was written on my return to Wicklow after three years of living and teaching in the U.S.A.")
- Hommage (Beckett). The Irish Times, Dublin, Saturday 19 April 1986, page 13.
- Elizabeth in Italy, in: A Book of Love Poetry, edited by Jon Stallworth. 1986.
- A Visit to Bridge House, in: Poetry Ireland Review, XXII & XXIII, Summer 1988.
- Last lines of the poem A Primer For Schoolchildren, in: Tausend Tode schreiben, edited by Christiane Frohmann. Berlin, 2015. ISBN 978-3-944195-55-1

Other publications:

- Richard Weber: Austin Clarke: The Arch- Poet of Dublin, in: Massachusetts Review, 11, 2 (1970), 298-301

== Reviews ==
- Austin Clarke: Verse Ancient and Modern. Review of Lady and Gentleman, by Richard Weber, and The Penguin Book of Religious Verse, ed. R. S. Thomas. The Irish Press, 11 May 1963, p. 6
- Benedict Kiely: A Chapter of Irish Writing. The New York Times, September 8, 1968.
- Library Journal, New Providence, New Jersey: Bowker, vol. 94, 1969.
- Irish Poetry of Faith and Doubt:The Cold Heaven, ed. John F. Deane, Wolfhound Press, 1990.
- Poetry in Contemporary Irish Literature, edited by Michael Kenneally. Rowman & Littlefield, 1995. 460 p. (Studies in Contemporary Irish Literature, 2) ISBN 978-0-86140-310-3
