= Bernard Gutteridge =

English poet

Bernard Hugh Gutteridge (1916–1985) was an English poet, novelist, and playwright. He is primarily known for his war poems, considered "verse-journalism of a very high order" by Vernon Scannell.

== Early life and education ==
Son of Captain Bernard George Gutteridge, MRCS, LRCP, late RAMC, of Littlecroft, Southampton, and his wife Mary, daughter of William Baxter, Gutteridge was born at Southampton, and educated at Cranleigh. He worked in advertising both before and after the war (part of the time for the J. Walter Thompson agency). His 1954 novel The Agency Game is set in the advertising world.

== Career ==
Gutteridge served during World War II in Madagascar, India, and with the 36th Division of the British Army in Burma under Combined Operations alongside Alun Lewis. He also served in the Hampshire Regiment and Royal Sussex Regiment. He reached the rank of Major, and was awarded the Legion of Merit in 1945. He was a director of the brewers Arthur Guinness, Son, & Co. from 1949 to 1979.

== Personal life ==
In 1947, Gutteridge married Nabila Farah Kérimée Halim, daughter of H.H. Prince Muhammad Said Bey Halim of Egypt and a relative of Egypt's last king, Fuad II; they were divorced in 1971. One of their three daughters is the actress Lucy Gutteridge. Gutteridge subsequently remarried, in 1971, to Elizabeth Tegher.

== Works ==
Gutteridge's writings include Traveller's Eye (1947), The Agency Game (1954), Collected Poems (1927-1955) (1956), The Clock: Poems and a Play (1973), and Old Damson-Face: Poems 1934 to 1974 (1976). Gutteridge was also a contributor to several literary magazines, and translator from Polish of Julian Tuwim's poem for children, "Lokomotywa" ("The Locomotive").
