= Francis Scarfe =

English poet, critic, novelist, academic and translator

Francis Harold Scarfe (18 September 1911 – 13 March 1986) was an English poet, critic and novelist, who became an academic, translator and Director of the British Institute in Paris.

He was born in South Shields; he was brought up from a young age at the Royal Merchant Seaman's Orphanage. He was educated at Armstrong College in Newcastle, which was then part of Durham University, where he earned a Bachelor of Arts degree in 1933. He also studied at Fitzwilliam College, Cambridge and at the Sorbonne.

While in Paris he wrote surrealist verse, and dabbled in communism, from which he then retreated. He taught at the University of Glasgow briefly before the outbreak of World War II, in which he worked in the British Army's Education Corps. He was posted to Orkney, and the Faroe Islands. While in Orkney he lodged with the family of the young George Mackay Brown, on whom he was a major influence.

His book from 1942 was one of the first to engage critically with the Auden Group, if superficially; he returned to Auden in a post-war book of greater depth. After the war he held a number of academic positions, teaching French literature at Glasgow and subsequently at the University of London, where he was professor of French from 1965 to 1978. From 1959 until his retirement he was also director of the British Institute in Paris.

== Works ==
- Inscapes (1940), poems
- Forty Poems and Ballads (1941)
- Auden & After: The Liberation Of Poetry, 1930-41 (1942), criticism
- Promises (?) first novel
- W. H. Auden (1948), criticism
- Underworlds (1950), poems
- Single Blessedness (1951), novel
- The Unfinished Woman (1954), novel
- The Art of Paul Valéry (1954)
- Picasso by Frank Elgar and Robert Maillard (1956), translator
- Baudelaire (1961, Penguin Books), editor
- Conversations on the Dresden Gallery, by Louis Aragon and Jean Cocteau (1982), translator
- Complete Verse of Charles P. Baudelaire (1986 Anvil Press Poetry), translator
- Baudelaire: the Poems in Prose (1989, Anvil Press Poetry), translator
