= Liam Callanan =

American author and professor

- Education: Yale University (BA); Georgetown University (MA); George Mason University (MFA)
- Occupations: Author; professor
- Spouse: Susan
- Website: www.liamcallanan.com

Liam Callanan is an American author and professor of English at the University of Wisconsin–Milwaukee. His novels include The Cloud Atlas (2004) and All Saints (2007).

== Background ==
Callanan earned his Bachelor of Arts at Yale and his Master of Arts (both in English) at Georgetown University, and a Master of Fine Arts in creative writing at George Mason University.

== Academia and education ==
Callanan is a professor at the University of Wisconsin–Milwaukee, where he serves as the Chair of the English Department, teaches creative writing and coordinates the Ph.D. in Creative Writing program there. He also conducts workshops in creative writing for graduate students at other universities.

He describes his "teaching and research interests" as fiction writing, creative nonfiction, 20th century American literature, magic in literature, the American West, and community-based literature programs. Callanan is the creator and co-executive producer of the Poetry Everywhere animated film series, which is an offshoot of an effort to spread poetry by means of video displays on Milwaukee County Transit System buses.

== Writing ==
His fiction includes The Cloud Atlas (Delacorte, 2004), All Saints (Delacorte, 2007), the short story collection Listen (Four Way Books, 2015), and the novel Paris by the Book (Dutton, 2018), as well as short stories in a number of little magazines and literary journals (print and online) including The Awl, Blackbird, Caketrain, Crab Orchard Review, failbetter, Phoebe, Southern Indiana Review, and The Writer's Chronicle.

He has contributed to local public radio stations (WUWM's Lake Effect) and to NPR (both as a writer and as a reader), and has written non-fiction for The Awl, Commonweal, Esquire.com, Forbes, Good Housekeeping, the New York Times Book Review, Parents, Slate, the Washington Post Magazine, and a number of other publications. He contributed a chapter to the recent compilation My Bookstore:Writers Celebrate Their Favorite Places to Browse, Read and Shop, praising Milwaukee's Boswell Bookshop.

Callanan is the creator and co-executive producer of the Poetry Everywhere animated film series.

=== The Cloud Atlas and Cloud Atlas ===
With the worldwide success of the book and the film Cloud Atlas by David Mitchell, some confusion has arisen between that work of science fiction and Callanan's unrelated 2004 novel, The Cloud Atlas (set in Alaska during World War II and the 21st century). He has written on the topic in an essay titled "Ways In Which The Movie Cloud Atlas Has Changed My Life."

== Personal life ==
He and his wife Susan live with their children in Shorewood, Wisconsin.
