= Robert Farren =

Robert Farren (Irish: Roibeárd Ó Faracháin; 24 April 1909 – 29 December 1984) was an Irish poet.

Farren was a native of County Dublin, where he worked as a school teacher and was a director of broadcasting at Raidió Teilifís Éireann. He was the author of a much-acclaimed critical work, The Course of Irish Verse in English (1948). Five of his poems were included in The Oxford Book of Irish Verse, 17th century-20th century (ed. by Donagh MacDonagh and Lennox Robinson, Clarendon Press) in 1958.
