= Emily Lawless =

Irish novelist and poet

The Honourable Emily Lawless
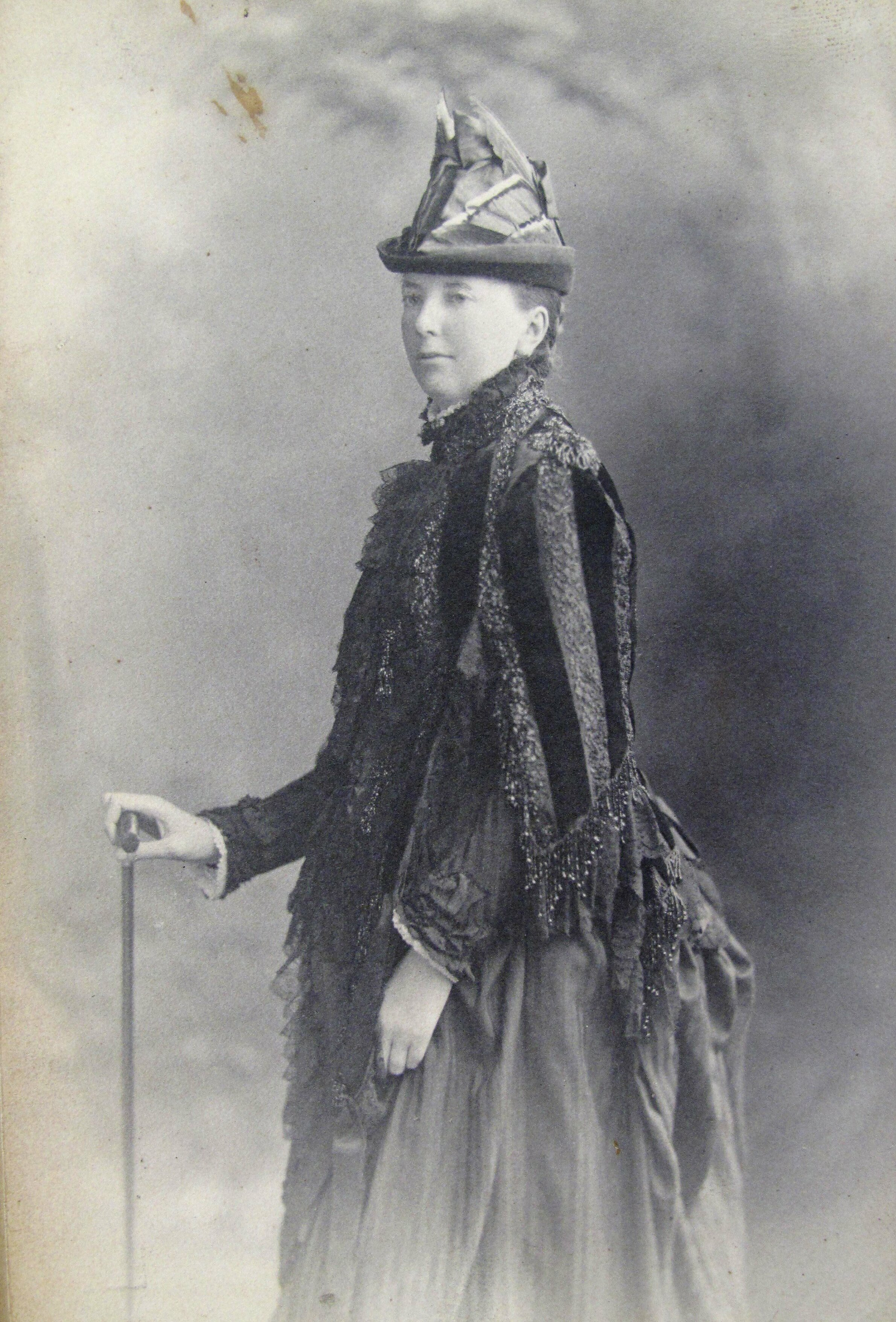
- Photographic portrait, date unknown
- Born: 17 June 1845; Lyons Demesne
- Died: 19 October 1913 (aged 68); Gomshall, Surrey
- Occupation: Writer

The Hon. Emily Lawless (17 June 1845 – 19 October 1913) was an Irish novelist, historian, entomologist, gardener, and poet from County Kildare. Her innovative approach to narrative and the psychological richness of her fiction have been identified as examples of early modernism.

== Biography ==
She was born at Lyons House below Lyons Hill, Ardclough, County Kildare. She spent part of her childhood with the Kirwans of Castle Hackett, County Galway, her mother's family, and drew on West of Ireland themes for many of her works. Her grandfather was Valentine Lawless, a member of the United Irishmen and son of a convert from Catholicism to the Church of Ireland. Her father was Edward Lawless, 3rd Baron Cloncurry (d. 1869), thus giving her the title of "The Honourable". The death of her father when she was a girl plunged the family into financial difficulties which, compounded by her lack of access to family assets as a woman, meant that she relied on income from her books.

Emily had five brothers and three sisters. Her brother Edward Lawless, who inherited the family home, was a landowner with strong Unionist opinions, a policy of not employing Roman Catholics in any position in his household, and chairman of the Property Defence Association set up in 1880 to oppose the Land League and "uphold the rights of property against organised combination to defraud". Emily Lawless was not in good terms with her brother Edward. The prominent Anglo-Irish unionist and later nationalist, Home Rule politician Horace Plunkett was a cousin. Lord Castletown, Bernard FitzPatrick, 2nd Baron Castletown was also a cousin.

According to Betty Webb Brewer, writing in 1983 for the journal of the Irish American Cultural Institute, Éire/Ireland: "An unflagging unionist, she recognised the rich literary potential in the native tradition and wrote novels with peasant heroes and heroines, Lawless depicted with equal sympathy the Anglo-Irish landholders." This is the prevalent view of Lawless, yet she unequivocally referred to her Irish "patriotism", and her unshakeable love of Ireland, and several of her short stories denounce the inequalities brought about by colonialism and landlordism in Ireland. W.B.Yeats wrote scathingly about Lawless's supposed stereotyping of Irish peasants, and his views later contributed to the neglect of her work. Similarly, her initial opposition to female suffrage has been often read as an anti-feminist position (rather than a "feminism of difference"), yet much of her work makes a strong case for female autonomy, in financial and creative terms, and Lawless was a noted and popular writer in the "New Woman" movement which swept English fiction and journalism in the late nineteenth century. Beginning in 1911, she lived with Lady Sarah Spencer, dedicatee of A Garden Diary (1901), at a house named Hazelhatch in Gomshall, Surrey. Lawless died at Gomshall on 19 October 1913.

She occasionally wrote under the pen name "Edith Lytton".

Some archival material pertaining to Emily Lawless is held in Marsh's Library, Dublin.

== Writings ==
Lawless wrote nineteen works of fiction, biography, history, nature studies and poetry, many of which were widely read at the time. She is increasingly considered a major fiction writer of the late nineteenth century, and an early modernist innovator. She is often remembered for her Wild Geese poems (1902). Her books were:

- A Chelsea Householder (1882)
- A Millionaire's cousin (1885)
- Ireland (1885)
- Hurrish (1886)
- Major Lawrence FLS (1887)
- With Essex in Ireland (1890)
- Grania (1892)
- Maelcho (1894)
- Plain Frances Mowbray and Other Tales (1889)
- A Colonel of the Empire (1895)
- Traits and Confidences (1898)
- Atlantic Rhymes & Rhythms (1898)
- A Garden Diary (1901)
- With The Wild Geese (1902)
- Maria Edgeworth (1904)
- Book of Gilly (1906)
- The Point of View (1909)
- The Race of Castlebar (1914) - co-authored with Shan Bullock
- The Inalienable Heritage (1914)

=== Hurrish ===
Some critics identify a theme of noble landlord and noble peasant in her fourth book, Hurrish, a Land War story set in the Burren County Clare which was read by William Ewart Gladstone and said to have influenced his policy. It deals with the theme of Irish hostility to English law. In the course of the book a landlord is assassinated, and Hurrish's mother, Bridget, refuses to identify the murderer, a dull-witted brutal neighbour.

It described the Burren Hills as "skeletons—rain-worn, time-worn, wind-worn—starvation made visible, and embodied in a landscape." The book was criticised by Irish-Ireland journals for its 'grossly exaggerated violence', its embarrassing dialect, staid characters. According to The Nation "she looked down on peasantry from the pinnacle of her three generation nobility".

Her reputation was damaged by William Butler Yeats who accused her in a critique of having "an imperfect sympathy with the Celtic nature" and for adopting "theory invented by political journalists and forensic historians". Despite this, Yeats included With Essex in Ireland and Maelcho in his list of the best Irish novels.

=== Essex and Grania ===
Her historical novel With Essex in Ireland was better received and was ahead of its time in developing the unreliable narrator as a technique. Gladstone mistook it for an authentic Elizabethan document.

Her seventh book, Grania, about "a very queer girl leaping and dancing over the rocks of the sea" examined the misogyny of an Aran Island fishing society.

=== With the Wild Geese ===
Unusually for such a strong Unionist, her Wild Geese poems (1902) became very popular and were widely quoted in nationalist circles, especially the lines:

War-battered dogs are we,
Fighters in every clime;
Fillers of trench and of grave,
Mockers bemocked by time.
War-dogs hungry and grey,
Gnawing a naked bone,
Fighters in every clime
Every cause but our own

Two of the poems, "Clare Coast" (source of the above lines) and "After Aughrim" were included in The Oxford Book of Irish Verse (1958).

== Legacy ==
- Her papers are in Marsh's Library in Dublin.
- Emily Lawless Court in Bayside, Dublin bears her name.
