= Andrew Young (poet, born 1885) =

Scottish poet and clergyman

- Born: 29 April 1885
- Died: 25 November 1971 (aged 86)
- Occupations: Clergyman, poet

Andrew John Young (29 April 1885 – 25 November 1971) was a Scottish poet and clergyman, although recognition of his poetry was slow to develop.

== Life ==
Andrew Young was born to the stationmaster of Elgin in Scotland in 1885. Two years later his father moved to Edinburgh, where young Andrew attended the Royal High School and later took an arts degree at the University of Edinburgh. The disappearance of his brother David in discreditable circumstances in 1907 so affected him that he gave up his intention to become a barrister and instead studied theology at the local New College. Old habits died hard, however, and his first collection of poems, Songs of Night, a work of Swinburnean aestheticism, was published in 1910 at his father's expense - pillar of the presbytery though he was.

Ordained into the United Free Church of Scotland in 1912, Young was appointed two years later to his first ministry in the village of Temple, Midlothian, and married Janet Green, who was lecturing in English at a teacher training college in Glasgow. Thereafter she devoted her energies to looking after their two children, Anthony (1915–1987) and Alison (1922–2001), and making it possible for her husband to pursue his literary career.

After the hiatus of war service, Young's next appointment took him to Sussex where in 1920 he became the minister of the Presbyterian Church at Hove. In that year too Boaz and Ruth, his next collection was published, shortly followed by several more. The style was now that of the Georgian poets, among whom he had many friends. In 1939 he applied for admission to the Anglican ministry and in 1941 became Vicar of the rural parish of Stonegate in East Sussex. In 1959 he was enabled to retire and moved to Yapton, where he had become a canon of the nearby Chichester Cathedral.

== Later writing ==
Young came to reject his former style upon achieving the honed and focused nature poetry of Winter Harvest (1933) and the four later collections that he called his canon. Earlier poems were now 'quarried' and rewritten in his new style. The change was signalled by signing these poems as Andrew Young, rather than A.J.Young as formerly, and it was only from the publication of the 1960 Collected Poems that editors began to use selections from the earlier work again. His new manner was characterised by sharp observation and the movement of the poetry towards a striking final image, as in the short "Essex Salt-Marsh".

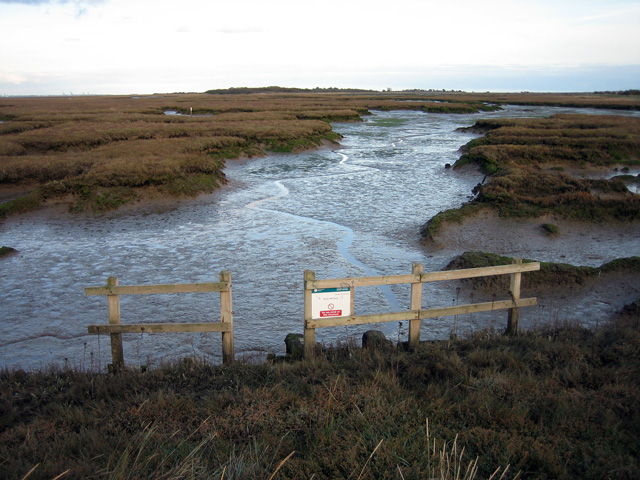
Salt marsh in Essex

Now the tide’s task is done,
Marsh runnels turn and chuckling run
Or come to a standstill,
The level ground for them a breathless hill.

And as they run or faint
Through mud that takes the sunset’s paint,
The gullies they have worn
Shine as with purple grapes and golden corn.

There were several musical settings of his poetry, including the incidental music composed by Imogen Holst for his play Nicodemus (1937). "Christmas Day" from his collection Speak to the Earth (1939) also proved popular with composers and was set by Mervyn Roberts (1947), Robin Milford (1949), Neil Butterworth (1954), and Elizabeth Poston (1967).

The work of his later years included the two long religious poems of Out of the World and Back (1958), highly regarded at the time, and several prose works dealing with botany and the landscape. His literary reputation was being fostered in these years by Leonard Clark, who made selections and collections of his poetry between 1959 and 1974. Thereafter his daughter, who had married the poet Edward Lowbury, continued the work.

Recognition of Young's writing came slowly. The Royal Society of Literature awarded him the Benson Medal in 1939 and gave him an honorary fellowship in 1951. In that year too he received an honorary degree from the University of Edinburgh and, in the following year, was awarded the Queen's Gold Medal for Poetry.

== Works ==
- Songs of Night (1910)
- Boaz and Ruth (1920)
- The death of Eli (1921)
- Thirty One Poems (1922)
- The Cuckoo Clock (1922)
- The Adversary (1923) - verse plays
- The Bird Cage (1926)
- The New Shepherd (1931)
- Winter Harvest (1933)
- The White Blackbird (1935)
- Collected Poems (1936, Cape)
- Nicodemus (1937) - verse play
- Speak to the Earth (1939)
- A Prospect of Flowers (1944) - prose
- The Green Man (1947)
- A Retrospect of Flowers (1950) - prose
- Collected Poems (1950, Cape)
- Into Hades (1952)
- A Prospect of Britain (1956) - prose
- Out of the World and Back: into Hades, & A Travller in Time: two poems (1958)
- Quiet as Moss: 36 Poems (1959, 1967) - selection by Leonard Clark
- Collected Poems (1960, Hart-Davis)
- The Poet and the Landscape (1962) - prose
- Burning as Light: 37 poems (1967) - selection by Leonard Clark
- The New Poly-Olbion (1967) - prose poems

Posthumous publications

- The Poetic Jesus (SPCK, London 1972) - prose
- Complete Poems (Secker & Warburg, London 1974)
- Andrew Young : remembrance and homage (Tidal Press, Maine, 1978) - small selection
- Parables (Keepsake Press, Richmond 1985) - mini-sermons
- The Thirteenth Key (Protean Publishing Company, Birmingham 1985) - fiction
- Poetical Works (Secker & Warburg, London 1985)
- Crystal and Flint (Snake River Press, Brighton 1991) - selection
- Selected Poems (Carcanet, Manchester 1998)
