= R. N. D. Wilson =

Robert (or Robin) Noble Denison Wilson, known as R. N. D. Wilson (1899 – January 1953) was an Irish poet.

From 1934 to 1944 he was a teacher at Rendcomb College. His published work includes the collection The Holy Wells of Orris and other poems (London, John Lane The Bodley Head, 1927), the style of which has been described as "early Yeatsian romanticism". Austin Clarke, while agreeing that the book was too much influenced by Yeats, observed that the poem "Saint Apollinare in Classe" 'anticipated the romanticism of the Byzantine poems' of Yeats. Wilson's poem "Elegy in a Presbyterian Burying-Ground" was included in the 1974 Faber Book of Irish Verse.

Other books included:

- Equinox, T. Nelson (London / New York, 1937).
- Raghley, O Raghley : and other poems, (Edinburgh : Printed for Lawrence Wilson by Robert Mitchell and Sons, 1955).
