= William Larminie =

Irish poet and folklorist

William Larminie (1 August 1849 – 19 January 1900) was an Irish poet and folklorist.

He was born in Castlebar, County Mayo, of Huguenot descent and was educated at Kingstown School and Trinity College Dublin, from which he graduated in 1871 with a moderatorship in Classics. He moved to London while he was employed in the British India Office from 1873 until 1887, at which point he retired and returned to Ireland to devote himself to writing, settling in Bray, County Wicklow.

He published two volumes of poetry—Glanlua and Other Poems (1889), and Fand and Other Poems (1892)—as well as a collection of stories which he had collected from local people in County Donegal, County Mayo and County Galway: West Irish Folk-Tales and Romances (1893).

Like his contemporaries John Todhunter and W. B. Yeats, he turned to Irish mythology for inspiration. His most famous poem is The Nameless Doon, about a stone ringfort, over 4000 years old and long abandoned, in Drumboghill, County Donegal.

Who were the builders? Question not the silence

That settles on the lake for evermore,

Save when the sea-bird screams and to the islands

The echo answers from the steep-cliffed shore.

- from The Nameless Doon, Fand and Other Poems

He attempted in his poetry to adopt some of the traditional Irish verse forms such as the use of assonance.

In his later years, he devoted himself to a translation into English of the Irish philosopher John Scotus Eriugena's De divisione naturae. His translation, which was never published, was deposited in the National Library of Ireland.

He died at his home in Bray and is buried in Enniskerry.
