= Patrick MacDonogh =

Irish poet

Patrick MacDonogh (1902–1961) was an Irish poet who published five books of poetry in his lifetime. His work is included in the Faber Book of Irish Verse.

== Biography ==
Patrick MacDonogh was born in Dublin, one of five children. His father was headmaster of Avoca School, Blackrock. MacDonogh attended Avoca School and later Trinity College, Dublin. After graduating, MacDonogh taught and worked as a commercial artist. He was later hired by the brewers of Guinness, and would become a senior executive at the company.

MacDonogh was published in outlets including Dublin Magazine, the Observer, Harper's, and The American Mercury. Much of MacDonogh's poetry was set in north and south County Dublin and County Meath, specifically the Kinsealy woodlands and the Malahide estuary. His 1943 collection Over the Water produced his best-known poem, "She Walked Unaware", one of several folk song-esque poems he became known for. The collection, written during World War II, also dwelled upon wartime themes.

Toward the end of his life, MacDonogh suffered increasing physical and mental health problems, including manic depression, and spent several stretches in psychiatric hospitals. He died by suicide in 1961.

== Personal life ==
Patrick MacDonogh married Ellen (Maisie) Connell, who was a mezzo-soprano. They had two daughters.

MacDonogh was also an accomplished field hockey player, playing for the Irish team between 1937 and 1939.

== Bibliography ==
- Flirtation (G. F. Healy, Dublin, 1927)
- A Leaf in the Wind (Quota Press, Belfast, 1929)
- The Vestal Fire (Orwell Press, Dublin, 1941)
- Over the Water (Orwell Press, 1943)
- One Landscape Still and Other Poems (Secker & Warburg, London, 1958)
