= John Lyle Donaghy =

Irish poet

John Lyle Donaghy (1902 – 1949) was an Irish poet.

John Lyle Donaghy was born on 28 July 1902 in Larne, the eldest son of a Presbyterian minister. He was educated at Larne Grammar School and Trinity College, Dublin, after which he became a teacher, in London in 1930, living there with his wife Lilian. Afterwards moved to Dublin, where they lived in a cottage owned by Joseph Campbell. He died of tuberculosis on 4 May 1949.

Donaghy was active in theatrical activities, founding the Phoenix Theatre in Dún Laoghaire in 1932. He published in T.S. Eliot’s The Criterion and Poetry (Chicago) and appeared in the Devin-Adair anthology New Irish Poets (1949).

Donaghy's poems Winter, Portrait, Duck and Deathward were featured in the Faber Book of Irish Verse, first published in 1974.

His work is praised in Samuel Beckett's 1934 essay 'Recent Irish Poetry'.

== Bibliography ==
- At dawn above Aherlow. Dublin: Cuala Press, 1926.
- Primordia caeca: poems. Dublin: Eason, 1927.
- Ad perennis vitae fontem. Dublin: Minorca Press, 1928.
- The Flute Over the Valley: Antrim Song. Larne: Inver Press, 1931.
- The Blackbird: Songs of Innisfail. Dublin: Cahill, 1933.
- Into the Light and other poems. Dublin: Cuala Press, 1934.
- Selected Poems. Dublin: Orwell Press, 1939.
- Wilderness Sings. Dublin: Wood Printing Works, for the author, 1942.
- Wild Sun and Moon: poems 1941-1945. Dublin: Wood Printing Works, for the author, 1949.
