= Leonard Clark (poet) =

English poet

Leonard Clark OBE, KSS, FRSL
- Born: August 1, 1905; Saint Peter Port, Guernsey
- Died: September 1981; London, England
- Occupations: Poet, writer, editor, educator
- Years active: 1923—1981

Leonard Clark (1 August 1905 – September 1981) was an English poet, writer, editor, and educator. Though his works do occasionally mention Devon and Yorkshire, they always return to the Forest of Dean. His pieces center around people and places familiar to him from, as well as the nature of, his hometown Cinderford.

== Biography ==
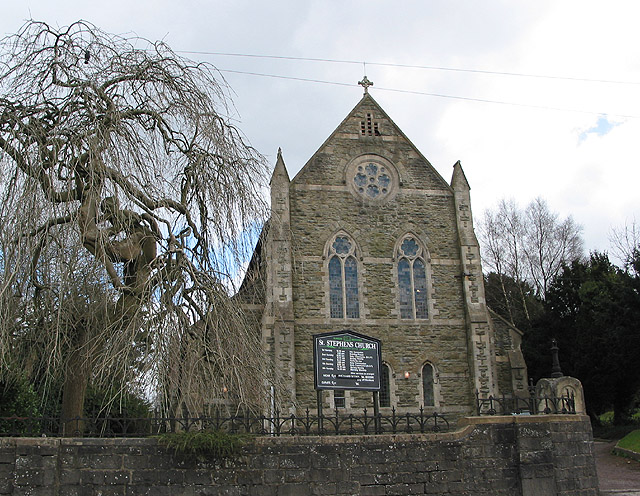
St. Stephen's Church in Cinderford

Clark was born on 1 August 1905 in Saint Peter Port, Guernsey to a governess out of wedlock. He was sent to live with widow Sarah Annie George and her sons Allan, George, and Frederick in Cinderford in the Forest of Dean. The family regularly attended St. Stephen's Church. Though he came to consider Sarah Annie, Allan, George, and Frederick his family, he struggled with feeling like an outside throughout his life. Clark attended Bilson Primary School and Double View School (now Heywood Community School) before earning a scholarship to Monmouth School in Monmouth, Wales; he was unable to continue his education at Monmouth due to financial constraints. In his final year of school, Clark met Forest poet F.W. Harvey, who served as his mentor and helped him write and publish a collection of poetry in 1923.

Clark worked as a pupil teacher with the goal of eventually becoming an educator. He taught from 1922—1928 in Gloucestershire before earning his Certificate in Education from Bangor Normal College in 1930. He then moved to London, where he taught from 1930—1936. In 1936, he became an Inspector of Education [HMI], a position he held until his retirement in 1970. In this role, he worked in Devon, Yorkshire, and London. Clark married Florence Tobias in 1933 at St. Stephen's Church; Harvey served as his best man. In the late 1930s, the couple moved to Plymouth. Their newborn son Robin died in 1939 and they divorced shortly after. Clark had at least one more son.

Clark wrote more than 50 books of poetry, prose, anthologies, and essays of his own and edited more than 20 more during his career. Some of his best known works are The Hearing Heart, Singing in the Streets: Poems for Christmas, and English Morning and Other Poems. He wrote a biography of Alfred Williams in his early years and edited collections by Andrew Young, Walter de la Mare, and Ivor Gurney. He also edited the Longman's Poetry Library series, was consulting editor for Chatto & Windus' children's poetry books and to Thornhill Press, and contributed frequently to The Citizen and the Dean Forest Mercury.

In 1966, Clark was awarded an OBE. He was also a fellow of the Royal Society of Literature and received the Children's Literature Association's award for "his critical article Poetry and Children" published in 1978. In 1970, he was made a knight of St. Sylvester. He was on the Literature Panel of the Arts Council and on the Westminster Dioceses School Panel.

Clark died in September 1981 at his London home. His son scattered half his ashes from the viewpoint in Symonds Yat and interred the other half in St. Stephen's Church. A plaque marks his resting place.

== Legacy and impact ==
In 2018, Tom Cousins painted a mural on the side of a Cinderford bakery featuring Clark along with fellow Forest poets Winifred Foley and Harry Beddington. His poem Stillborn is written in the voice of a mother who has lost her child and wonders: "[did] you [reject] us?" It is still used in support groups for families of stillborn babies.

== Selected bibliography ==
Poetry

- English Morning and Other Poems (1953)
- Near and Far: Poems for Children (1968)
- The Broad Atlantic (1974)
- The Hearing Heart (1974)
- The Way It Was: Poems (1980)
- An Intimate Landscape (1981)

Children's stories

- Robert Andrew Tells a Story (1965)
- Robert Andrew by the Sea (1965)
- Robert Andrew in the Country (1966)
- Mr. Pettigrew's Harvest Festival (1974)
- Mr. Pettigrew's Train (1975)
- Mr. Pettigrew and the Bellringers (1976)

Anthologies and compilations

- The Open Door: An Anthology of Verse for Juniors (1937)
- The Magic Kingdom: An Anthology of Verse for Seniors (1937)
- All Things New (1965)
- All Along, Down Along: A Book of Stories in Verse (1971)

Prose

- Green Wood: A Gloucestershire Childhood (1962)
- A Fool in the Forest (1965)
- Grateful Caliban (1967)
- An Inspector Remembers (1976)

Edited books

- Prospect of a Poet: Essays and Tributes by Fourteen Writers by Andrew Young (1957)
- The Collected Poems by Andrew Young (1963)
- Sound of Battle by Ivor Gurney (1969)

Biographies

- A Handlist of the Writings in Book Form (1902—53) of Walter de la Mare (1953)
- Walter de la Mare: A Checklist (1956)
- Alfred Williams: His Life and Work (1969)
