= John Todhunter =

Irish poet and playwright (1839–1916)

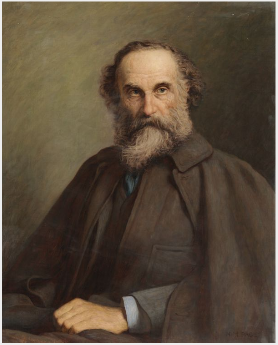
- Genre: poetry; plays

John Todhunter (30 December 1839 – 25 October 1916) was an Irish poet and playwright who wrote seven volumes of poetry, and several plays.

== Life ==
Todhunter was born in Dublin, the eldest son of Thomas Harvey Todhunter, a Quaker merchant of English origin. He was educated at Quaker schools, including Bootham School, York and Mountmellick in Ireland. He started work at his father's offices in Dublin and London before continuing on to attend Trinity College, where he studied medicine. While at Trinity, Todhunter won the Vice-Chancellor's prize for English Verse 1864, 1865 and 1866, and the Gold Medal of the Philosophical Society 1866 for an essay. He also clerked for William Stokes while studying. Todhunter received his Bachelor of Medicine in 1867, and his Doctorate of Medicine degree in 1871. At Trinity he also contributed to the literary magazine Kottabos.

In 1870 (one year prior to his DM) he became a Professor of English Literature at Alexandra College, Dublin. Four years later, Todhunter resigned from that position and travelled to Egypt and several places in Europe. He married Dora L. Digby in 1879. In 1881, he finally settled in London, where his home in Bedford Park, Chiswick was located in a small community of writers and artists, including W. B. Yeats. He was involved in the founding of the Irish Literary Society there.

His tragedy, The Black Cat only received one performance, on 8 December 1893 at the Opera Comique, by the Independent Theatre Society—a private club formed to forestall censorship by the Lord Chamberlain's Office. Todhunter is best known for his 1896 work: Irish Bardic Tales.

== Works ==
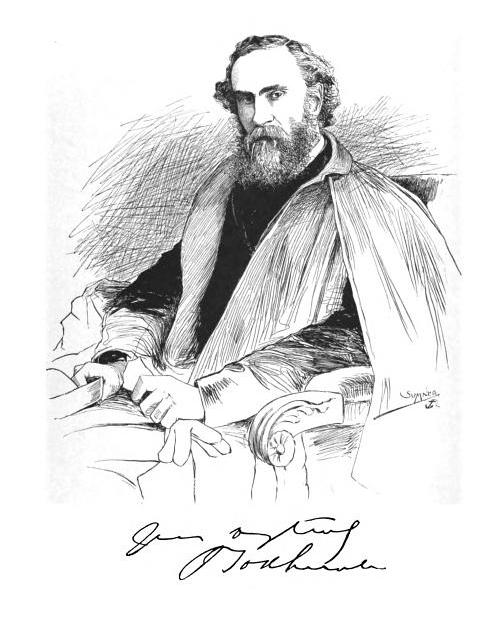
Sketch of John Todhunter in The Magazine of Poetry 1889

- Laurella and Other Poems (1876)
- Alcestis: A Dramatic Poem (1878)
- The True Tragedy of Rienzi; Tribune of Rome (1881)
- Forest Songs & Other Poems (1881)
- The Banshee and Other Poems (1888)
- How Dreams Come True (1890)
- The Poison Flower (1891)
- The Legend of Stauffenberg (1890)
- The Irish Bardic Tales (1896)
- Sounds and Sweet Airs (1904)
- An Irish Love song
- The Black Knight

=== Plays ===
- Helena in Troas (1886)
- A Sicilian Idyll (1890)
- The Black Cat (1893)
- A Comedy of Sighs (1894)

=== Prose ===
- A study of Shelley (1879)
- The Life of Patrick Sarsfield, Earl of Lucan (1901)

=== Translation from German ===
- Heinrich Heine's Book of Songs (1907)

Many of Todhunter's poems are available online, and some of his works are being processed by Distributed Proofreaders.

== Obituary ==
The Times of London published an obituary of Todhunter, which included the following passage:

Todhunter's first volume was a collection of narrative and lyrical poems entitled "Laurella" (1876). Grace, tenderness, and melody marked these poems; in later years he did much stronger work under the influence of ancient Celtic literature, to the study of which he was led by the memorable rendering of the Cuchullin legend published in 1878 by Standish O'Grady. The "Banshee" (1888) and "Three Bardic Talcs" (1896) contain the best of Todhunter's work in poetry. Three plays of his have been acted with success; one of them, The Black Cat, produced by the Independent Theatre in 1893, was a factor in the revival of the literary drama. His translation of Heine's "Buch der Lieder" is perhaps the best complete English version of a work than which none more irresistibly attracts or more cruelly eludes the art of the translator. He was also author of a few brief prose works, including a "Life of Sarsfield" and a "Study of Shelley."

At one time he was a familiar figure at the Savile Club, but for some years his delicate health and his constitutional hatred of noise and bustle kept him far from town life. He was a man of striking appearance, and the sweetness, unselfishness, and loyalty of his character gave to intimacy with him a charm and fragrance which his friends will not easily forget.
