= Jeremiah Joseph Callanan =

Irish poet

Jeremiah Joseph Callanan, or James Joseph Callanan (1795–1829), Irish poet, was born in Ballinhassig County Cork in 1795 to a medical family, died 19 September 1829 at the Hospital of São José, Lisbon, Portugal.

== Life ==
Callanan studied for Catholic priesthood at Maynooth College, and afterwards law at Trinity College, Dublin, where he won two prizes for his poems. He left in 1816 after determining he had no vocation.

He returned to Cork to become a tutor, though he subsequently entered Trinity College, Dublin, on an aborted idea of legal studies. With his financial resources exhausted, he enlisted in the 18th Royal Irish but was bought out by some friends.

In 1823 he was for a few months an assistant as the school of a Doctor Maginn in the city. Maginn introduced him to Blackwood's Magazine to which Callanan became a contributor, as well as to other magazines. According to the 1878 Compendium of Irish Biography.

"During six years, and up to 1829, he spent most of his time in rambling through the country, collecting old ballads and legends, and giving them a new dress in a new tongue. His health began to fail, however, a warmer climate appeared desirable, and early in 1829 he became tutor in the family of an Irish gentleman at Lisbon. In a few months it is stated that he acquired sufficient of the language to make translations from Portuguese poetry. He also set about preparing his writings for publication in a collected form. His health, however, daily declined, and after a fruitless effort to gather strength for the voyage home, he died 19th September 1829, aged 33. Mr. Waller writes of him in these words: "Thoroughly acquainted with the romantic legends of his country, he was singularly happy in the graces and power of language, and the feeling and beauty of his sentiments. There is in his compositions little of that high classicality which marks the scholar; but they are full of exquisite simplicity and tenderness, and in his description of natural scenery he is unrivalled. His lines on Gougane Barra are known to every tourist that visits the romantic regions of the south of Ireland, and his longer poems possess great merit." Allibone styles this poem "the most perfect perhaps of all Irish minor poems in the melody of its rhythm, the flow of its language, and the weird force of its expressions."

No trace of his grave in Lisbon now remains.

Callanan also contributed translations of Irish verse to Blackwood's Magazine before traveling to Lisbon to work as a tutor in 1827. Jeremiah Callanan died in Lisbon in 1829, as he was preparing to return to Ireland.

His great-niece is Academy Award-nominated actress Pauline Collins.

== Well-known poems ==
"The Outlaw of Loch Lene," Callanan's most well-known poem, begins with the line, "O many a day have I made good ale in the glen". It is one of the two Callanan poems included in Brendan Kennelly's The Penguin Book of Irish Verse (1970) the other one being "The Convict of Clonmel". Both are translations from the Irish.

== Books of poetry ==
- Recluse of Inchidony, and other Poems. 1830.
- Poems (ed. M.F. McCarthy). 1847.
- The Poems of J. J. Callanan. A New Edition, with Biographical Introduction and Notes (c) 1992 Chadwyck-Healey
