= The Penguin Book of Canadian Verse =

The Penguin Book of Canadian Verse was first published in 1942 as Anthology of Canadian Poetry (English) under the Pelican Books imprint. Edited by Canadian poet Ralph Gustafson, revised and expanded editions were published in 1958, 1967 and 1984.

== Reception ==
Writing on the 1958 edition in Books Abroad, A. L. McLeod called it a "comprehensive anthology", improving on the first edition with better representation of styles and inclusion of less well-known poems.

In a 1975 biographical article for the journal Mosaic, Robin Skelton credited Gustafson with bringing modern Canadian poetry to world attention with the editions of the Book of Canadian Verse and also A Little Anthology of Canadian Verse (1943).

== Contributors ==
Poets in the 1984 edition include:

Milton Acorn - George Amabile - Patrick Anderson - Margaret Atwood - Margaret Avison - Alfred G. Bailey - Doug Beardsley - Earle Birney - bill bissett - George Bowering - Elizabeth Brewster - Robert Bringhurst - George Frederick Cameron - Wilfred Campbell - Bliss Carman - Leonard Cohen - Don Coles - Isabella Valancy Crawford - William Henry Drummond - Louis Dudek - R. G. Everson - Marya Fiamengo - Robert Finch - R. A. D. Ford - John Glassco - Oliver Goldsmith - Eldon Grier - Ralph Gustafson - Charles Heavysege - David Helwig - John Frederic Herbin - Pauline Johnson - George Johnston - George Jonas - D. G. Jones - Lionel Kearns - Leo Kennedy - A. M. Klein - Raymond Knister - Robert Kroetsch - Archibald Lampman - Patrick Lane - George T. Lanigan - Irving Layton - Dennis Lee - Douglas Le Pan - Kenneth Leslie - Charles Lillard - Dorothy Livesay - Malcolm Lowry - Pat Lowther - Gwendolyn MacEwen - Tom MacInnes - Jay Macpherson - Charles Mair - Eli Mandel - Tom Marshall - Seymour Mayne - John McCrae - Don McKay - Alexander McLachlan - George McWhirter - John Newlove - Alden Nowlan - Michael Ondaatje - P. K. Page - Marjorie Pickthall - E. J. Pratt - Al Purdy - James Reaney - Charles G. D. Roberts - Theodore Goodridge Roberts - Joe Rosenblatt - W. W. E. Ross - Charles Sangster - Duncan Campbell Scott - Frederick George Scott - F. R. Scott - Robert W. Service - Virna Sheard - Robin Skelton - A. J. M. Smith - David Solway - Raymond Souster - John Thompson - Peter Van Toorn - Miriam Waddington - Bertram Warr - Tom Wayman - Phyllis Webb - Anne Wilkinson

== See also ==
- 1942 in poetry
- 1942 in literature
- Canadian poetry
- List of poetry anthologies
