= List of poetry anthologies =

This is a list of anthologies of poetry.

== A–C ==
- American Poetry Since 1950, 1993
- Anthology of Modern Serbian Lyric, 1911
- Anthology of Twentieth-Century British and Irish Poetry, 2001
- Book of Aneirin (c. 1265), Welsh medieval manuscript
- The Best American Poetry series
- Best New Poets series
- British Poetry since 1945, 1970
- Broadview Anthology of Poetry, 1993
- Children of Albion: Poetry of the Underground in Britain, 1969
- Conductors of Chaos: A Poetry Anthology, 1996
- Contes et nouvelles en vers (1665), ribald tales collected and versified by Jean de La Fontaine

== E–K ==
- Englands Helicon, 1600
- Faber Book of Irish Verse, 1974
- Faber Book of Modern American Verse, 1956
- Faber Book of Modern Verse, 1936
- Faber Book of Twentieth Century Verse, 1953
- From the Other Side of the Century: "A New American Poetry, 1960–1990", 1994
- Furious Flower: Seeding the Future of African American Poetry, 2019
- Georgian Poetry
- Golden Treasury of Scottish Poetry, edited by Hugh MacDiarmid, 1940
- Greek Anthology, 10th and 14th century
- The Harvill Book of Twentieth-Century Poetry in English, 1999
- Hinterland: Caribbean Poetry from the West Indies and Britain, 1989
- Hyakunin Isshū (13th century) (one hundred people, one poem), compiled by the 13th-century Japanese poet and critic Fujiwara no Teika, an important collection of Japanese waka poems from the 7th through the 13th centuries
- Kaifūsō (751) (Fond Recollections of Poetry), the oldest collection of Chinese poetry (kanshi) written by Japanese poets
- Kokin Wakashū (completed around 905) (collection of Japanese poems from ancient and current times), the first Japanese Imperial poetry anthology

== L–O ==
- lezenswaard www.lezenswaard.be: free international multilingual (Poetry & Prose) anthology website in English, Dutch, French & German
- Lieblingminne und Freundesliebe in der Weltliteratur
- Man'yōshū (around 759) (Anthology of a Myriad Leaves), the first great Japanese poetry anthology, compiled by the poet Ōtomo no Yakamochi
- Metrical Dindshenchas
- Modern Scottish Poetry (Faber)
- The New American Poetry 1945-1960
- The New British Poetry
- New Oxford Book of English Verse 1250-1950
- New Poets of England and America
- The New Poetry, A. Alvarez ed.
- New Provinces, F.R. Scott ed.
- Other: British and Irish Poetry since 1970
- Oxford Book of Contemporary Verse
- Oxford Book of English Mystical Verse
- Oxford Book of English Verse
- Oxford Book of Modern Verse 1892–1935
- The Oxford Book of Twentieth Century English Verse
- The Oxford Book of Welsh Verse
- The Oxford Book of Welsh Verse in English
- Oxford period poetry anthologies
- Oxford poetry anthologies
- Oxford religious poetry anthologies

== P–Z ==
- Palgrave's Golden Treasury, 1861
- Penguin Book of Canadian Verse, 1942
- Penguin Book of Contemporary British Poetry, 1982
- Penguin Book of Contemporary Verse (1918–1960)
- Penguin Book of Modern African Poetry, 1984
- The Penguin Book of Modern Australian Poetry, 1991
- Penguin Modern Poets, 1960s and 1970s
- Penguin poetry anthologies
- The Percy Folio, 17th century
- Poem and Poet
- Poems for the Hazara
- Poems of Black Africa, ed. by Wole Soyinka, 1975
- Poems of Today
- Poetry Speaks Expanded, ed. by Elise Paschen and Rebekah Presson Mosby, 2007
- Postmodern American Poetry, 1994
- Reliques of Ancient English Poetry, 1765
- Shi Jing
- Theragatha and Therigatha
- Three Chinese Poets, translated by Vikram Seth
- Tottel's Miscellany, 1557
- Up The Line To Death, 1964
- World Poetry Tree: An Anthology for Hope, Love and Peace, 2022

== See also ==
- List of Chinese poetry anthologies
- List of poems
- List of poetry collections
- List of poetry groups and movements
- Lists of poets
- List of Japanese Anthologies
- List of years in poetry
- List of years in literature
- Anthology listings by editor
  - Arthur St. John Adcock
  - Richard Aldington
  - Donald Allen
  - Kingsley Amis
  - Henry Charles Beeching
  - W. H. Davies
  - Cecil Day-Lewis
  - Walter de la Mare
  - G. S. Fraser
  - John Gawsworth
  - Geoffrey Grigson
  - Paul Hoover
  - Elizabeth Jennings
  - John Lehmann
  - Jack Lindsay
  - Robert Wilson Lynd
  - Douglas Messerli
  - Harold Monro
  - Ivo Mosley
  - Thomas Moult
  - Michael Roberts
  - Jaydeep Sarangi
  - William Kean Seymour
  - Ron Silliman
  - J. C. Squire
  - The Sitwells
  - Eliot Weinberger
- Anthology listings by group
  - The Movement
- Anthology listings by publisher
  - The Bodley Head
- Anthology awards
  - EPPIE Award for Poetry in an Anthology
