= Broadview Anthology of Poetry =

1993 poetry anthology

The Broadview Anthology of Poetry (ISBN 978-1551110066) is a 1993 poetry anthology compiled by Canadian academics Herbert Rosengarten and Amanda Goldrick-Jones.

It states the aim of including a 'wide range' of poetry in English, with the aim of being representative geographically and in other ways (in particular the inclusion of women). Within that brief it tries to be representative also of each of American poetry, British poetry and Canadian poetry.

== Poets in The Broadview Anthology of Poetry ==
- Fleur Adcock
- Maya Angelou
- Matthew Arnold
- Margaret Atwood
- W. H. Auden
- Margaret Avison
- Kofi Awoonor
- Imamu Amiri Baraka
- Anna Laetitia Barbauld
- James K. Baxter
- Aphra Behn
- John Berryman
- Earle Birney
- Elizabeth Bishop
- William Blake
- George Bowering
- Anne Bradstreet
- Dionne Brand
- Edward K. Brathwaite
- Emily Brontë
- Elizabeth Barrett Browning
- Robert Browning
- Basil Bunting
- Robert Burns
- Thomas Campion
- Bliss Carman
- Lewis Carroll
- Margaret Cavendish, Duchess of Newcastle
- Geoffrey Chaucer
- Lady Mary Chudleigh
- Arthur Hugh Clough
- Leonard Cohen
- Wanda Coleman
- Samuel Taylor Coleridge
- Jeni Couzyn
- William Cowper
- Isabella Valancy Crawford
- Robert Creeley
- Countee Cullen
- E. E. Cummings
- Allen Curnow
- Emily Dickinson
- H. D.
- John Donne
- John Dryden
- Richard Eberhart
- T. S. Eliot
- Ralph Waldo Emerson
- Nissim Ezekiel
- Anne Finch, Countess of Winchilsea
- Robert Frost
- Allen Ginsberg
- George Gordon, Lord Byron
- Robert Graves
- Thomas Gray
- Thomas Hardy
- Seamus Heaney
- George Herbert
- Robert Herrick
- Daryl Hine
- A. D. Hope
- Gerard Manley Hopkins
- A. E. Housman
- Henry Howard, Earl of Surrey
- Langston Hughes
- Ted Hughes
- Randall Jarrell
- Ben Jonson
- John Keats
- Rudyard Kipling
- Carolyn Kizer
- A. M. Klein
- Archibald Lampman
- Patrick Lane
- Philip Larkin
- D. H. Lawrence
- Irving Layton
- Mary Leapor
- Dennis Lee
- Douglas LePan
- Denise Levertov
- Dorothy Livesay
- Henry Wadsworth Longfellow
- Audre Lorde
- Robert Lowell
- Hugh MacDiarmid
- Gwendolyn MacEwen
- Kenneth Mackenzie
- Archibald MacLeish
- Louis MacNeice
- Jay Macpherson
- Daphne Marlatt
- Christopher Marlowe
- Andrew Marvell
- Herman Melville
- James Merrill
- Edna St. Vincent Millay
- John Milton
- Lady Mary Wortley Montagu
- Marianne Moore
- Susan Musgrave
- Arthur Nortje
- Alden Nowlan
- Michael Ondaatje
- Wilfred Owen
- P. K. Page
- Dorothy Parker
- Katherine Philips
- Marge Piercy
- Sylvia Plath
- Edgar Allan Poe
- Alexander Pope
- Peter Porter
- Ezra Pound
- E. J. Pratt
- Al Purdy
- Sir Walter Raleigh
- John Crowe Ransom
- Henry Reed
- Adrienne Rich
- Charles G. D. Roberts
- Judith Rodriguez
- Theodore Roethke
- Christina Rossetti
- Dante Gabriel Rossetti
- Siegfried Sassoon
- Duncan Scott Campbell
- F. R. Scott
- Robert W. Service
- Anne Sexton
- William Shakespeare
- Percy Bysshe Shelley
- Sir Philip Sidney
- Edith Sitwell
- Kenneth Slessor
- Christopher Smart
- Stevie Smith
- A. J. M. Smith
- W. D. Snodgrass
- Raymond Souster
- Stephen Spender
- Edmund Spenser
- William Stafford
- Wallace Stevens
- Jonathan Swift
- Alfred, Lord Tennyson
- Sharon Thesen
- Dylan Thomas
- Maxine Tynes
- Miriam Waddington
- Derek Walcott
- Tom Wayman
- Phyllis Webb
- Walt Whitman
- Richard Wilbur
- Anne Wilkinson
- William Carlos Williams
- William Wordsworth
- Judith Wright
- Lady Mary Wroth
- Sir Thomas Wyatt
- William Butler Yeats
- Patricia Young

== See also ==
- 1993 in poetry
- 1993 in literature
- American poetry
- Canadian poetry
- English poetry
- List of poetry anthologies
