= 1941 in poetry =

Nationality words link to articles with information on the nation's poetry or literature (for instance, Irish or France).

== Events ==
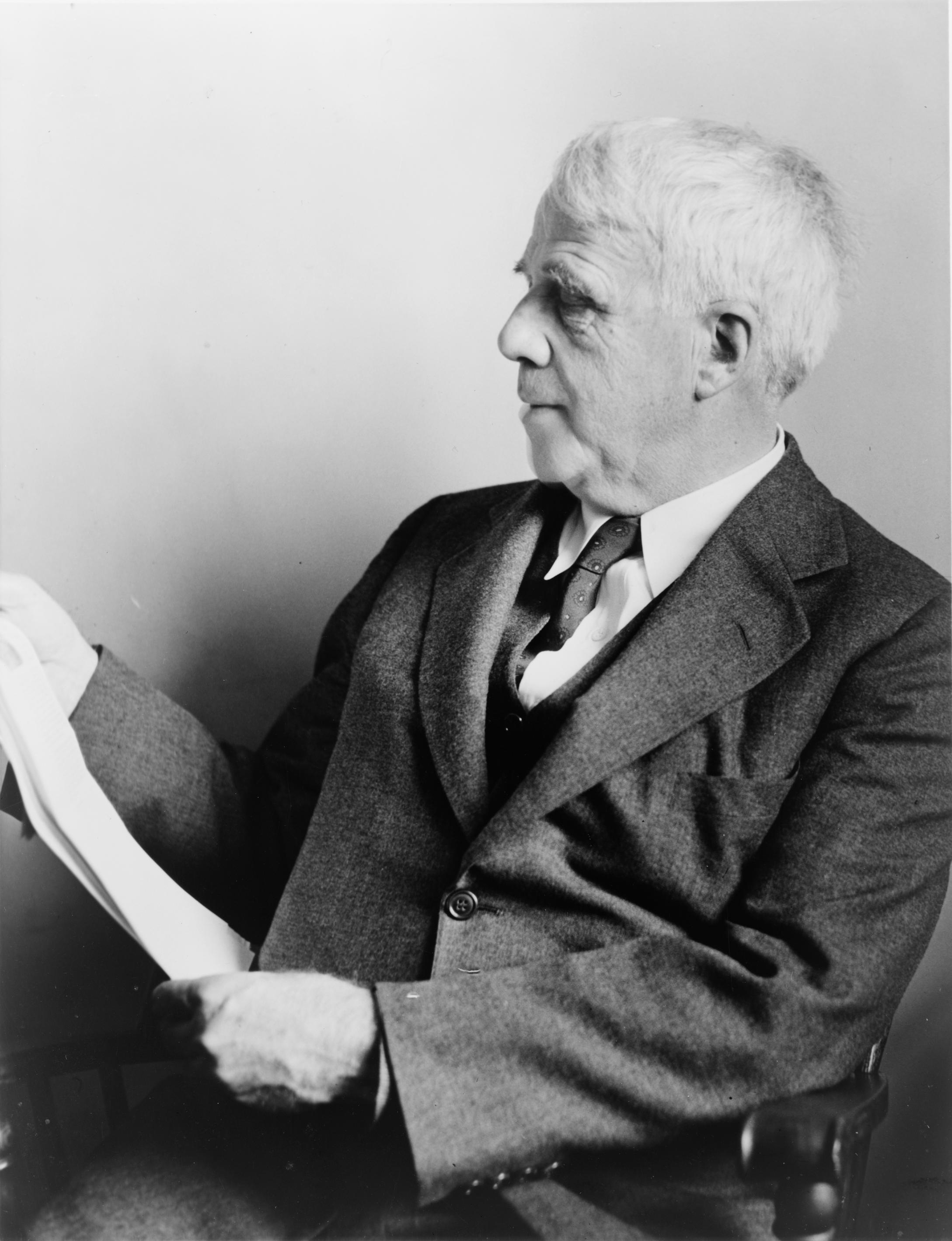
Robert Frost in 1941, the year he wins the Frost Medal

- January 20 – Chittadhar Hridaya begins a 6-year sentence of imprisonment in Kathmandu for writing poetry in Nepal Bhasa during which time he secretly composes his Buddhist epic Sugata Saurabha in the same language
- Spring
  - Tambimuttu's Poetry London publishes a special 'Poets in Uniform' issue.
  - The Antioch Review is founded as a literary magazine at Antioch College in Ohio
- May 5 – Kingsley Amis and Philip Larkin meet while both reading English at St John's College, Oxford
- August 18–19-year-old Pilot Officer John Gillespie Magee, Jr., American poet serving in Britain with the Royal Canadian Air Force (which he has joined before the United States has officially entered World War II), flies a high-altitude test flight in a Spitfire V from RAF Llandow in Wales and afterwards writes the sonnet "High Flight" about the experience (completed by September 3); on December 11 he dies in a collision over England
- September 6–7 – Under Nazi occupation, Yiddish poet Abraham Sutzkever is among the Polish Jews interned in the Vilna Ghetto. He will escape and join the resistance in 1943. During the Nazi era, Sutzkever writes over 80 poems, whose manuscripts he manages to save for postwar publication
- c. October – The first known reference to Babi Yar in poetry is written soon after the Babi Yar massacres by the young Jewish-Ukrainian poet from Kiev and an eyewitness, Liudmila Titova (Ukrainian: Людмила Титова). Her poem "Babi Yar" will be discovered only in the 1990s
- December – During the Siege of Leningrad, Yakov Druskin, ill and starving, and Maria Malich, the second wife of Russian avant-garde poet Danil Kharms (arrested this summer on suspicion of treason and imprisoned in the psychiatric ward at Leningrad Prison No. 1 where he will die in 1942), trudge across the city to Kharms' bombed-out apartment building and collect a trunk full of manuscripts which they hide through the 1940s and 1950s, even bringing them to Siberia, then covertly show them to others in the 1960s. Their actions save much of Kharms' work for posterity as well as that of fellow poet Alexander Vvedensky (of whom only about a quarter of his output survives). Vvedensky, arrested in September in Kharkov for "counterrevolutionary agitation", was evacuated but died of pleurisy en route
- The surrealist magazine VVV is founded in New York City by French poet André Breton and Marcel Duchamp, Max Ernst and David Hare

== Works published in English ==
Listed by nation where the work was first published and again by the poet's native land, if different; substantially revised works listed separately:

=== Canada ===
- Anne Marriott, Calling Adventurers!, Toronto: Ryerson Press.
- E. J. Pratt, Dunkirk, Toronto: Macmillan.
- Bertram Warr, Yet a Little Onwards, Broadsheet No. 3, Resurgam Younger Poets series, Favil Press.

=== India, in English ===
- Sri Aurobindo, Poems ( Poetry in English ), Hyderabad: Government Central Press
- Bimal Chandra Bose, Thought-Ray ( Poetry in English ), Calcutta: Biman Panthi Publishing House
- Baldoon Dhingra, Comes Ever the Dawn ( Poetry in English ), Lahore: Ripon Press
- Manjeri Sundaraman, Brief Orisons ( Poetry in English ), Madras: Hurley Press
- Meary James Thurairajah Tambimuttu, editor, Out of This War ( Poetry in English ), London: Fortune Press; anthology; Indian poetry published in the United Kingdom
- Hariprasad Sastri, editor and translator, Indian Mystic Verse, (3rd revised and enlarged edition 1984) anthology

=== United Kingdom ===
- W. H. Auden, New Year Letter (sometimes incorrectly called New Year Letters, with an "s"), May (published as The Double Man in the United States in March), English poet living in the United States
- Laurence Binyon, The North Star, and Other Poems
- Edmund Blunden, Poems 1930–1940
- Lilian Bowes Lyon, Tomorrow is a Revealing
- T. S. Eliot, The Dry Salvages, published in New English Weekly, republished in Four Quartets, 1944
- A Choice of Kipling's Verse by T. S. Eliot, published December 1941
- G. S. Fraser, The Fatal Landscape and Other Poems
- Robert Greacen, The Bird, Northern Ireland poet
- J. F. Hendry and Henry Treece, editors, The White Horseman, poetry anthology featuring poets in the New Apocalyptics movement
- Louis MacNeice, Plant and Phantom
- John Pudney, "For Johnny"
- Keidrych Rhys, editor, Poems from the Forces: a collection of verses by serving members of the Navy, Army and Air Force
- W. R. Rodgers, Awake! and Other Poems, Northern Ireland poet
- Alan Ross, Summer Thunder
- A. L. Rowse, Poems of a Decade
- Sydney Goodsir Smith, Skail Wind, in Scots and English
- Meary James Thurairajah Tambimuttu, editor, Out of This War, London: Fortune Press; anthology; Indian poetry in English, published in the United Kingdom
- Terence Tiller, Poems, New Hogarth Library 5
- Vernon Watkins, The Ballad of the Mari Lwyd, and Other Poems

=== United States ===
- W. H. Auden, The Double Man, published in March; later published as New Year Letter in the United Kingdom in May; English poet living in the United States
- Stephen Vincent Benét, A Summons to the Free
- John Peale Bishop, Selected Poems
- Louise Bogan, Poems and New Poems
- Paul Engle, West of Midnight
- Kenneth Fearing, Dagger of the Mind
- John Gould Fletcher, South Star
- Robinson Jeffers, Be Angry at the Sun
- Edgar Lee Masters, Illinois Poems
- Josephine Miles, Poems on Several Occasions
- Edna St. Vincent Millay, Collected Sonnets
- Marianne Moore, What Are Years
- John G. Neihardt, The Song of Jed Smith
- Carl Rakosi, Selected Poems
- John Crowe Ransom, The New Criticism, criticism
- Charles Reznikoff, Going To and Fro and Walking Up and Down, self-published
- Theodore Roethke, Open House
- Winfield Townley Scott, Wind the Clock
- Ridgely Torrence, Poems
- Mark Van Doren, The Mayfield Deer
- William Carlos Williams, The Broken Span
- Louis Zukofsky, 55 Poems

=== Other in English ===
- Allen Curnow, Island Time (Caxton), New Zealand
- Lesbia Harford (d. 1927), The Poems of Lesbia Harford, Australia
- Rex Ingamells and John Ingamells, At a Boundary, Adelaide, written by two brothers, includes Reginald Ingamells' "The Gangrened People", Australia
- Donagh MacDonagh, Veterans, and other poems, Ireland
- R. A. K. Mason, The Dark Will Lighten, New Zealand

== Works published in other languages ==
Listed by nation where the work was first published and again by the poet's native land, if different; substantially revised works listed separately:

=== France ===
- Louis Aragon, Le Creve-Coeur
- Paul Éluard, pen name of Eugène Grindel, Le Livre ouvert, published from 1940 to this year
- Luc Estang, Puissance du matin
- Léon-Paul Fargue, Haute Solitude

=== Indian subcontinent ===
Including all of the British colonies that later became India, Pakistan, Bangladesh, Sri Lanka and Nepal. Listed alphabetically by first name, regardless of surname:

==== Hindi ====
- Girija Kumar Mathur, Manjir, Indian, Hindi
- Sumitra Kumari Sinha, Vihag, Hindi
- Syed Kalbe Mustapha, Malik Muhammad Ja'isi, biography in Urdu of Malik Mohammad Jaisi, a Hindi poet of the 15th century, with descriptions of the poet's works

==== Other languages on the Indian subcontinent ====
- Abanindranath Tagore and Rani Chanda, a memoir describing the lives of the family that included Rabindranath Tagore; a companion volume to Joda Sakor Dhare 1944 and Apan Katha 1946; Bengali
- Ananta Pattanayak, Tarpana Kare Aji, Indian, Oriya-language
- Baidyanath Mishra, also known as "Yatri", a dramatic monologue given by a child-widow character, told in colloquial language, a new development in Maithili poetry
- Bawa Balwant, Maha Nac, Punjabi-language poems inspired by Marxist and left-leaning politics
- Darshan Singh Awara, Main Bagi Han, Punjabi-language poems reflecting anger toward society as well as religious traditions and institutions
- Dimbeswar Neog, Svahid Karbala, Assamese-language narrative poem on a tragedy at Karbala and the martyrdom of Hussain
- Jyotsna Shukla, Akashnan Phool, Indian poet writing in Gujarati
- Faiz Ahmad Faiz, Naqsh-e-Faryadi, Indian, Urdu-language
- Hari Daryani, Hariscandra Jivana Katha, Sindhi-language (India)
- M. U. Malkani, Gitanjali, translation into Sindhi from the English of Rabindranath Thakur's book of the same name
- Mohammad Mumtaz Ali, Amir Minasi, biography of the Urdu poet Amir Minai (1828–1900), including descriptions of Minai's works; written in Urdu
- Narayan Bezbarua, Sakti Singa, Indian, Assamese
- Pritam Singh Safir, Kattak Kunjam, Indian, Punjabi-language
- Sri Chandra Singh, "Vadali", a Rajasthani-language nature poem in 130 verses which influenced Rajasthani poets for a generation
- Wahab Pare of Hajin, Kashmiri Shahnama Firdosi, an adaptation in Kashmiri of the Persian classic poem by Firdousi; with a canto added at the end

=== Spanish language ===
- José Santos Chocano, Oro de Indias, Peru
- Gerardo Diego, Alondra de verdad ("True Lark"), 42 sonnets on diverse topics; Spain
- Federico García Lorca, Diván del Tamarit (Spanish for "The Diván of Tamarit", written in 1936, published posthumously this year; Spain
- Gabriela Mistral, Antología: Selección de Gabriela Mistral, Santiago, Chile: Zig Zag

=== Other ===
- Amir Hamzah, Buah Rindu, Dutch East Indies
- Pier Paolo Pasolini, Versi a Casarsa, Friulian poetry published in Italy
- Nima Yooshij, "Quqnūs", Iran

== Awards and honors ==
- Governor General's Award, poetry or drama: Calling Adventurers, Anne Marriott (Canada)

=== United States ===
- Frost Medal: Robert Frost
- Pulitzer Prize for Poetry: Leonard Bacon: Sunderland Capture

== Births ==
Death years link to the corresponding "[year] in poetry" article:

- February 7 – Kevin Crossley-Holland, English poet and children's author
- February 19 – Stephen Dobyns, American poet and novelist
- March 1 – Robert Hass, American poet
- March 13 – Mahmoud Darwish (died 2008), Palestinian poet
- March 21 – Abdulla Oripov (died 2016), Uzbek poet and statesman
- March 22 – Billy Collins, American poet who served two terms as the 44th Poet Laureate of the United States (2001–2003)
- April 12 – Toi Derricotte, American poet
- April 18 – Michael D. Higgins, Irish President, academic and poet
- April 29 (probable date) – Yusef Komunyakaa, American poet, academic and recipient of the 1994 Kingsley Tufts Poetry Award and 1995 Pulitzer Prize for Poetry
- May 17 – Lyn Hejinian, American poet, essayist, translator and publisher often associated with the Language poets
- May 24 – Bob Dylan (Robert Allen Zimmerman), American singer-songwriter and recipient of the 2016 Nobel Prize in Literature
- May 27 – Simon J. Ortiz, Native American poet and writer associated with the Native American Renaissance
- August 4 – Robert Grenier, American poet essayist, and editor often associated with the Language poets
- September 1 – Gwendolyn MacEwen (died 1987), Canadian novelist and poet
- September 15 – Lindsay Barrett, Jamaican novelist, poet and journalist
- October 2 – John Sinclair, American poet jailed in 1969 after selling two joints to undercover narcotics officers; in 1971 his case receives international attention when John Lennon performs at a benefit concert on his behalf
- October 13 – John Snow, English cricketer and poet
- October 20 – Stewart Parker (died 1988), Northern Irish poet and playwright
- October 27 – Rodolfo Hinostroza (died 2016), Peruvian poet, writer, journalist, food critic and astrologer
- November 8 – David MacLeod Black, South African-born Scots poet
- November 15 – Heathcote Williams (died 2017), English poet, political activist, film actor and dramatist
- November 23 – Derek Mahon (died 2020), Irish poet
- November 29 – Lloyd Schwartz, American poet
- December 14 – Rachel Blau DuPlessis, American poet, essayist, critic and academic
- December 16 – Poldy Bird (died 2018), Argentinian poet
- date not known:
  - Jonathan Holden, American poet and academic
  - Jeremy Hooker, English poet, critic, lecturer and broadcaster
  - John Mole, English poet
  - William Pitt Root, American poet
  - Gibbons Ruark, American poet
  - Stephen Yenser, American poet

== Deaths ==
Birth years link to the corresponding "[year] in poetry" article:

- January 6 – F. R. Higgins (born 1896), Irish poet
- January 13 – James Joyce, 58 (born 1882), Irish novelist and poet
- January 23 – John Oxenham (William Arthur Dunkerley, born 1852), English novelist and poet
- February 5 – A. B. (`Banjo') Paterson (born 1864), Australian bush poet, journalist and author
- March 13 – Elizabeth Madox Roberts (born 1880), American novelist and poet
- April 4 – Parvin E'tesami (born 1907), Persian poet, typhoid
- May 2 – Ibrahim Touqan إبراهيم طوقان (born 1905), Palestinian, Arab-language poet
- May 19 – Lola Ridge (born 1873), American anarchist poet, editor of avant-garde, feminist and Marxist publications
- June 15 – Evelyn Underhill (born 1875), English poet
- August 7 – Rabindranath Tagore, 80 (born 1861), Bengali poet in India, Brahmo Samaj (syncretic Hindu monotheist) philosopher, visual artist, playwright, composer and novelist whose works reshaped Bengali literature and music in the late 19th and early 20th centuries (1913 winner of the Nobel Prize in Literature)
- August 31 – Marina Tsvetaeva (born 1892), Soviet Russian poet, suicide by hanging
- September 1 – Jiří Orten (born 1919), Czech poet
- c. October? – Alexander Vvedensky (born 1904), Russian poet (see Events section above)
- October 1 – Aline Murray Kilmer (born 1888), American poet and children's writer
- October 10 – Timothy Corsellis (born 1921), English poet, killed in military aircraft accident
- October 16 – Sergei Efron (born 1893), Soviet Russian poet and secret police operative, executed
- October 17 – May Ziadeh (born 1886), Lebanese-Palestinian poet, essayist and translator
- November 18 – Émile Nelligan (born 1879), Canadian French language poet

== See also ==
- Poetry
- List of poetry awards
- List of years in poetry
