= 1958 Governor General's Awards =

Canadian literary award

In Canada, the 1958 Governor General's Awards for Literary Merit were the twenty-second such awards. The awards in this period were an honour for the authors but had no monetary prize.

== Winners ==
- Fiction: Colin McDougall, Execution.
- Poetry or Drama: James Reaney, A Suit of Nettles.
- Non-Fiction: Pierre Berton, Klondike.
- Non-Fiction: Joyce Hemlow, The History of Fanny Burney.
- Juvenile: Edith L. Sharp, Nkwala.
