= The Harvill Book of Twentieth-Century Poetry in English =

Poetry anthology

The Harvill Book of Twentieth-Century Poetry in English is a poetry anthology edited by Michael Schmidt, and published in 1999. Schmidt is an American academic and long-term UK resident, who is the founder of Carcanet Press; he has also written extensive biographical books about poets.

A paperback edition was issued in London by Harvill Press in 2000 with ISBN 1-86046-735-0.

== Poets in The Harvill Book of Twentieth-Century Poetry in English ==
These 117 poets are represented in the anthology:

- Simon Armitage
- John Ash
- John Ashbery
- W. H. Auden
- George Barker
- James K. Baxter
- Patricia Beer
- John Berryman
- John Betjeman
- Sujata Bhatt
- Elizabeth Bishop
- Eavan Boland
- Kamau Brathwaite
- Basil Bunting
- Gillian Clarke
- David Constantine
- Wendy Cope
- Hart Crane
- E. E. Cummings
- Allen Curnow
- Donald Davie
- H. D.
- Mark Doty
- Keith Douglas
- Carol Ann Duffy
- Robert Duncan
- T. S. Eliot
- William Empson
- Elaine Feinstein
- James Fenton
- Roy Fisher
- Veronica Forrest-Thomson
- Robert Frost
- Allen Ginsberg
- Louise Glück
- Jorie Graham
- W. S. Graham
- Robert Graves
- Ivor Gurney
- Sophie Hannah
- Thomas Hardy
- Tony Harrison
- Gwen Harwood
- Seamus Heaney
- Geoffrey Hill
- Michael Hofmann
- A. D. Hope
- A. E. Housman
- Langston Hughes
- Ted Hughes
- Randall Jarrell
- Robinson Jeffers
- Elizabeth Jennings
- David Jones
- Patrick Kavanagh
- Thomas Kinsella
- Rudyard Kipling
- R. F. Langley
- Philip Larkin
- D. H. Lawrence
- Gwyneth Lewis
- Robert Lowell
- Mina Loy
- Norman MacCaig
- Hugh MacDiarmid
- Sorley MacLean
- Louis MacNeice
- Derek Mahon
- Bill Manhire
- Glyn Maxwell
- James Merrill
- Charlotte Mew
- Christopher Middleton
- Edna St. Vincent Millay
- Robert Minhinnick
- Marianne Moore
- Edwin Morgan
- Andrew Motion
- Edwin Muir
- Paul Muldoon
- Les Murray
- Lorine Niedecker
- Frank O'Hara
- Charles Olson
- George Oppen
- Wilfred Owen
- Michael Palmer
- John Peck
- Robert Pinsky
- Sylvia Plath
- Ezra Pound
- F. T. Prince
- John Crowe Ransom
- Henry Reed
- Adrienne Rich
- Laura Riding
- Theodore Roethke
- Isaac Rosenberg
- E. J. Scovell
- Peter Scupham
- Burns Singer
- C. H. Sisson
- Iain Crichton Smith
- Stevie Smith
- Stephen Spender
- Wallace Stevens
- Dylan Thomas
- Edward Thomas
- R. S. Thomas
- Charles Tomlinson
- Jeffrey Wainwright
- Derek Walcott
- Richard Wilbur
- William Carlos Williams
- Yvor Winters
- Judith Wright
- W. B. Yeats

== See also ==
- 2000 in poetry
- 2000 in literature
- 20th century in literature
- 20th century in poetry
- American poetry
- English poetry
- List of poetry anthologies
