= Joyce Hemlow =

Canadian professor and writer

- Born: July 31, 1906; Liscomb, Nova Scotia, Canada
- Died: September 3, 2001 (aged 95); Halifax, Nova Scotia, Canada
- Awards: Guggenheim Fellowship; James Tait Black Memorial Prize; Governor General's Award for Academic Non-Fiction in 1958; Rose Mary Crawshay Prize

Academic background
- Education: Queen's University; Radcliffe College

Academic work
- Discipline: English literature
- Institutions: McGill University
- Main interests: Burneys, especially Frances Burney

Joyce Hemlow FRSC (July 31, 1906 – September 3, 2001) was a Canadian professor and award-winning writer.

== Biography ==
Joyce Hemlow was born on July 31, 1906 in Liscomb, Nova Scotia. Her parents were William and Rosalinda (Redmond) Hemlow. She was educated at Queen's University where she received a B.A. in 1941 and an M.A. in 1942, becoming a travelling fellow of the university until 1943, when she became a fellow of the Canadian Federation of University Women. She then attended Radcliffe College in the United States, gaining an A.M. in 1944 and a PhD in 1948. In 1951, she became a Guggenheim Memorial Foundation Fellow, and, in the summer of 1954, a Nuffeld Fellow.

She taught English literature at McGill University for most of her career, beginning in 1945, and became the Greenshields Professor of English Language and Literature at McGill in 1965. She also served from 1957 to 1961 as a member of the Humanities Research Council of Canada. Her literary output mainly concerned the Burneys, especially the novelist Frances Burney, best profiled in her award-winning book The History of Fanny Burney, which received the James Tait Black Memorial Prize, the Governor General's Award for Academic Non-Fiction in 1958, and the Rose Mary Crawshay Prize. A small collection of her papers at McGill University documents her teaching activities.

She was a member of Phi Beta Kappa and was a Protestant.

== Awards and honours ==
- James Tait Black Memorial Prize
- Governor General's Award for Academic Non-Fiction in 1958
- Rose Mary Crawshay Prize
