= The Firing Squad (Four Star Playhouse) =

- Four Star Playhouse episode
- Episode no.: Season 4 Episode 1
- Directed by: Robert Florey
- Teleplay by: Frederick Brady
- Based on: a novel Execution by Colin McDougall
- Original air date: 6 October 1955
- Running time: 25 mins

Guest appearance
- David Niven

"The Firing Squad" is a 1955 episode of the TV series Four Star Playhouse. It was based on the classic Canadian novel Execution. It was relocated to be set in the Australian army in World War Two, one of the rare depictions of Australia in Hollywood at the time.

== Plot ==
In World War Two, a disgraced officer, Captain Adams, is ordered to lead a firing squad to execute a deserter, Jones who has been accused of murder. Jones is generally agreed to be innocent, but the army have decided to shoot him as an example.

== Cast ==
- David Niven as Adams
- John Dehner as Gen. Hatfield
- Hugh Beaumont as Padre
- Michael Pate as Sgt. Gibbons
- Jon Shepodd as Pvt. Jones
- Tom Powers as Gen. Vincent
- John Warburton as Col. Ramsey

== Production ==
In the Los Angeles Times Niven describes his character as Canadian. But in the final play his character is Australian.
