= Liscomb, Nova Scotia =

Community in Nova Scotia, Canada

Coordinates: 45°1′25″N 62°0′20″W

Liscomb in Nova Scotia

Liscomb is a small community in the Canadian province of Nova Scotia, located in the Municipality of the District of Saint Mary's in Guysborough County. The population of Liscomb is 52. Liscomb lies along the Marine Drive on Trunk 7, approximately 17 kilometres (11 mi) southwest of Sherbrooke.

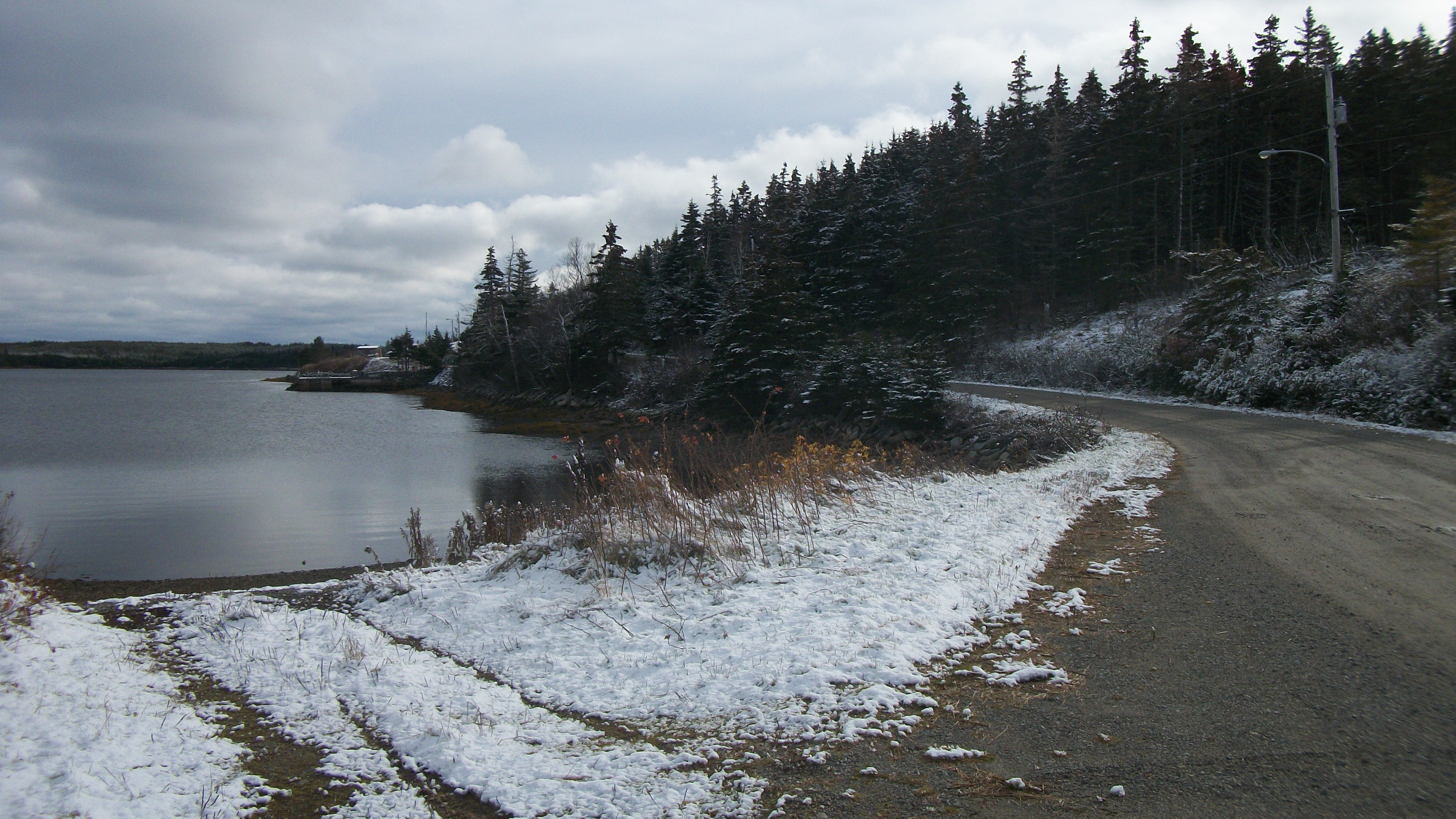
Spanish Ship Bay in Liscomb, as viewed from MacKinley Point Road.

== Notable people ==
- Joyce Hemlow (1906–2001), professor and author
