= Statue of Al Purdy =

Memorial in Toronto, Ontario, Canada

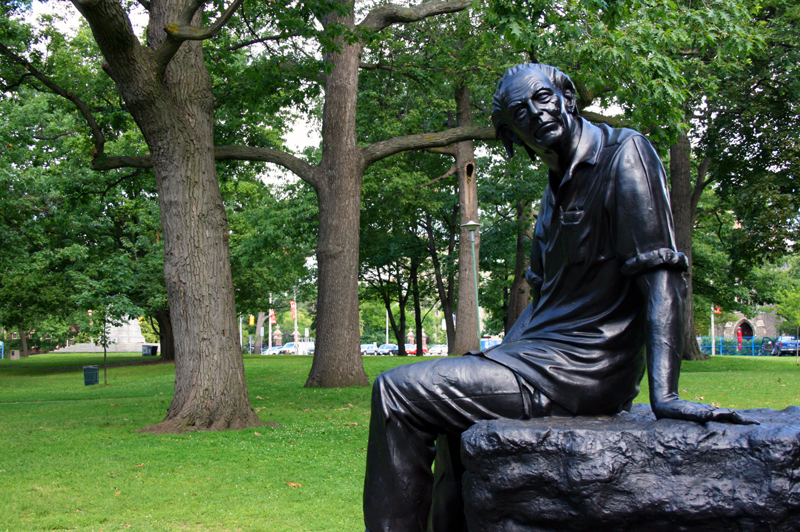
- The memorial in 2008
- Subject: Al Purdy
- Location: Toronto, Ontario, Canada; 43°39′55.1″N 79°23′30.6″W

A statue of Al Purdy, sometimes called the Al Purdy Memorial, is installed in Toronto's Queen's Park, in Ontario, Canada. The sculpture was created by Edwin and Veronica Dam de Nogales, and unveiled in 2008.
