= The Penguin Book of Contemporary British Poetry =

1982 poetry anthology

The Penguin Book of Contemporary British Poetry is a poetry anthology edited by Blake Morrison and Andrew Motion, and published in 1982 by Penguin Books.

Shortly after its publication, Morrison acknowledged the criticisms made towards the anthology, including that it was "merely 'fashionable'" and the "committee English" of its introduction. Poets in the 1962 Al Alvarez anthology, The New Poetry, were excluded. The inclusion of Seamus Heaney (who, although born in Northern Ireland, held a Republic of Ireland passport) led to him to deliver a riposte in his poem, An Open Letter (1983):

"Don't be surprised if I demur, for, be advised
My passport's green.
No glass of ours was ever raised
To toast The Queen."

Poets included in the book were Anne Stevenson, Carol Rumens, Christopher Reid, Craig Raine, David Sweetman, Derek Mahon, Douglas Dunn, Fleur Adcock, Hugo Williams, James Fenton, Jeffrey Wainwright, Medbh McGuckian, Michael Longley, Paul Muldoon, Penelope Shuttle, Peter Scupham, Seamus Heaney, Tom Paulin, and Tony Harrison.
