= Elise Paschen =

American poet and member of the Osage Nation

- Born: 1959 (age 66–67); Chicago, Illinois
- Occupations: Poet, Professor
- Parent(s): Maria Tallchief and Henry D. Paschen
- Website: http://www.elisepaschen.com

Elise Paschen is an American poet and member of the Osage Nation. She is the co-founder and co-editor of Poetry in Motion, a program which places poetry posters in subways and buses across the country.

== Career and education ==
The daughter of renowned prima ballerina Maria Tallchief and Chicago contractor Henry D. Paschen, she was born and raised in Chicago, Illinois, where she attended the Francis W. Parker School. Paschen is a member of the Osage Nation.

While an undergraduate at Harvard University, Paschen received the Lloyd McKim Garrison Medal for poetry, and served as Poetry Editor of the Harvard Advocate. At Oxford University, where she received her M.Phil. and D.Phil. degrees in 20th Century British and American Literature, she co-edited Oxford Poetry.

Executive Director of the Poetry Society of America from 1988 until 2001, she has edited numerous anthologies, including the New York Times bestsellers Poetry Speaks. Her books of poetry include, most recently, Blood Wolf Moon (winner of the Oklahoma Book Award in Poetry and the Foreword Indie Book of the Year Award in Poetry) as well as Tallchief, The Nightlife, Bestiary, Infidelities ( winner of the Nicholas Roerich Poetry Prize) and Houses: Coasts. Her poems have been published in numerous magazines and anthologies including The New Yorker, Poetry and The Best American Poetry. Her poem "Wi’-gi-e" was credited as inspiration for the title of the non-fiction book Killers of the Flower Moon (2017), which contained her poem and was adapted into the 2023 film of the same name.

Paschen teaches in the MFA Writing Program at the School of the Art Institute of Chicago.

== Awards ==
- Foreword Indie Book of the Year Award in Poetry, for Blood Wolf Moon
- Oklahoma Book Award in Poetry, for Blood Wolf Moon
- Nicholas Roerich Poetry Prize, for Infidelities
- Lloyd McKim Garrison Medal for poetry
- Joan Grey Untermyer Poetry Prize
- Richard Selig Poetry Prize
- Frances C. Allen Fellowship

== Works ==
- Houses: Coasts (Sycamore Press, Oxford, 1986)
- Infidelities (Story Line Press, 1996)
- Bestiary (Red Hen Press, 2009)
- The Nightlife (Red Hen Press, 2017)
- Tallchief (Magic City Books Press, 2023)
- Blood Wolf Moon: Poems (Red Hen Press, 2025)

=== Anthologies featuring her poems ===
- Reinventing the Enemy’s Language: Contemporary Native Women’s Writings of North America (1997)
- Ravishing DisUnities: Real Ghazals in English (2000)
- The POETRY Anthology, 1912—2002 (2002)
- A Formal Feeling Comes: Poems in Form by Contemporary Women (2007)
- Ghost Fishing: An Eco-Justice Poetry Anthology (University of Georgia Press, 2018)
- When the Light of the World Was Subdued, Our Songs Came Through: A Norton Anthology of Native Nations Poetry (2020)
- Best American Poetry (2018, 2025)
- A Century of Poetry in The New Yorker (1925-2025)

=== Editor or co-editor ===
- Poetry in Motion (1996)
- Poetry Speaks (2001)
- Poetry in Motion from Coast to Coast (2002)
- Poetry Speaks to Children (2005)
- Poetry Speaks Expanded (2007)
- Poetry Speaks Who I Am (2010)
- The Eloquent Poem (2019)
