= American Poetry Since 1950 =

American Poetry Since 1950: Innovators and Outsiders
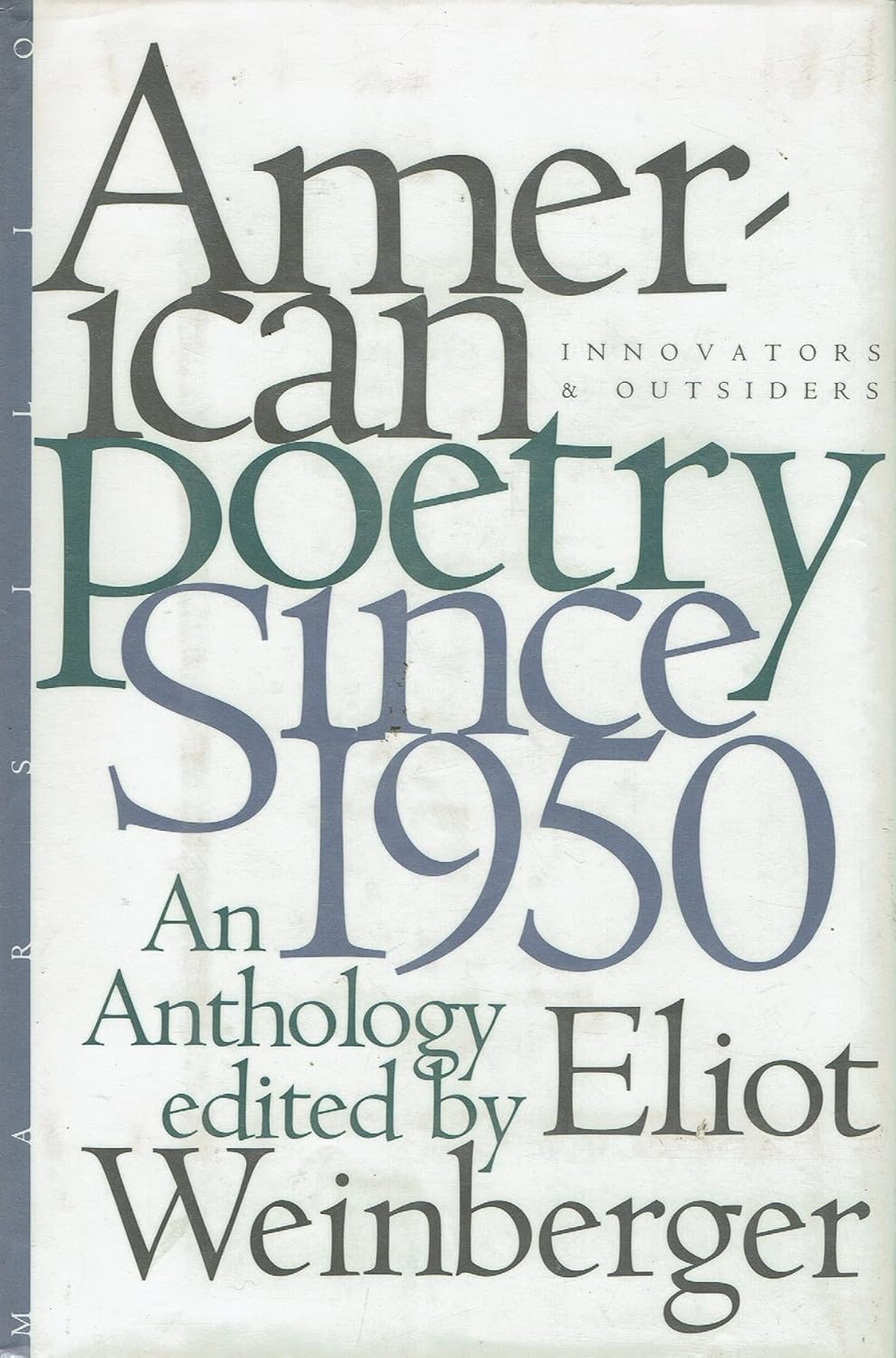
- Author: Eliot Weinberger
- Subject: Poetry
- Published: 1993
- Publisher: Marsilio Publishers

American Poetry Since 1950: Innovators and Outsiders is a 1993 poetry anthology edited by Eliot Weinberger. First published by Marsilio Publishers, it joined two other collections which appeared at that time: From the Other Side of the Century: A New American Poetry, 1960-1990 (1994; edited by Douglas Messerli) and Postmodern American Poetry, a 1994 poetry anthology edited by Paul Hoover. These three anthologies were perhaps seeking to be for their time what Donald Allen's anthology, The New American Poetry (Grove Press, 1960), was for the 1960s.

"In the case of these anthologists [Weinberger, Messerli, and Hoover], it is a nostalgia predicated on a “recuperation” of New American poetic dissidents, but the logic is flawed because they’ve come too late to get in on the fruits of first acclaim. All aspire to huddle with Donald Allen . . . "

Jed Rasula

Weinberger chooses thirty-five "innovators and outsiders," all of them from the U.S.. As in the two Donald Allen anthologies of The New American Poetry, no poets from other English-speaking countries are included. Weinberger's two principles of inclusion are (1) only poems first published in book form since 1950 and (2) no poets born after World War II.

== Poets included in American Poetry Since 1950 ==
The following is a chronological list (from the year of the poet's birth). William Carlos Williams, listed here first, was born in 1883. Michael Palmer, listed here last, was born in 1943. This chronological listing differs slightly from the order of each poet's appearance in the anthology itself, which opens with Charles Olson's poem "The Kingfishers", a poem that made its first appearance in 1950.

William Carlos Williams -- Ezra Pound -- H.D. -- Charles Reznikoff -- Langston Hughes -- Lorine Niedecker -- Louis Zukofsky -- Kenneth Rexroth -- George Oppen -- Charles Olson -- William Everson -- John Cage -- Muriel Rukeyser -- William Bronk -- Robert Duncan -- Jackson Mac Low -- Denise Levertov-- Jack Spicer -- Paul Blackburn -- Robert Creeley -- Allen Ginsberg -- Frank O'Hara -- John Ashbery -- Nathaniel Tarn -- Gary Snyder -- Jerome Rothenberg -- David Antin -- Amiri Baraka -- Clayton Eshleman -- Ronald Johnson -- Robert Kelly -- Gustaf Sobin -- Susan Howe -- Clark Coolidge -- Michael Palmer

== See also ==
- 1993 in poetry
- 1993 in literature
- American poetry
- List of poetry anthologies
