= Faber Book of Modern American Verse =

Poetry anthology

First edition

The Faber Book of Modern American Verse was a poetry anthology edited by W. H. Auden, and published in London in 1956 by Faber and Faber. Auden had moved from the UK to the United States in 1939, and had been directly involved in the American poetry scene, particularly through his time spent on the Yale Younger Poets.

== Poets in the Faber Book of Modern American Verse ==
- Léonie Adams
- James Agee
- Conrad Aiken
- Stephen Vincent Benét
- John Berryman
- Elizabeth Bishop
- John Peale Bishop
- Richard Blackmur
- Louise Bogan
- James Broughton
- Witter Bynner
- Tristram Coffin
- Hart Crane
- Stephen Crane
- E. E. Cummings
- H. D.
- Edwin Denby
- Robert Duncan
- Richard Eberhart
- Paul Engle
- Robert Fitzgerald
- John Gould Fletcher
- Robert Francis
- Robert Frost
- W. Walker Gibson (1919-2009)
- Samuel Greenberg
- Horace Gregory
- Howard Griffin (1915-1975)
- Anthony Hecht
- John Holmes
- Robert Horan
- Rolfe Humphries
- Randall Jarrell
- Robinson Jeffers
- Chester Kallman
- Stanley Kunitz
- Janet Lewis
- Vachel Lindsay
- Robert Lowell
- Phyllis McGinley
- Archibald MacLeish
- Don Marquis
- Edgar Lee Masters
- Thomas Merton
- Josephine Miles
- Edna St. Vincent Millay
- Marianne Moore
- Merrill Moore
- Samuel French Morse
- Ogden Nash
- Dorothy Parker
- Kenneth Patchen
- Ezra Pound
- Dachine Rainer
- John Crowe Ransom
- Kenneth Rexroth
- Edwin Arlington Robinson
- Theodore Roethke
- Carl Sandburg
- Delmore Schwartz
- Winfield Townley Scott
- Karl Shapiro
- Theodore Spencer
- Gertrude Stein
- Wallace Stevens
- Trumbull Stickney
- Allen Tate
- Louis Untermeyer
- Mark Van Doren
- Peter Viereck
- José Garcia Villa
- Robert Penn Warren
- John Hall Wheelock
- John Brooks Wheelwright
- Richard Wilbur
- Oscar Williams
- William Carlos Williams
- Edmund Wilson
- Yvor Winters
- Elinor Wylie
- Marya Zaturenska

== See also ==
- 1956 in poetry
- 1956 in literature
- American poetry
- English poetry
- List of poetry anthologies
