= Anne Wilkinson (poet) =

Canadian poet and writer (1910–1961)

- Born: Anne Cochran Gibbons; September 21, 1910; Toronto, Ontario
- Died: May 10, 1961 (aged 50); Toronto, Ontario
- Resting place: Roches Point, Ontario
- Occupation: Poet
- Relatives: Sir Edmund Boyd Osler (1845-1924) (maternal grandfather)
- Writing career
- Language: English
- Genre: Poetry

Anne Cochran Wilkinson (September 21, 1910 – May 10, 1961) was a Canadian poet and writer. She was part of the modernist movement in Canadian poetry in the 1940s and 1950s, one of only a few prominent women poets of the time, along with Dorothy Livesay and P. K. Page.

== Early life ==
Wilkinson was born Anne Gibbons in Toronto, Ontario, at Craigleigh, the Rosedale home of her maternal grandfather, the banker and Ontario politician Sir Edmund Boyd Osler. The middle child of Mary Osler and lawyer George Gibbons, she grew up in privileged society in London, Ontario and, after her father's early death from multiple sclerosis in 1919, in Toronto and California, and at her grandfather's country estate at Roches Point on Lake Simcoe.

== Career ==
By 1946, several of Wilkinson's poems had appeared in literary journals, and subsequently she published two collections of poetry, Counterpoint to Sleep (1951) and The Hangman Ties the Holly (1955), the latter of which was flagged by Northrup Frye as a volume of "poetry of particular importance" that year. She also published two books of prose before her untimely death from lung cancer in 1961: Lions in the Way (1956), a history of her maternal family, the Oslers, and Swann and Daphne (1960), a modern fairy tale for children. A founding editor and patron of the literary quarterly The Tamarack Review, her work appeared in several prominent Canadian publications of the day, including Northern Review. It was anthologized in The Oxford Book of Canadian Verse (ed. A.J.M. Smith, 1960), The Penguin Book of Canadian Verse (ed. Ralph Gustafson, 1975), Canadian Poetry 1920 to 1960 (ed. Brian Terhearne, 2010, was broadcast on CBC Radio's Anthology, and was recorded on the album Six Toronto Poets, alongside the poems of W.W.E. Ross, Raymond Souster, Margaret Avison, James Reaney and Jay Macpherson.

Her close friend A. J. M. Smith edited and introduced The Collected Poems of Anne Wilkinson and a Prose Memoir, which was posthumously published in 1968. Her writing was celebrated by artist/filmmaker Joyce Wieland and author Michael Ondaatje, and set to music by composer Oskar Morawetz. In the early 1990s it was re-examined by Joan Coldwell, who edited a new edition of the poems, as well as a volume of Wilkinson's autobiographical writings.

Wilkinson's work has enjoyed a revival since the publication in 2003 of Heresies: The Complete Poems of Anne Wilkinson, 1924–1961, edited by Dean Irvine, with appearances and discussion in more recent anthologies such as An Anthology of Canadian Literature in English, Modern Canadian Poets, Wider Boundaries of Daring: The Modernist Impulse in Canadian Women's Poetry, and Earth and Heaven, An Anthology of Myth Poetry.

== Selected works ==
=== Poetry ===
- Counterpoint to Sleep. Montreal: First Statement Press, 1951.
- The Hangman Ties the Holly. Toronto: Macmillan, 1955.
- The Collected Poems of Anne Wilkinson and a Prose Memoir, ed. A.J.M. Smith. Toronto: Macmillan, 1968.
- The Poetry of Anne Wilkinson and a Prose Memoir, ed. Joan Coldwell. Toronto: Exile Editions, 1990.
- Heresies: The Complete Poems of Anne Wilkinson, 1924–1961, ed. Dean Irvine. Montreal: Véhicule Press, 2003.
- The Essential Anne Wilkinson - poems, ed. Ingrid Ruthig. Erin: The Porcupine's Quill, 2014.

=== Prose ===
- Lions in the Way: A Discursive History of the Oslers. Toronto: Macmillan, 1956.
- Swann and Daphne, a children's story. Toronto: Oxford University Press, 1960.
- The Tightrope Walker: Autobiographical Writings of Anne Wilkinson, ed. Joan Coldwell. Toronto: University of Toronto Press, 1992.

=== Other ===
- Elegy: Voice and Piano, music Oskar Morawetz, words Anne Wilkinson. Aneneas Music, 1989.
