= Blake Morrison =

English poet and author (born 1950)

Blake Morrison FRSL
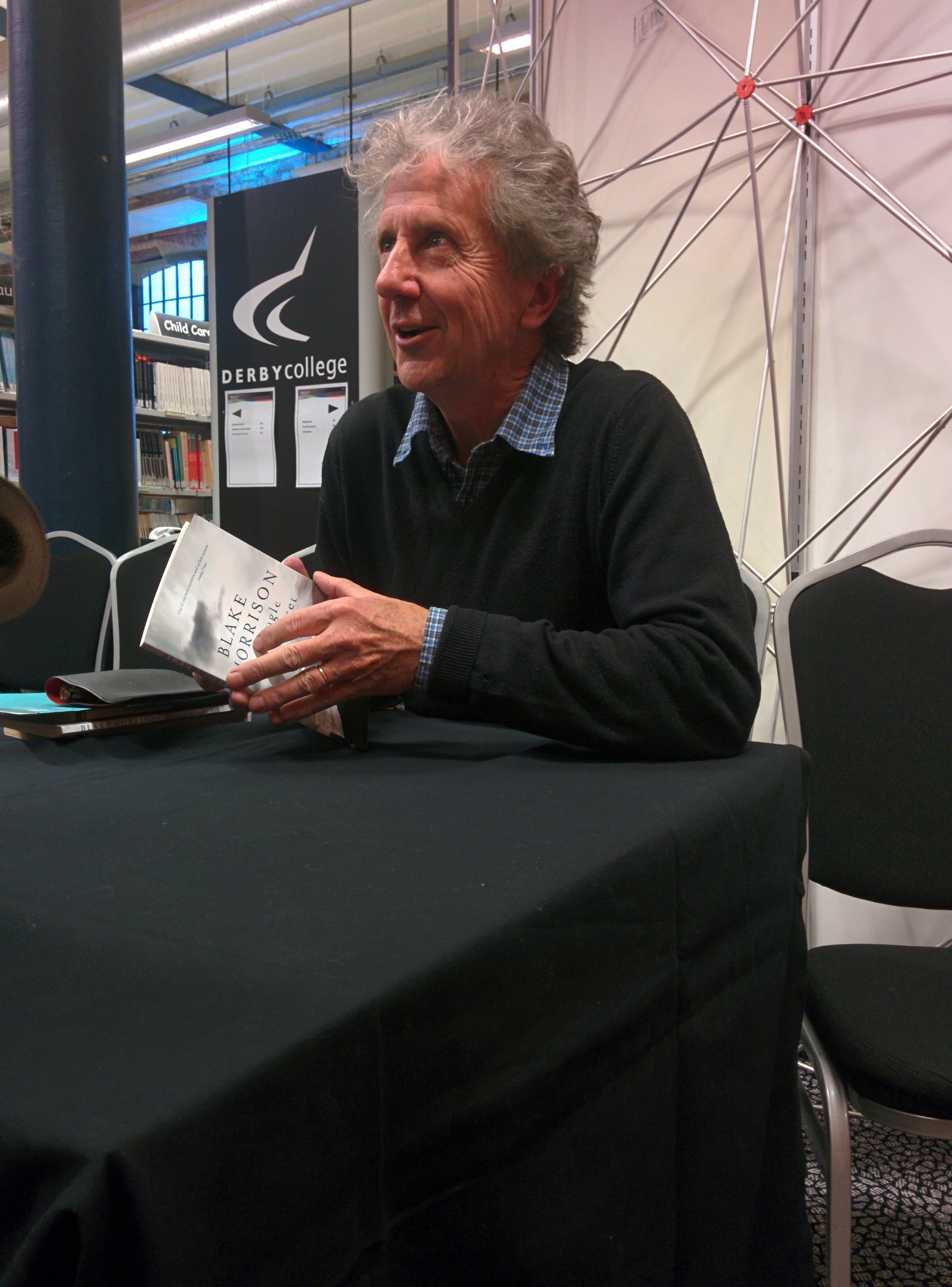
- Morrison at the Derby Book Festival in 2015
- Born: Philip Blake Morrison; 8 October 1950 (age 75); Skipton, West Riding of Yorkshire, England
- Education: Ermysted's Grammar School; University of Nottingham; University College London
- Occupations: Writer and academic
- Employer: Goldsmiths, University of London
- Notable work: And When Did You Last See Your Father? (1993)
- Awards: Eric Gregory Award; Dylan Thomas Award; Somerset Maugham Award; E. M. Forster Award; J. R. Ackerley Prize for Autobiography
- Website: blakemorrison.net

Philip Blake Morrison (born 8 October 1950) is an English poet and author who has published in a wide range of fiction and non-fiction genres. His greatest success came with the publication of his memoirs And When Did You Last See Your Father? (1993), which won the J. R. Ackerley Prize for Autobiography and was made into a drama film of the same title. He has also written a study of the murder of James Bulger, As If (1997).

Since 2003, Morrison has been Professor of Creative and Life Writing at Goldsmiths College, University of London. He is a Fellow of the Royal Society of Literature.

== Life and career ==
Morrison was born in Skipton, West Riding of Yorkshire, to an English father and an Irish mother. His parents were both physicians; his mother's maiden name was Agnes O'Shea, but her husband persuaded her to change "Agnes" to "Kim". The details of his mother's life in Ireland, to which Morrison had not been privy, formed the basis for his memoir, Things My Mother Never Told Me (2002).

Morrison grew up in Yorkshire, living in Thornton-in-Craven and attending Ermysted's Grammar School. He later studied English literature at the University of Nottingham and UCL. He worked for The Times Literary Supplement (1978–81) and was literary editor of both The Observer (1981–89) and the Independent on Sunday (1989–95). Morrison's early writing career outside of journalism was as a poet and poetry critic.

He became a full-time writer in 1995 and has since produced novels and volumes of autobiography as well as plays, libretti, and writing for television. Publications to which he has contributed articles include The New Yorker, the London Review of Books, the New Statesman, The New York Times, Poetry Review and Granta, and since 2001 he has written regularly for The Guardian.

In 2003, he became Professor of Creative and Life Writing at Goldsmiths College, London, and in 2008 he became chair of The Reader Organisation, the UK centre for research and promotion of reading as a therapeutic activity. In 2006, he was awarded an Honorary Doctorate of Arts by Plymouth University.

Morrison is a patron of Guildford-based educational, cultural and social community hub The Guildford Institute. He lives in Blackheath, south-east London.

== Published works ==
Morrison's first book was The Movement: English Poetry and Fiction of the 1950s (Oxford University Press, 1980). This was followed in 1982 by a critical guide to Seamus Heaney's poetry. Also in 1982, he co-edited The Penguin Book of Contemporary British Poetry with Andrew Motion. Morrison's first book of poetry, Dark Glasses, was published by Chatto and Windus in 1984. Other published works include Ballad of the Yorkshire Ripper (1986), written in Yorkshire dialect, and Pendle Witches (1996), illustrated with etchings by Paula Rego. Morrison's poems have also appeared in several anthologies, including Penguin Modern Poets 1 (1995).

His first novel was The Justification of Johann Gutenberg (Chatto & Windus, 2000), a fictionalized account of the life of Johannes Gutenberg. South of the River, described by The Observer as "a fat summer read of a novel, panoramic and commercial", was published in April 2007.

=== Memoirs ===
Morrison has been much acclaimed as a memoirist. His book And When Did You Last See Your Father? (1993) was hailed by Hugo Williams in The Spectator as "a classic of family literature", and praised by Roy Hattersley in The Guardian as "a near-masterpiece", while Nick Hornby called it a "painful, funny, frightening, moving, marvellous book". It became a bestseller, winning the Waterstone's/Volvo/Esquire Award for Non-Fiction and the J. R. Ackerley Prize for Autobiography. It is said to have "inspired a whole genre of literary confessional memoirs".

The companion volume, Things My Mother Never Told Me, published in 2002, was equally well received, including by Margaret Drabble, who wrote that Morrison "has succeeded in giving an enduring presence to his mother, that which she would never have claimed for herself. It is an honourable achievement", while the reviewer for The New York Times concluded: "I don't expect to read a more enthralling memoir all year. Or a finer book on love and love's impediments." Morrison's 2023 memoir, Two Sisters, was characterised by Rachel Cooke as "a wonderfully heartfelt and tender thing: delicate and unstinting and clear-eyed", while the review in The Times Literary Supplement concludes that the book "is true to a complex, many-layered grief."

Morrison has also written on memoir as a genre, and in 2026 he published a guide to life writing, On Memoir.

== Film, television and theatre adaptations ==
His 1993 memoir And When Did You Last See Your Father? was made into a film of the same name, released in 2007, starring Jim Broadbent as Morrison's father, Juliet Stevenson as his mother, Gina McKee as his wife, Sarah Lancashire as Aunty Beaty, and Colin Firth and Matthew Beard playing Blake Morrison himself as an adult and teenager, respectively. It was directed by Anand Tucker, produced by Elizabeth Karlsson, with a screenplay by David Nicholls. Filming took place in Cromford, Derbyshire, and the surrounding area. The film was released in 2007.

A three-part television adaptation of Morrison's 2010 novel The Last Weekend was shown on ITV1 in August–September 2012.

The TV series of Morrison's novel South of the River is being made by World Productions and adapted by screenwriter Danny Brocklehurst.

== Bibliography ==
- The Movement: English Poetry and Fiction of the 1950s (Oxford University Press, 1980)
- Seamus Heaney (Methuen, 1982)
- The Penguin Book of Contemporary British Poetry (co-editor with Andrew Motion) (Penguin, 1982)
- Dark Glasses (Chatto & Windus, 1984)
- The Ballad of the Yorkshire Ripper (and Other Poems) (Chatto & Windus, 1987)
- The Yellow House (illustrations by Helen Craig) (Walker Books, 1987)
- And When Did You Last See Your Father? (Granta, 1993)
- Penguin Modern Poets 1 (Morrison, James Fenton, Kit Wright) (Penguin, 1995)
- Mind Readings: Writers' Journeys Through Mental States (co-editor with Sara Dunn and Michèle Roberts) (Minerva, 1996)
- Pendle Witches (illustrations by Paula Rego) (Enitharmon Press, 1996)
- The Cracked Pot (Samuel French, 1996)
- As If (Granta, 1997)
- Too True (Granta, 1998)
- Selected Poems (Granta, 1999)
- The Justification of Johann Gutenberg (Chatto & Windus, 2000)
- Things My Mother Never Told Me (Chatto & Windus, 2002)
- Antigone and Oedipus (Northern Broadsides, 2003)
- South of the River (Chatto & Windus, 2007)
- The Last Weekend (Chatto & Windus, 2010)
- Shingle Street (Chatto & Windus, 2015)
- The Executor (Chatto & Windus, 2018)
- Two Sisters (Borough Press, 2023)
- Afterburn (Chatto & Windus, 2026)
- On Memoir (The Borough Press, 2026)

== Awards ==
- 1980: Eric Gregory Award
- 1985: Dylan Thomas Award
- 1985: Somerset Maugham Award for Dark Glasses
- 1988: E. M. Forster Award
- 1993: Esquire/Volvo/Waterstone's Non-Fiction Book Award for And When Did You Last See Your Father?
- 1994: J. R. Ackerley Prize for Autobiography for And When Did You Last See Your Father?
- 2006: Honorary Doctorate of Arts from Plymouth University
