= Nineteen Ways of Looking at Wang Wei =

1987 book by Eliot Weinberger

Nineteen Ways of Looking at Wang Wei: How a Chinese Poem Is Translated
- Author: Eliot Weinberger
- Language: English, Chinese, French, Spanish
- Subject: Translation studies
- Published: 1987
- Publisher: Moyer Bell
- Publication place: United States
- Pages: 53
- ISBN: 978-0-918825-14-8 (pbk.)
- Dewey Decimal: 895.113
- LC Class: PL2676.A683
- Website: https://www.ndbooks.com/book/nineteen-ways-of-looking-at-wang-wei

Nineteen Ways of Looking at Wang Wei: How a Chinese Poem Is Translated is a 1987 study by the American author Eliot Weinberger, with an addendum written by the Mexican poet Octavio Paz. The work analyzes 19 renditions of the Chinese-language nature poem "Deer Grove", which was originally written by the Tang-era poet Wang Wei (699–759). Weinberger compares translations of the poem into English, French, and Spanish, and analyzes the difficulties that are encountered when translating Chinese poetry. Since its publication, the book has been referred to as an essential work on the subject of translation. An updated edition including additional "ways" was published in 2016.

== Background ==
=== Chinese poetry and "Deer Grove" ===
When writing Chinese, each character is one syllable long, but corresponds to a unit of meaning called a morpheme, not just the syllable's pronunciation. Until the 20th century, almost all formal Chinese writing was in Literary Chinese, a prestige form that is particularly terse in character. Characters may have several related meanings and even function as different parts of speech; translation often involves deciding between plausible interpretations of a character in a given context. The prosody of Chinese poetry generally revolves around strict numbers of syllables and rhythms established by the tones of each syllable. According to Weinberger these qualities cannot be translated into Western languages, presenting a challenge for translators trying to write natural-sounding verse.

Wang Wei (699–759) is considered one of the most important Tang poets, representing what is considered a golden age for Chinese poetry. His poem "Deer Grove" (鹿柴; pinyin: Lù zhài) is part of the Wangchuan ji, a series of shanshui poems inspired by the natural beauty of locations around his estate on the Wang River (輞川; no relation) in Shaanxi. While the original manuscripts of the work have been lost, Wang was also a painter, and the stanzas in the Wangchuan ji likely accompanied paintings on long scrolls. The poem is a form of quatrain called a wujue, with each line being five characters long:

空山不見人，
但聞人語響；
返景入深林，
復照青苔上．

=== History of translation ===
In 1915, the American modernist poet Ezra Pound published Cathay, a collection of English translations of Chinese poems. Pound spoke no Chinese whatsoever, and made use of dictionaries and the ideographic meaning he perceived in characters to write his interpretations. As such, Cathay does not reflect a fluent speaker's understanding of the source poems. In his exposition, Weinberger considers the value of Pound's interpretations to be aesthetic instead of academic—adapting their presentation to English, rather than adhering to either English or Chinese conventions. He quotes T. S. Eliot's remark that Cathay represents "the invention of Chinese poetry in our time".

== Analysis ==
Weinberger begins the book by stating, "Poetry is that which is worth translating." He briefly lays out his view that poetry lives in a "constant state of transformation". For Weinberger this transformation takes place both in the experience of each reading, as well as in the concrete alterations made to a text over time—including that normally considered to be "translation". The first "way" is the received text of the original poem. As the earliest extant manuscript of "Deer Grove" dates to the 17th century, Weinberger characterizes it as "Wang's landscape after 900 years of transformation". He then provides a pinyin transliteration and a character-by-character gloss of the poem as "ways". The remaining 16 "ways" are translations of the poem into English, French, and Spanish, presented in the chronological order of their publication. Over time, translations rely less on traditional English-language form:

So lone seem the hills; there is no one in sight there,
But whence is the echo of voices I hear?
The rays of the sunset pierce slanting the forest,
And in their reflection green mosses appear.

Empty mountains:
no one to be seen.
Yet—hear—
human sounds and echoes.
Returning sunlight
enters the dark woods;
Again shining
on the green moss, above.

—W. J. B. Fletcher, "The Form of the Deer" (1919)
—Gary Snyder (1978)

Throughout, Weinberger points out recurring features that he feels poorly re-imagine Wang's poem. For example, several translations use personal pronouns such as I and we. These establish a discrete narrator, something which is not present in the source text. However, Weinberger rejects "accuracy" as an end in itself. He observes the different priorities expressed by translators who are primarily poets (such as Kenneth Rexroth) versus those who are primarily scholars (such as Burton Watson)—positively and negatively reviewing examples of both. Weinberger repeatedly criticizes what he sees as a need felt by some translators to "explain" and "make improvements" to the original, which he ascribes to an "unspoken contempt for the foreign poet". For example, regarding Chang Yin-nan and Lewis C. Walmsley's 1958 translation (No. 8) Weinberger remarks that, "It never occurs to Chang and Walmsley that Wang could have written the equivalent of casts motley patterns on the jade-green mosses had he wanted to. He didn't."

Renditions analyzed (1987)
No.	Date	Translator	Title	Language	Ref.
1	8th century	—	《鹿柴》	Chinese	(Note: Weinberger & Paz 1987, p. 3. The received text of the original poem.)
2	8th century	—	"Lù zhài"	Chinese	(Note: Weinberger & Paz 1987, p. 5. Pinyin transliteration.)
3	—	Eliot Weinberger	—	English	(Note: Weinberger & Paz 1987, p. 7. Character-by-character gloss.)
4	1919	W. J. B. Fletcher	"The Form of the Deer"	English	
5	1929	Witter Bynner; Kiang Kang-hu	"Deer-Park Hermitage"	English	
6	1944	Soame Jenyns	"The Deer Park"	English	
7	1948	G. Margouliès	« La Forêt »	French	
8	1958	Chang Yin-nan; Lewis C. Walmsley	"Deer Forest Hermitage"	English	
9	1960	C. J. Chen; Michael Bullock	"The Deer Enclosure"	English	
10	1962	James J. Y. Liu	—	English	
11	1970	Kenneth Rexroth	"Deep in the Mountain Wilderness"	English	
12	1971	Burton Watson	"Deer Fence"	English	
13	1972	Wai-lim Yip	"Deer Enclosure"	English	
14	1973	G. W. Robinson	"Deer Park"	English	
15	1974	Octavio Paz	«En la Ermita del Parque de los Venados»	Spanish	
16	1974	William McNaughton	"Li Ch'ai"	English	
17	1977	François Cheng	« Clos aux cerfs »	French	
18	1977	H. C. Chang	"The Deer Park"	English	
19	1978	Gary Snyder	—	English	(Note: Journal for the protection of all beings. San Francisco: City Lights. 4. Fall 1978. OCLC 58884200.)

== Publication history ==
An earlier version of Weinberger's survey was originally published in the 1979 anthology Zero: Contemporary Buddhist Thought. A Spanish translation was subsequently published in the Mexican magazine Vuelta, founded by Octavio Paz. Paz's own Spanish translation of "Deer Grove" was among those reviewed by Weinberger. The work was adapted into Nineteen Ways of Looking at Wang Wei by Moyer Bell, who published it as a paperback in 1987. The book also included an essay by Paz previously published in Vuelta.

An updated edition featuring 10 additional "ways", including translations into German, was published by New Directions in 2016:

Renditions analyzed (2016)
No.	Date	Translator	Title	Language	Ref.
20	1988	Günther Debon	»Im Hirschhagen«	German	
20	1991	Volker Klöpsch	»Hirschgehege«	German	
20	2009	Stephan Schuhmacher	»Am Wildgehege«	German	
21	1990	François Cheng	« Clos aux cerfs »	French	
21	1996	François Cheng	« Le Clos-aux-Cerfs »	French	
21	1989	Patrick Carré	« L'enclos du cerf »	French	
22	1991	Tony Barnstone; Willis Barnstone; Xu Haixin	"Deer Park"	English	
23	1991	Vikram Seth	"Deer Park"	English	
24	1994	Richard W. Bodman; Victor Mair	"Deer Enclosure"	English	
25	1996	Stephen Owen	"Deer Fence"	English	
26	2000	Sam Hamill	"Deer Park"	English	
27	2001	Arthur Sze	"Deer Park"	English	
28	2002	David Hinton	"Deer Park"	English	
28	2006	David Hinton	"Deer Park"	English	
29	2006	J. P. Seaton	"Deer Park"	English	

== Reception ==
Since its release, Nineteen Ways of Looking at Wang Wei has been held up both as a helpful primer for those investigating Tang poetry, as well as a classic work on the subject of translation. Weinberger's appraisals have been characterized as "celebrations" when positive, and as "withering" when negative. His approach has been credited for its balance of scholarship and intuition as pioneered by Pound.

In a postface to the book itself, Weinberger relates a personal anecdote about a "furious professor" who wrote to him following the essay's previous publication in Vuelta. In the letter, the professor accused Weinberger of "crimes against Chinese poetry", and referred him to a translation of "Deer Grove" from the 1950s by the sinologist Peter A. Boodberg that had been "curious[ly] neglected". Boodberg presented his translation as "a still inadequate, yet philologically correct, rendition of the stanza (with due attention to grapho-syntactic overtones and enjambment)". Weinberger himself characterizes it as "sound[ing] like Gerard Manley Hopkins on LSD" and "the strangest of all Weis", and thanks the professor for making him aware of it. Weinberger relates further interactions following the original book's publication in a second postface to the 2016 edition.

== See also ==
- Le Ton beau de Marot – book-length examination of a single translation of a minor French poem
- Translating Beowulf
  - "On Translating Beowulf" – essay by J. R. R. Tolkien
- "Thirteen Ways of Looking at a Blackbird" – 1917 poem by Wallace Stevens that inspired the title of Nineteen Ways of Looking at Wang Wei
