= Adel Khozam =

Emirati poet and columnist

Adel Khozam (Arabic: عادل خزام) is an Emirati poet and a weekly columnist in Al Ittihad Newspaper. He has worked in the UAE press since the 1980s.

Khozam has published around 14 Books in poetry collections and 2 novels, his poems have been translated into several languages. His last novel which was entitled, “Life through the Third Eye”, was translated into English.

Khozam composed several melodies and songs for theater and television in the UAE and won several times the best music award from Shariah Festival of Child Theater. He works in Dubai TV channels at Dubai Media Incorporated.

In August 2022, Adel Khozam was awarded the Best International Poet Award for compiling the anthology World Poetry Tree: An Anthology for Hope, Love and Peace, according to the results of voting by the Committee of the International Center for Translation and Poetry Research in China.

== Education ==
1986 he received a bachelor in business from the UAE University.

Khozam is a member of many media committees in the UAE, as he was a member of the jury of Dubai International Film Festival 2016, UAE Films Competition 2005, and was the editor-in-chief of the daily bulletin of Dubai International Film Festival 2007. His work has also been published in Banipal magazine.

== His writings ==
- “Taht Lesani” {Under my Tongue}, a collection of poems, the UAE, 1993
- "Al Wareeth” {The Heir}, a collection of poems, Beirut, 1997.
- “Fil Daw’a Wal Del Wa Bainahoma Al Haya” {In Light and Shadow and Life is Between Them}, studies on the development of visual arts in the UAE - Sharjah, 2000.
- “Al Setara Wal Akne’a’” {Curtain and Masks}, a survey on theater in the UAE - Sharjah, 2002.
- "Al Soa’al Allazi Yatba’a Al Dahek” {Cough that Follows Laughing}, a collection of poems, 2006.
- “Maskan Al Hakeem” {Dwelling of the Wise}, texts and reflections, 2010
- “Al Del Al Abyadh” {White Shadow}, novel, 2013.
- “Al Haya Beayn Thaletha” {Life in Third Eye}, 2014.
- “Rafeef Al Del” {Fremitus of Shadow}, a joint poetry book with two poets from Saudi Arabia and Bahrain, 2015.
- “Hassan Sherif”, a book on the artist Hassan Sherif, 2016.
- “Reesh Al Kalemat Al Mosafera” {Feathers of Traveling Words}, poetry 2017.
- (60 Resala Ela Shaer) “60 Letters to a Poet}, 2018
- {White Clouds OLD PATH} TRANSLATION - the biography and teachings of Buddha, 2019.
- (Al Rabei Al AAri) “The Naked Spring” a poetry collection 2019
