= Charles Lillard =

American poet (1944–1997)

Charles "Red" Lillard (February 26, 1944 – March 27, 1997) was an American-born poet and historian who spent much of his adult life in British Columbia and became a Canadian citizen in 1967. He wrote extensively about the history and culture of British Columbia, Southeast Alaska and the Pacific Northwest.

== Early life and education ==
Lillard was born in Long Beach, California and raised in Ketchikan, Alaska. His parents made a living from fishing. Lillard attended the University of British Columbia, earning a Bachelor of Arts and Master of Fine Arts.

== Career ==
Lillard published several books of poetry; his work was also included in literary publications and anthologies. His collection Shadow Weather was shortlisted for the Governor General's Award.

Lillard wrote extensively, and also collected and published stories, about the history of Canada's west coast. His book Seven Shillings a Year: the History of Vancouver Island won a BC Book Award in 1986. Lillart also wrote many stories of his travels and experiences in an informal style; he has been criticized for including names of people in his reminiscences without explaining who they were.

In 1978, 1979, and 1981 Lillard was co-editor (with Robin Skelton) of three themed issues, "The West Coast Renaissance" of the literary magazine The Malahat Review. In 2016 a foundation was set up in Lillard's name which presents an award each year to an author whose non-fiction work has appeared in The Malahat Review.

He died of cancer, at his home in Oak Bay, British Columbia in 1997. He left his wife, writer Rhonda Batchelor Lillard, and two children, Benjamin (b. 1984) and Joanna (b. 1986).

== Bibliography ==
=== Poetry ===
- Cultus Coulee - 1971
- Drunk on Wood - 1973
- Jabble - 1975
- Voice, My Shaman - 1976
- Poems - 1979 (with Doug Beardsley)
- Circling North - 1988
- Shadow Weather: Poems, Selected and New - 1996

=== Fiction ===
- A Coastal Range - 1984 (nominated for the Ethel Wilson Fiction Prize)

=== Non-fiction ===
- Seven Shillings a Year - 1986
- Fernwood Files - 1989 (with J. Ellis)
- The Brother, XII, B.C. Magus: A Quest for The Brother, XII - 1989 (with Ron MacIsaac and Don Clark)
- Land of Destiny - 1991 (with Michael Gregson)
- Just East of Sundown - 1995
- A Voice Great Within Us: The Story of Chinook - 1998 (with Terry Glavin)

=== Anthologies ===
- In the Wake of the War Canoe - 1981
- Dreams of Freedom: Bella Coola, Cape Scott, Sointula - 1982
- Warriors of the North Pacific: Missionary Accounts of the Northwest Coast, The Skeena and Stikine Rivers, and the Klondike, 1829-1900 - 1984
- Nootka - 1986
- The Ghostland People - 1989
- The Call of the Coast - 1992
