= Darshan Singh Awara =

Indian poet

Darshan Singh Awara (1906–1982) was an Indian poet, who wrote poetry under the impulse of the Indian Freedom Struggle in the early 1920s.

== Poetry ==
Awara’s poetry is noted for its expression of social protest and human struggle.The tone and diction of these poems were nationalist revolutionary and they were first published in a volume named Bijii di Tarak (The Lap of Lightning). It was confiscated by the British Government under the title Bhaghawat (Rebellion), followed in 1941 by Main Baghi Han (I am a Rebel). The rebellion at this state has gone from mere political defiance of the British rulers to the more fundamental spiritual rebellion against the belief in an all-pervading divinity and the principles and tactics of institutional religion. Awara saw the variety of religions in India as obstacles in the way not only of the National struggle for freedom but also of basic humanity. He died in 1982.
