= Colin McDougall =

Canadian author

Colin Malcolm McDougall DSO (1917–1984) was a Canadian author best known for his 1958 Governor General's Award-winning novel Execution.

== Biography ==
Born in Montreal, McDougall studied at McGill University before enlisting in Princess Patricia's Canadian Light Infantry during World War II. He was sent overseas, where he served as an officer during Canadian participation in the Italian campaign. He was awarded the Distinguished Service Order (DSO) and was Mentioned in Despatches. The recommendation for his DSO describes how he had fought in virtually every major engagement following the Allied invasion of Sicily, rising from a platoon commander, to regimental adjutant, then commanding the support company and finally, for the year before the recommendation was made, becoming commander of B company. It further describes three particular attacks led by him, including an action on 21 September 1944 when the company was ordered to improve the battalion's bridgehead over the river Marecchia where he frequently exposed himself to heavy enemy fire to direct Allied fire from tanks and mortars to ensure the success of his mission. Also slightly further north in Romana in December 1944 during the battle of the Naviglio Canal the company captured a self propelled gun, staff car and an intact bridge, thanks to a flanking movement he initiated when they were first faced with the gun. He had previously been recommended for decorations on two occasions, and is described as: "a real inspiration and example to his men, and largely responsible for the successes of his Company". The award of the DSO was gazetted on 23 June 1945.

After the war, McDougall returned to Montreal, where he became Registrar of McGill University, his place of employment for the rest of his life. He died in 1984.

== Literary career ==
In 1951, McDougall began writing short stories, three of which were published in the Canadian magazine Maclean's, with two more appearing in the American periodicals This Week and New Liberty. One of the Maclean's stories, "The Firing Squad", concerns a Canadian soldier who is sentenced to be executed for treason by his own army. The story won several awards, including First Prize in the Maclean's fiction contest, and became the basis for Execution.

McDougall wrote Execution between 1952 and 1957, keeping copious notes on its development that are now preserved in the McDougall Papers at the Rare Books and Special Collections Division, McGill University Libraries. Based loosely on McDougall's own experiences in Italy during the war, and on the real-life execution of Canadian Private Harold Pringle, the novel is both a harrowing depiction of men in combat and a philosophical meditation on the ethics of war. The novel was praised by such writers as Saul Bellow, Vera Brittain, and Hugh MacLennan, all of whom wrote to McDougall to express their admiration for his work (these letters are also in the McDougall Papers at McGill).

Despite plans to write a followup to Execution, McDougall never wrote another novel. In 2005, Execution was reissued in a paperback edition as part of the New Canadian Library series, published by McClelland and Stewart.

== See also ==
- Governor General's Award
- World War II
- Italian Campaign (World War II)
