= Eliot Weinberger =

American writer (born 1949)

- Born: February 6, 1949 (age 77) New York City, U.S.
- Occupation: Essayist, editor, translator
- Language: English
- Education: The Putney School; Yale University
- Notable works: Nineteen Ways of Looking at Wang Wei; Angels & Saints An Elemental Thing
- Notable awards: Jeanette Schocken / Bremerhaven Citizens' Prize for Literature; National Book Critics Circle Award

Eliot Weinberger (born February 6, 1949, in New York City) is an American writer, essayist, editor, and translator. He is primarily known for his essays and political articles, the former characterized by their wide-ranging subjects and experimental style, verging on a kind of documentary prose poetry, and the latter highly critical of American politics and foreign policy. His work regularly appears in translation and has been published in more than thirty languages.

== Life and work ==
He attended The Putney School, then Yale University, where he left without finishing his degree. Weinberger's books of literary writings include Works on Paper (1986), Outside Stories (1992), Written Reaction (1996), Karmic Traces (2000), The Stars (2005), Muhammad (2006), the "serial essay" An Elemental Thing (2007), which was selected by The Village Voice as one of the "20 Best Books of the Year", Oranges & Peanuts for Sale (2009), The Ghosts of Birds (2016), and Angels & Saints (2020), selected by The Times Literary Supplement (TLS) as "International Books of the Year."

His political articles are collected in 9/12 (2003), What I Heard About Iraq (2005), and What Happened Here: Bush Chronicles (2005), a finalist for the National Book Critics Circle award for criticism and also a TLS "International Books of the Year". The Guardian (UK) said of What I Heard About Iraq: "Every war has its classic antiwar book, and here is Iraq's." It has been adapted by others into a prize-winning theater piece, two cantatas, two prize-winning radio plays, a dance performance, and various art installations; it appeared on some tens of thousands of websites, and was read or performed in nearly one hundred events throughout the world on 20 March 2006, the anniversary of the invasion. When George W. Bush visited Angela Merkel's hometown of Stralsund, Germany, in July 2006, the local residents protested with a public reading of the text. In 2021, Weinberger was awarded the Jeanette Schocken / Bremerhaven Citizens' Prize for Literature, given biannually to a writer who "sets an example against injustice and violence, against hatred and intolerance." In their citation, the jurors wrote: “In the spirit of Enlightenment, Weinberger acts in these texts as an agent provocateur for a better world, as a great warner against the loss of freedom and human dignity."

Weinberger's long collaboration and friendship with the Nobel Prize–winning writer and poet Octavio Paz, which began when Weinberger was a teenager, led to many translations of Paz's work, including The Poems of Octavio Paz, In Light of India, and Sunstone. Among Weinberger's other translations of Latin American literature are Vicente Huidobro's Altazor, Xavier Villaurrutia's Nostalgia for Death, and Jorge Luis Borges' Seven Nights. His edition of Borges' Selected Non-Fictions received the National Book Critics Circle Award for criticism.

The author of a study of Chinese poetry translation, 19 Ways of Looking at Wang Wei, Weinberger is a translator of the poetry of the poet Bei Dao, and the editor of The New Directions Anthology of Classical Chinese Poetry, also a TLS "International Book of the Year." He is the series editor of Calligrams: Writings from and on China, jointly published by Chinese University of Hong Kong Press and New York Review Books. Among the other books he has edited are the anthologies American Poetry Since 1950: Innovators & Outsiders (1993) and World Beat: International Poetry Now from New Directions (2006).

He is a frequent contributor to the London Review of Books and occasional contributor to the New York Review of Books. From 2015 to 2017, he was the literary editor of the Murty Classical Library of India. He serves on the Advisory Boards of the Margellos World Republic of Letters (Yale University Press) and the Board of Directors of New Directions Publishing.

In 2000, Weinberger became the first U.S. literary writer to be awarded the Order of the Aztec Eagle by the government of Mexico. He was chosen by the German organization Dropping Knowledge as one of a hundred "world's most innovative thinkers." At the 2005 PEN World Voices Festival, he was presented as a "Post-National Writer". He was elected a Royal Society of Literature International Writer in 2025. He lives in New York City.

== Criticism ==
Weinberger's 2007 article "Mandaeans", published in Harper's Magazine, was sharply criticized by many Mandaeans, as the article described the Mandaeans' allegedly negative views of other religions and ethnic groups.

== Selected bibliography ==
=== As author ===
- Works on Paper, New Directions (New York, NY), 1986.
- Nineteen Ways of Looking at Wang Wei, Moyer-Bell (Wakefield, RI), 1987.
- Outside Stories, New Directions (New York, NY), 1992.
- Written Reaction: Poetics, Politics, Polemics, Marsilio Publishing, 1996.
- Karmic Traces, New Directions (New York, NY), 2000.
- 9/12, Prickly Paradigm Press (Chicago, IL), 2003.
- What I Heard About Iraq, Verso (London), 2005.
- The Stars (with Vija Celmins), Museum of Modern Art (New York, NY), 2005.
- What Happened Here: Bush Chronicles, New Directions (New York, NY), 2005; Verso (London), 2006.
- Muhammad, Verso (New York, London), 2006
- An Elemental Thing, New Directions (New York, NY), 2007.
- Oranges and Peanuts for Sale, New Directions (New York, NY), 2009.
- Wildlife, Giramondo (Sydney), 2012.
- Two American Scenes (with Lydia Davis), New Directions (New York, NY) 2013.
- The Wall, the City, and the World, Readux (Berlin), 2014.
- The Ghosts of Birds, New Directions (New York, NY), 2016.
- Nineteen Ways of Looking at Wang Wei (expanded edition), New Directions (New York, NY), 2016.
- Angels & Saints, New Directions (New York, NY), 2020.
- The Life of Tu Fu, New Directions (New York, NY), 2024.

=== As editor ===
- Montemora (literary magazine), 1975-1982.
- Una antologia de la poesia norteamericana desde 1950, Ediciones del Equilibrista (Mexico), 1992.
- American Poetry Since 1950: Innovators and Outsiders, Marsilio Publishing, 1993.
- Sulfur #33, (special issue: "Into the Past"), 1993.
- James Laughlin, Ensayos fortuitos, Ed. Vuelta (Mexico City), 1995.
- The New Directions Anthology of Classical Chinese Poetry, New Directions (New York, NY), 2003; Anvil (London), 2007.
- The Crafts of Mexico, edited by Margarita de Orellana, Alberto Ruy-Sánchez; guest editor, Eliot Weinberger. Smithsonian Books, (Washington), 2004.
- World Beat: International Poetry Now from New Directions, New Directions (New York, NY), 2006.
- Kenneth Rexroth, Songs of Love, Moon & Wind: Poems from the Chinese, New Directions (New York, NY), 2009.
- Kenneth Rexroth, Written on the Sky: Poems from the Japanese, New Directions (New York, NY), 2009.
- Elsewhere, Open Letter (Rochester, NY), 2014.

=== As editor and translator ===
- Octavio Paz, Eagle or Sun?, October House, 1970, revised edition, New Directions (New York, NY), 1976.
- Octavio Paz, A Draft of Shadows, New Directions (New York, NY), 1980.
- Homero Aridjis, Exaltation of Light, Boa Editions (Brockport, NY), 1981.
- Octavio Paz, Selected Poems, New Directions (New York, NY), 1984.
- Jorge Luis Borges, Seven Nights, New Directions (New York, NY), 1984.
- Octavio Paz, The Collected Poems 1957-1987, New Directions (New York, NY), 1987; Carcanet (Manchester, UK), 1988; revised New Directions edition, 1991.
- Vicente Huidobro, Altazor, Graywolf (Minneapolis, MN), 1988, revised edition, Wesleyan University Press (Middletown, CT), 2003.
- Octavio Paz, A Tree Within, New Directions (New York, NY), 1988.
- Octavio Paz, Sunstone, New Directions (New York, NY), 1991.
- Cecilia Vicuña, Unravelling Words and the Weaving of Water, with Suzanne Jill Levine, Graywolf (Port Townsend, WA), 1992.
- Xavier Villaurrutia, Nostalgia for Death, Copper Canyon Press (Port Townsend, WA), 1993.
- Octavio Paz, In Light of India, Harcourt Brace (New York, NY), 1997.
- Octavio Paz, A Tale of Two Gardens, New Directions (New York, NY), 1997.
- Octavio Paz, An Erotic Beyond: Sade, 1998.
- Jorge Luis Borges, Selected Non-Fictions, Viking (New York, NY), 1999. (individual selections translated by Esther Allen, Suzanne Jill Levine or Weinberger). U.K. edition: The Total Library, Penguin (London), 1999.
- Bei Dao, Unlock, New Directions (New York, NY), 2000; Anvil (London), 2006. (translations with Iona Man-Cheong)
- Octavio & Marie-Jose Paz, Figures & Figurations, New Directions (New York, NY), 2002.
- Bei Dao, The Rose of Time: New & Selected Poems, New Directions (New York, NY), 2010. (various translators)
- Octavio Paz, The Poems of Octavio Paz, New Directions (New York, NY), 2012.
