= Execution (novel) =

1958 novel by Colin McDougall

- Author: Colin McDougall
- Language: English
- Genre: War
- Set in: Italy
- Publisher: New Canadian Library
- Publication date: 1958
- Publication place: Canada
- Media type: Print (paperback)
- Pages: 312
- Awards: Governor General's Award for English-language fiction
- ISBN: 978-0771094392

Execution is a 1958 war novel by Canadian novelist and Second World War veteran Colin McDougall (1917–1984). Although it won McDougall the 1958 Governor General's Award for English-language fiction, it was his only novel, and after publishing it to wide acclaim he retreated into a quiet life as Registrar of McGill University in Montreal. Nevertheless, Execution stands with Timothy Findley's The Wars and Hugh MacLennan's Barometer Rising as one of the most widely read and studied Canadian war novels of the twentieth century.

== Plot summary ==
Based in part on McDougall's experience as an officer with Princess Patricia's Canadian Light Infantry, Execution follows the fictional Canadian 2nd Rifles Brigade during the Italian Campaign of 1943. Led by the flamboyant Brigadier Ian Kildare (a modern miles gloriosus, or braggart soldier), the Canadians invade Sicily where they meet with little resistance from the Italian Army, composed mostly of hapless conscripts who want no part in the war.

Despite Kildare's strict orders for his men to shoot Italian deserters on sight, the Canadians take kindly to a pair of buffoonish Italian deserters, more notable for their culinary skills than military prowess. Impetuously, Kildare orders the Canadians to execute the Italians. The Canadians are caught between the obligation to follow orders and the sense that executing the two Italians in cold blood is ethically unjustifiable—not to mention it being a violation of the Geneva Convention. The brutal execution of the two Italians forces the Canadians to confront the ethics of warfare, now that "the enemy" is no longer a distant and faceless target. Major Bunny Bazin, the most battle-hardened and philosophical of the Canadians, voices the novel's central theme when he states that "execution is... the ultimate degradation of man." Here the term "execution" works both literally (the killing of the Italians as a brutal act) and as a metaphor (war as a form of mass execution).

The novel's main protagonist, Lieutenant (later Major) John Adam (a semi-autobiographical foil for McDougall), is an efficient soldier and leader, who nevertheless finds "the vulture fear" inhabiting his soul after the execution of the Italians. Bound to protect and lead his men as they march through Italy, from Ortona to the Hitler Line near Monte Cassino, Adam finds himself struggling to maintain the composure fitting a commander, as an inner "horror" gnaws at his conscience (Adam's reflections occasionally resemble those of Marlow in Joseph Conrad's Heart of Darkness).

Eventually, Adam and his men stumble on a chance to redeem themselves when one of their own comrades, Rifleman Jones, a mildly retarded but efficient infantryman, is sentenced to be executed for treason by his own army, after he falls in with a ring of corrupt soldiers who murder an American. Although everyone, including a newly promoted General Kildare, knows that "Jonesy" is a scapegoat for the real murderers, the execution must go ahead out of political expediency. Led by Adam, the men wage a tenacious campaign to have Jonesy freed, but all efforts eventually fail. When Jonesy is led out to be executed, the officer in charge of the execution faints, and Adam is forced to command the firing squad himself.

Execution ends with Adam and the other men regaining a measure of their lost confidence, although Major Bazin dies on the battlefield.

== Themes and symbolism ==
The novel espouses McDougall's thesis that although the Canadians inhabit a brutal and unforgiving world, they are not intrinsically immoral. War makes men act brutally and inhumanely, but at their root is an essential goodness that even war cannot subsume completely. As Warren Cariou shows in his afterword to the New Canadian Library edition of Execution, the novel is not a realist novel, but an existential meditation on the ethics of war. Like Herman Wouk's The Caine Mutiny or Leo Tolstoy's War and Peace, both of which were key models for McDougall, Execution is a novel that combines visceral depictions of combat with philosophical questions about the blurred boundaries between good and evil. Jones is considered to be a scapegoat.

Other important themes include the abuse of military power, especially in one scene involving Allied generals planning an attack against the Germans that is bound to fail, and the isolation and alienation of front-line soldiers from mainstream society.

The second execution scene establishes Jonesy as a Christ-like figure, and his death is a symbolic atonement for the Canadians' "sin" of murdering the two Italians.

== Historical basis ==
Jonesy's execution is based in part on the real-life execution of Private Harold Pringle, a Canadian soldier executed by his own army in Italy and given a full historical treatment in Andrew Clark's book, A Keen Soldier (2002).

== TV versions ==
There have been at least two dramatic presentations of the novel on television.

=== Four Star Playhouse ===
Episode 87 of Four Star Playhouse featured a story called "The Firing Squad" and was televised originally on 6 October 1955 (Episode 1 of Season 4).

The play was directed by Robert Florey, and writing credits went to Frederick Brady (for adaptation) and Colin McDougall (for story).

=== Firing Squad ===
A made-for-television movie inspired by the novel titled Firing Squad aired in 1991. The film differed from the book significantly, taking place in France in the winter of 1944 (oddly enough, during the timeframe depicted, the Canadians in Northwest Europe were concentrated in the Nijmegen Salient). A fictional unit, the Alberta Fusiliers, is depicted, as part of a fictional formation - presumably a "Sixth Division" wearing black formation patches.

Like the book, the film seems inspired by the real-life story of Private Pringle, yet focuses not on the alleged criminal but on the other men of his unit. Unlike the book, there are no combat scenes, as the action takes place during the winter stalemate, and in fact given the French location, lack of front line positions, and other evidence given in dialogue, the soldiers in the film are located well behind the front line.

The main characters include a Provost Corps officer sent by higher headquarters to oversee the execution, the infantry officer who had lost his nerve in the fighting in Normandy and wanted to gain redemption by carrying out the execution, and the men of the firing squad including a stereotypical French-Canadian sergeant and an equally stereotyped halfwit with the comically unlikely name of "Smedley".

The movie was a typical low-budget Canadian affair, with a small dirt road in back-woods Ontario masquerading as Maple Leaf Route, and little sense of scale in terms of equipment, locations, or number of characters on screen.

== See also ==
- Battle of Ortona
- Battle of Monte Cassino
- Canadian Army
