= Doug Beardsley =

Canadian poet and educator (born 1941)

- Born: April 27, 1941 (age 85); Montreal, Quebec, Canada
- Education: University of Burgundy
- Occupations: Poet, educator, editor
- Writing career
- Language: English
- Genre: Poetry

Doug Beardsley (born April 27, 1941) is a Canadian poet and educator. He has collaborated with numerous other writers including Al Purdy, Theresa Kishkan and Charles Lillard.

He was born in Montreal, Quebec and studied at Sir George Williams University. There, Beardsley came under the poetic tutelage of Irving Layton, with whom he corresponded until Layton's death in 2006. Beardsley has lived in Victoria, British Columbia since 1974.

Beardsley earned a Bachelor's degree in Creative Writing from the University of Victoria and an M.A. in English from York University. He has lectured and taught at the University of Burgundy in Dijon, France; the University of Bordeaux; the Victoria Indian Cultural Centre, and the University of Victoria (where he taught from 1981 until retirement in 2006). He is the author of eleven volumes of poetry which been widely anthologized. In 1989, he was shortlisted for the Dorothy Livesay Poetry Prize, and trees were planted in Israel in 1996 in recognition of his services to Holocaust remembrance and education.

In 2005, Beardsley caught the media's attention when he began offering a second-year English course on "Hockey Literature and the Canadian Psyche," examining the place of hockey in the literature and culture of Canada.

== Bibliography ==
=== Non-fiction ===
- Country On Ice (Polestar Books, 1987)
- No One Else Is Lawrence! (Harbour, 1998), with Al Purdy

=== Anthologies edited ===
- The Rocket, The Flower, The Hammer, and Me (Polestar Books, 1988)
- Our Game: An All-Star Collection of Hockey Fiction (Polestar Books, 1997)
- The Man Who Outlived Himself: An Appreciation of John Donne (Harbour Publishing, 2000), with Al Purdy

=== Poetry ===
- Going Down Into History (Oolichan Books, 1976)
- The Only Country in the World Called Canada (Sesame Press, 1976)
- Six Saanich Poems (Victoria Indian Cultural Education Centre, 1977)
- Play on the Water: The Paul Klee Poems (Press Porcepic, 1978)
- Premonition & Gifts (Privately printed, 1979), with Theresa Kishkan
- Poems (Islomane Press, 1979), with Charles Lillard
- Pacific Sands (League of Canadian Poets, 1980) - pamphlet
- Kissing the Body of my Lord: The Marie Poems (Longspoon Press, 1982)
- A Dancing Star (Thisteldown, 1988)
- Free to Talk (Hawthorne Press, 1992)
- Inside Passage (Thistledown, 1993)
- Wrestling With Angels: New & Selected Poems, 1960-1995 (Signal Editions, 1996)
