= The New Poetry =

1962 poetry anthology edited by Al Alvarez

First edition

The New Poetry is a poetry anthology edited by Al Alvarez, published in 1962 and in a revised edition in 1966. It was greeted at the time as a significant review of the post-war scene in English poetry.

The introduction, written by Alvarez, is an essay called The New Poetry or Beyond the Gentility Principle. It originally appeared in a magazine called Commentary (not to be confused with the better-known New-York-based monthly of the same name) as a survey describing the state of modern poetry as Alvarez saw it. It made much play of contrasts between British/American poetry, old and then contemporary poetry, and for example British authors like Philip Larkin versus Ted Hughes.

The criteria for inclusion in The New Poetry were these: the poets had to be British (which excluded Sylvia Plath from the first edition); they needed to have been young enough to have made their reputations only after 1950 (this excluded the likes of W. H. Auden and Louis MacNeice); and they had to appeal to Alvarez himself. There were two exceptions to the first and second of these guidelines: Alvarez included long well-established Americans Robert Lowell and John Berryman at the start of the anthology. Alvarez concluded that Lowell and Berryman were the most influential figures on British poetry writing at that time, which justified their inclusion. Each poet was represented with a minimum of five poems. In the revised edition (1966) Alvarez relaxed these rules somewhat to allow Plath and yet another American poet, Anne Sexton, to be represented. In some senses the anthology can be seen as a reaction to Robert Conquest's New Lines anthology, which appeared a decade before.

The anthology included a very brief biographical note on each of the poets. The revised edition included three poems by Sylvia Plath that were previously unpublished.

== Poets in The New Poetry, 1966 edition ==
- Kingsley Amis
- John Berryman
- Arthur Boyars
- Iain Crichton Smith
- Donald Davie
- D. J. Enright
- John Fuller
- Thom Gunn
- Michael Hamburger
- Ian Hamilton
- Geoffrey Hill
- David Holbrook
- Ted Hughes
- Philip Larkin
- Robert Lowell
- George MacBeth
- Norman MacCaig
- Christopher Middleton
- Sylvia Plath
- Peter Porter
- Peter Redgrove
- Anne Sexton
- Jon Silkin
- R. S. Thomas
- Charles Tomlinson
- John Wain
- Ted Walker
- David Wevill

== See also ==
- 1962 in poetry
- 1962 in literature
- 1966 in poetry
- 1966 in literature
- 20th century in literature
- 20th century in poetry
- English literature
- List of poetry anthologies
