= World Poetry Tree: An Anthology for Hope, Love and Peace =

2022 global poetry anthology

World Poetry Tree: An Anthology for Hope, Love and Peace is a global poetry anthology published in 2022 edited by Arab poet Adel Khozam with the support of the UAE Ministry of Culture and Youth. According to Emirates News Agency, he book marks a historic literary initiative, being the first of its kind to compile works by literary luminaries from all continents into a single volume.

The 1,000-page anthology features contribution from 405 poets representing 106 countries.

In August 2022, Adel Khozam was awarded the Best International Poet Award for compiling the anthology, according to the results of voting by the Committee of the International Center for Translation and Poetry Research in China.
