= Poetry Speaks Expanded =

Poetry Speaks Expanded is a 2007 poetry anthology edited by Elise Paschen, Rebekah Presson Mosby and Series Editor Dominique Raccah.

It is a fusion of the poets' words with the poets' voices, including text and audio CD recordings of nearly fifty of the greatest poets who ever lived. Published by Sourcebooks, Inc., it joined two other collections of poetry: Poetry Speaks (2001; edited by Elise Paschen, Rebekah Presson Mosby, and Series Editor Dominique Raccah) and Poetry Speaks to Children (2005; edited by Elise Paschen and Series Editor Dominique Raccah).

== Poets included in Poetry Speaks Expanded ==
Robert Graves -- E. E. Cummings -- Walt Whitman -- Ezra Pound -- William Butler Yeats -- Gertrude Stein -- Carl Sandburg -- James Joyce -- William Carlos Williams -- Ted Hughes -- Robinson Jeffers -- Philip Larkin -- Wallace Stevens -- Louise Bogan -- Melvin B. Tolson -- Laura (Riding) Jackson -- Ogden Nash -- W. H. Auden -- Louis MacNeice -- Allen Ginsberg -- Theodore Roethke -- Elizabeth Bishop --Robert Hayden -- Robert Frost -- Muriel Rukeyser -- Gwendolyn Brooks -- Randall Jarrell -- Jack Kerouac -- John Berryman -- Dylan Thomas --Robert Lowell -- Robert Browning -- Robert Duncan -- May Swenson -- John Crowe Ransom

== Recorded Poetry ==
- James Joyce reads "Anna Livia Plurabelle" from Finnegans Wake, which is the first time this has ever been released.
- T.S. Eliot reads "The Love Song of J. Alfred Prufrock"
- Sylvia Plath reads "Daddy" and "Lady Lazarus"
- Jack Kerouac reads from "MacDougal Street Blues"
- May Swenson rehearses "The Watch" prior to a formal reading
- Ted Hughes reading "February 17" during a BBC interview
- A never-before-published recording of Alfred, Lord Tennyson reading "The Charge of the Light Brigade"
- Robert Frost reading "The Road Not Taken" and "Stopping by Woods on a Snowy Evening"
