= Jay Macpherson =

Canadian poet (1931–2012)

- Born: Jean Jay Macpherson; June 13, 1931; London, England, UK
- Died: March 21, 2012 (aged 80); Toronto, Ontario, Canada
- Education: Carleton University; University College London; Victoria University, Toronto
- Occupations: Poet, Academic
- Writing career
- Language: English
- Genre: poetry
- Notable works: The Boatman, Welcoming Disaster
- Notable awards: Governor General's Award, Levinson Prize

Jean Jay Macpherson (June 13, 1931 – March 21, 2012) was a Canadian lyric poet and scholar. The Encyclopædia Britannica calls her "a member of 'the mythopoeic school of poetry,' who expressed serious religious and philosophical themes in symbolic verse that was often lyrical or comic."

== Life ==
Jay Macpherson was born in London, England, in 1931. She was brought to Newfoundland in 1940 as a 'war guest'. She took high school at Bishop Spencer College, St. John's, and Glebe Collegiate, Ottawa.

In 1951 Macpherson received a BA from Carleton College (now Carleton University) in 1951, followed by a year at University College in London. She received a BLS from McGill University, and then completed her MA and PhD at Victoria University in the University of Toronto, both supervised by professor and critic Northrop Frye.

Macpherson published poetry in Contemporary Verse in 1949. Her first book was published in 1952.

In 1954 Macpherson began her own small press, Emblem Books, which published her second volume, O Earth Return. Between 1954 and 1963, Emblem Books published eight chapbooks featuring the work of Canadian poets, including Dorothy Livesay, Alden Nowlan, and Al Purdy.

Macpherson's two earlier volumes were incorporated into The Boatman (1957), a book which "gained her a considerable reputation. Dedicated to Northrop Frye and his wife, the collection reflects Frye's emphasis on the mythic and archetypal properties of poetry." The Boatman won the Governor General's Award in 1958.

Macpherson taught English at Victoria College from 1957 until 1996. She became a Professor of English in 1974.

Her 1982 book The Spirit of Solitude is "a highly regarded study of the elegiac and pastoral traditions from the 17th century onward."

Jay Macpherson died on Mar 21, 2012.

== Writing ==
Macpherson has been described "as a 'mythopoeic' poet – rooted in the teachings of Frye, the archetypes of Carl Jung, and the intensely conservative social vision of T.S. Eliot." Within her work, "recurring themes involve the creation, fall, flood, redemption and the apocalypse." Her interest is in "authentic myth", "the ones that have some imaginative force behind them."

In technique, Macpherson has been placed "beside Margaret Avison, P. K. Page, Phyllis Webb, but especially Anne Hébert – particularly in the use of the Gothic and macabre themes and devices."

=== The Boatman ===
Macpherson's first major work, The Boatman (1957), "describes a world where redemption is still possible." Northrop Frye (to whom The Boatman was dedicated) called it the "one good book" of Canadian poetry for that year. He added: "There is little use looking for bad lines or lapses in taste: The Boatman is completely successful within the conventions it adopts, and anyone dissatisfied with the book must quarrel with the conventions. Among these are the use of a great variety of echoes, some of them direct quotations from other poems, and an interest in myth, both Biblical and Classical."

The Boatman of the title "is Noah, but both Noah and the ark itself form an allegory for the artist and the artistic experience, the ark representing Jung's collective unconscious." "The creation is inside its creator, and the ark similarly attempts to explain to Noah ... that it is really inside him, as Eve was once inside Adam:

When the four quarters shall
Turn in and make one whole,
Then I who wall your body,
Which is to me a soul,

Shall swim circled by you
And cradled on your tide,
Who was not even, not ever,
Taken from your side.

"As the ark expands into the flooded world, the body of the Biblical leviathan, and the order of nature, the design of the whole book begins to take shape. The Boatman begins with a poem called 'Ordinary People in the Last Days,' a wistful poem about an apocalypse that happens to everyone except the poet, and ends with a vision of a 'Fisherman' who ... catches 'myriad forms,' eats them, drinks the lake they are in, and is caught in his turn by God."

=== Welcoming Disaster ===
Macpherson's next major work, Welcoming Disaster (1974), "employs more complex forms to pursue its quest for meaning; the poems frequently succeed in maintaining imaginative contact with social reality while extending Macpherson's essential concern with psychological and metaphysical conditions."

George Woodcock saw Welcoming Disaster and The Boatman as similar, even complementary: "They are narratives of journeys into spiritual day and night, disguised, no doubt, by all the devices of privacy, but nonetheless derived from true inner experiences." Margaret Atwood emphasized their differences: "If The Boatman is 'classical,' . . . then Welcoming Disaster is, by the same lights, 'romantic': more personal, more convoluted, darker and more grotesque, its rhythms more complex"

"Welcoming Disaster, has the critics baffled. They cannot agree on its proper interpretation - is it a darker, more tragic vision or is the possibility of redemption there?" Suniti Namjoshi saw it as a book about redemption: about the necessity "to hit bottom and then to make the journey up"; "after a descent into the underworld ... it is possible to return to the ordinary world of everyday life". David Bromwich, reviewing the book in Poetry, saw it as even more positive: for him, it "moves from consolation to guilt to terror and finally to a deepened consolation." On the other hand, Lorraine Weir interpreted the book to be saying that the "underworld journey of redemption ... fails". "Fertility is not restored, the underworld is not left behind." Weir calls Macpherson's vision "inescapably a tragic one."

== Recognition ==
Macpherson won Poetry magazine's Levinson Prize, and the University of Western Ontario President's Medal, in 1957.

She won the Governor General's Award for The Boatman in 1958.

A small park in her former Toronto neighbourhood, Jay Macpherson Green, is named for her near Avenue Road and Dupont Street.

== Publications ==
=== Poetry ===
- A Country Without a Mythology. n.p.: 195?.
- 1952:Nineteen Poems. Mallorca, Spain: Seizin Press
- 1954:O Earth Return. Toronto: Emblem Books
- 1957:The Fisherman: A Book of Riddles
- 1957:The Boatman. Toronto: Oxford University Press
- 1959:A Dry Light & The Dark Air. Toronto: Hawkshead Press
- 1968:The Boatman and Other Poems. Toronto: Oxford UP
- 1974:Welcoming Disaster: Poems, 1970-74. Toronto: Saannes Publications
- 1981:Poems Twice Told: The Boatman & Welcoming Disaster. Toronto: Oxford University Press

=== Fiction ===
- 1962:The Four Ages of Man: The Classical Myths. Toronto: Macmillan

=== Non-fiction ===
- 1972:Pratt’s Romantic Mythology: The Witches’ Brew. St. John's Nfld.: Memorial University
- 1974:"Beauty and the Beast" and Some Relatives. Toronto: Toronto Public Library
- 1982:The Spirit of Solitude: Conventions and Continuities in Late Romance. New Haven: Yale University Press

Except where otherwise noted, bibliographic information courtesy Brock University.
