= Bertram Warr =

Canadian poet

Bertram Warr (December 7, 1917 – April 3, 1943) was a Canadian poet and a sergeant in the RAFVR, who was lost in action during World War II over Essen, Germany in April 1943.

== Biography ==
Born in Toronto, after Warr graduated from high school, he worked as an office clerk and hotel porter. In 1938, he hitchhiked to Halifax, Nova Scotia and eventually stowed away on a passenger ship to England in the pursuit of a career in literature. In London, he worked as a clerk for an oyster company. This supported him as he studied at the University of London, where he became a socialist. When World War II began, he joined the Fire Service. In 1941, Warr was about to be conscripted into the Royal Air Force so he volunteered to serve in the RAF Volunteer Reserve. Warr served with 158 Squadron RAF flying in Halifax bombers as a Bomb Aimer. On April 3, 1943, he was lost in action when his Halifax was shot down with the loss of all crew.

== Reputation ==
Warr gained a slight reputation after having various poems published with different British literary magazines and anthologies. In 1941, he had 'Yet a Little Onwards', a collection of fourteen poems, published by Favil Press' 'Resurgam Younger Poets' series with. Robert Graves and G.S. Fraser gave the work favourable reviews. Some of these poems would be anthologized into 'Poems of this War'.

His poems, like his British contemplates, blended both politics and realism in a controlled free-verse style.

A tribute issue of Contemporary Verse in October 1945 printed several of his poems alongside an article by Alan Crawley.

Warr's work was revived in 1970 by Len Gasparini and Warr's sister Mary Connelly in a small volume titled 'Acknowledgement to Life'. The book featured a preface by Earle Birney, Birney stating 'that had Warr survived the hostilities, he would likely have become an important voice in Canadian poetry.'.

In 2010, three of his poems ('Working Class'; 'The Deviator'; and 'The Heart to Carry On') were anthologized in Brian Trehearne's 'Canadian Poetry: 1920–1960'.

== Publications ==
- Yet a Little Onwards. London: Favil Press, 1941.
- Acknowledgement to Life: The collected poems of Bertram Warr: Acknowledgment to Life. Toronto: Ryerson Press, 1970.
