= Al Purdy =

Canadian free verse poet (1918–2000)

Al Purdy OC OOnt
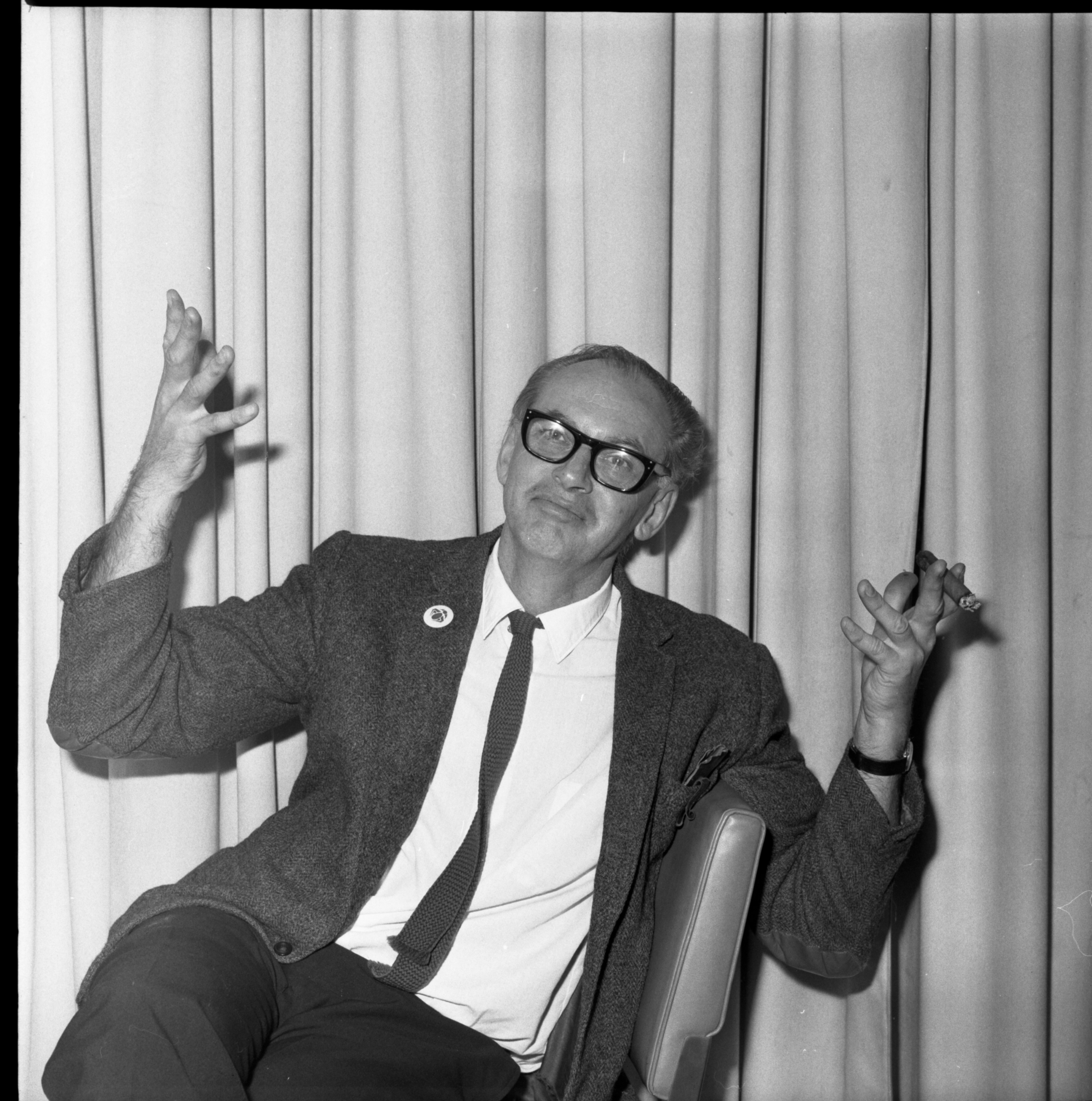
- Born: Alfred Wellington Purdy; December 30, 1918; Wooler, Ontario, Canada
- Died: April 21, 2000 (aged 81); North Saanich, British Columbia, Canada
- Known for: Writer, editor and poet
- Spouse: Eurithe

Alfred Wellington Purdy OC OOnt (December 30, 1918 – April 21, 2000) was a 20th-century Canadian free verse poet. Purdy's writing career spanned fifty-six years. His works include thirty-nine books of poetry; a novel; two volumes of memoirs and four books of correspondence, in addition to his posthumous works. He has been called English Canada's "unofficial poet laureate" and "a national poet in a way that you only find occasionally in the life of a culture."

== Biography ==
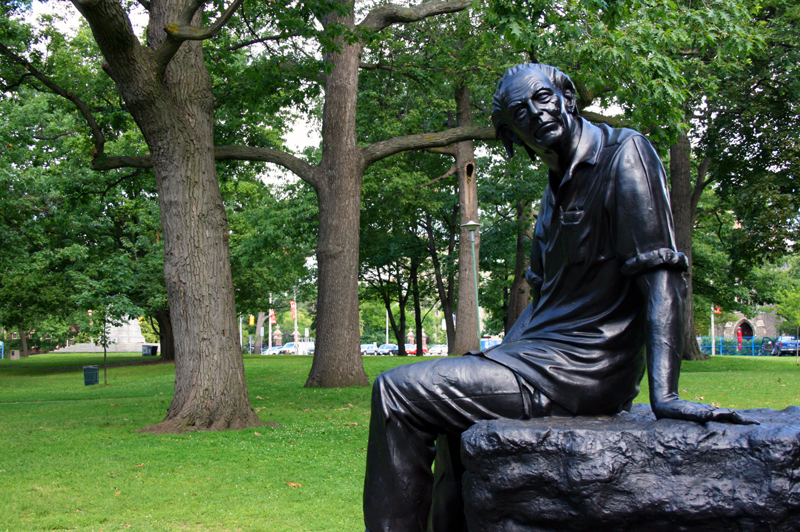
Al Purdy Memorial "Voice of the Land" by Sculptors Veronica and Edwin Dam de Nogales

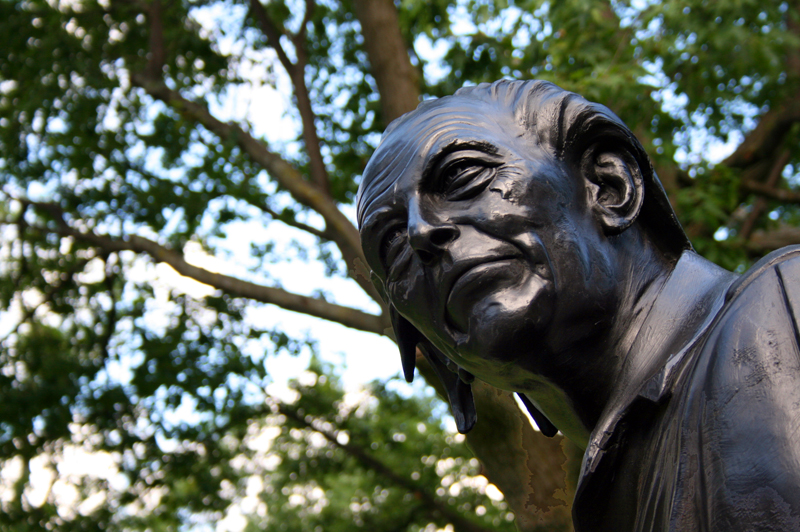
Alfred Purdy Memorial "Voice of the Land" by Veronica and Edwin Dam de Nogales, detail

Born in Wooler, Ontario, Purdy went to Albert College in Belleville, Ontario, and Trenton Collegiate Institute in Trenton, Ontario. He dropped out of school at 17 and rode the rails west to Vancouver. He served in the Royal Canadian Air Force during World War II. Following the war, he worked in various jobs until the 1960s, when he was finally able to support himself as a writer, editor and poet.

In 1957, Purdy and his wife Eurithe moved to Roblin Lake in Ameliasburgh, Ontario (southeast of Trenton, in Prince Edward County), where they built an A-frame cottage, and this became his preferred location for writing. In his later years, he divided his time between North Saanich, British Columbia, and his cottage at Roblin Lake.

In addition to his poems and novel, Purdy's work includes two volumes of memoirs, the most recent of which was Reaching for the Beaufort Sea. He also wrote four books of correspondence, including Margaret Laurence - Al Purdy: A Friendship in Letters and radio and television plays for the CBC. He was writer-in-residence at several Canadian universities; contributed to Acta Victoriana, literary journal of Victoria College; and edited a number of anthologies of poetry.

He wrote the introduction to the last book of poetry by his friend Milton Acorn, The Whiskey Jack. Purdy was also a long-time friend of American author Charles Bukowski. Bukowski once said: "I don't know of any good living poets. But there's this tough son of a bitch up in Canada that walks the line."

However, acclaim is not universal. Noted Canadian formalist poet James Pollock, when asked to "Name one poet, living or dead, it seems everyone loves but you," answered: "In Canada, Al Purdy. The emperor has no clothes."

Al Purdy died in North Saanich. His final collection of poetry, Beyond Remembering: The Collected Poems of Al Purdy, was released posthumously in the fall of 2000.

== Memorial ==
A grass-roots movement to preserve Purdy's A-frame cottage in Ameliasburgh has been organized by Jean Baird (wife of poet George Bowering) and Purdy's publisher Howard White of Harbour Publishing, who together founded the A-Frame Trust with the intent of raising $1 million to preserve the house as a memorial to Purdy and a writing retreat for other writers. The campaign is profiled in Brian D. Johnson's 2015 documentary film Al Purdy Was Here.

In 2016, it was revealed in Toronto Life that John Hofsess contributed to the assisted suicide of Purdy when the poet was dying of cancer.

In 2024, his widow Eurithe launched the Purdy Poetry Prize to honour new works of poetry published by Canadian writers.

== Awards and recognition ==
Honours and awards Purdy received include the Order of Canada (O.C.) in 1982, the Order of Ontario in 1987, and the Governor General's Award, in 1965 for his collection The Cariboo Horses, and again in 1986 for The Collected Poems of Al Purdy. The League of Canadian Poets gave Purdy the Voice of the Land Award, a special award created by the League to honour his unique contribution to Canada.

Purdy's collection of poems, Rooms for Rent in the Outer Planets: Selected Poems, 1962–1996, was chosen for inclusion in Canada Reads 2006, where it was championed by poet Susan Musgrave. On May 20, 2008, a large bronze statue of Purdy was unveiled in Queen's Park in downtown Toronto.

== Publications ==
=== Lifetime ===
==== Poetry ====
- The Enchanted Echo. Vancouver: Clarke & Stuart, 1944.
- Pressed on Sand. Toronto: Ryerson, 1955.
- Emu, Remember!. Fredericton, NB: U of New Brunswick P, 1956.
- The Crafte So Longe to Lerne. Toronto: Ryerson, 1959.
- The Blur in Between: Poems 1960-61. Toronto: Emblem, 1962.
- Poems for All the Annettes. Toronto: Contact P, 1962.
- The Cariboo Horses. Toronto: McClelland & Stewart, 1965.
- North of Summer: Poems from Baffin Island. Toronto: McClelland & Stewart, 1967.
- About Being a Member of Our Armed Forces — 1967
- Wild Grape Wine. Toronto: McClelland & Stewart, 1968.
- Love in a Burning Building. Toronto: McClelland & Stewart, 1970.
- The Quest for Ouzo. Trenton, ON: M. Kerrigan Almey, 1969.
- Hiroshima Poems. Trumansburg, NY: Crossing P, 1972.
- Selected Poems. Toronto: McClelland & Stewart, 1972. ISBN 0-7710-7198-1
- On the Bearpaw Sea. Jean Wong illus. Burnaby, BC: Blackfish Press, 1973. Toronto: Red Maple Foundation, 1974. ISBN 0-9698687-0-7
- Sex & Death. McLelland & Stewart. ISBN 0-7710-7200-7, ISBN 0-7710-7201-5
- In Search of Owen Roblin. Toronto: McClelland & Stewart, 1974. ISBN 0-7710-7202-3
- The Poems of Al Purdy. Toronto: McClelland & Stewart, 1976. ISBN 0-7710-9510-4
- Sundance at Dusk. Toronto: McClelland & Stewart, 1976.
- A Handful of Earth. Coatsworth, ON: Black Moss P, 1977. ISBN 0-88753-022-2 ISBN 0887530230 ISBN 0-88753-024-9
- At Marsport Drugstore. Sutton West, ON: Paget P, 1977. ISBN 0-920348-02-5
- No Other Country. Toronto: McClelland & Stewart, 1977. ISBN 0-7710-7208-2
- Moths in the Iron Curtain. Abridged edition. Cleveland, OH: Black Rabbit Press, 1977.
- No Second Spring. Coatsworth, ON: Black Moss P, 1978. ISBN 0-88753-038-9
- Being Alive: Poems 1958–78. Toronto: McClelland & Steward, 1978. ISBN 0-7710-7207-4
- Moths in the Iron Curtain. Illustrated by Eurithe Purdy. Sutton West, ON: Paget P, 1979.ISBN 0920348084 ISBN 9780920348086 ISBN 0920348106 ISBN 9780920348109
- The Stone Bird. Toronto: McClelland & Stewart, 1981.
- Bursting Into Song: An Al Purdy Omnibus. Windsor, ON: Black Moss, 1982. ISBN 0-88753-085-0
- Birdwatching at the Equator: The Galapagos Island Poems. Sutton West, ON: Paget P, 1982. ISBN 0-920348-27-0
- Morning and It's Summer. Quadrant Editions, 1983. ISBN 0-86495-032-2 ISBN 0864950225
- Piling Blood. Toronto: McClelland & Stewart, 1984. ISBN 0-7710-7213-9
- The Collected Poems of Al Purdy. Toronto: McClelland & Stewart, 1986. ISBN 0-7710-7215-5
- The Woman on the Shore. Toronto: McClelland & Stewart, 1990. ISBN 0-7710-7217-1
- Two Poems - Broadside - Pie Tree Press 1990 - Limited to 100 copies & 26 lettered copies
- Collected Poems. [Audio cassette.] Toronto: McClelland & Stewart, 1990. ISBN 978-0-7710-7031-0
- Naked with Summer in Your Mouth. Toronto: McClelland & Stewart, 1994. ISBN 0-7710-7221-X
- Rooms for Rent in the Outer Planets: Selected Poems 1962-1996. Madeira Park, BC: Harbour Publishing, 1996. ISBN 1-55017-148-8
- To Paris Never Again. Madeira Park, BC: Harbour Publishing, 1997. ISBN 1-55017-173-9
- The Man Who Outlived Himself — 1999 (with Doug Beardsley)
- Beyond Remembering: The Collected Poems of Al Purdy. Madeira Park, BC: Harbour Publishing, 2000. ISBN 1-55017-225-5
- Home Country: Selected Poems. Parry Sound, ON: Church Street P, 2000.

==== Prose ====
- The Bukowski/Purdy Letters 1964–1974. Seamus Cooney ed. Sutton West, ON: Paget Press, 1984. ISBN 0-920348-26-2 ISBN 0920348254 ISBN 0-920348-28-9
- The Woodcock/Purdy Letters 1964–1974. George Galt ed. Toronto: ECW, 1988. ISBN 978-1-55022-006-3
- A Splinter in the Heart. a novel. Toronto: McClelland & Stewart, 1990. ISBN 0-7710-7218-X
- Reaching for the Beaufort Sea: An Autobiography. Madeira Park, BC: Harbour Publishing, 1993. ISBN 1-55017-088-0
- Margaret Laurence — Al Purdy: A Friendship in Letters. John Lennox ed. Toronto: McClelland & Stewart, 1994. ISBN 978-0-7710-5256-9
- Starting from Ameliasburgh: The Collected Prose of Al Purdy. Sam Solecki ed. Madeira Park: Harbour Publishing, 1995. ISBN 1-55017-127-5
- No One Else is Lawrence! (with Doug Beardsley). Madeira Park, BC: Harbour Publishing, 1998. ISBN 1-55017-194-1
- Yours, Al: The Collected Letters of Al Purdy. Sam Solecki ed. Madeira Park, BC: Harbour, 2004. ISBN 1-55017-332-4
- We Go Far Back in Time: The Letters of Earle Birney and Al Purdy, 1947-1987. Nicholas Bradley ed. Madeira Park, BC: Harbour, 2014. ISBN 978-1-55017-610-0

==== Edited ====
- The New Romans: Candid Canadian Opinions of the U.S.. New York, Edmonton: St. Martin's P, Hurtig, 1968.
- Fifteen Winds: A Selection of Modern Canadian Poems. Toronto: Ryerson, 1969.
- Storm Warning: The New Canadian Poets. Toronto: McClelland & Stewart, 1971. ISBN 0-7710-7191-4
- Storm Warning 2: The New Canadian Poets. Toronto: McClelland & Stewart, 1976. ISBN 0-7710-7204-X

=== Posthumous ===
- More Easily Kept Illusions. Waterloo: Wilfrid Laurier P, 2006. ISBN 978-0-88920-490-4
- The Al Purdy A-Frame Anthology - 2009
- Unexplored Country - 2009, Alden Press, Clinton, B.C. 3 Broadside poems. Limited to 60 copies.

== In media ==
A CBC Radio recording of a 1968 reading by Purdy of his poem Quinte Hotel at a gathering conference of Canadian poets in Toronto was adapted as an animated short film At the Quinte Hotel, which received the Canadian Film Institute Award for best Canadian animation at the Ottawa International Animation Festival.

== See also ==
- Canadian literature
- Canadian poetry
- List of Canadian poets
