= Statue of John A. Macdonald (Toronto) =

Sculpture in Toronto, Ontario, Canada

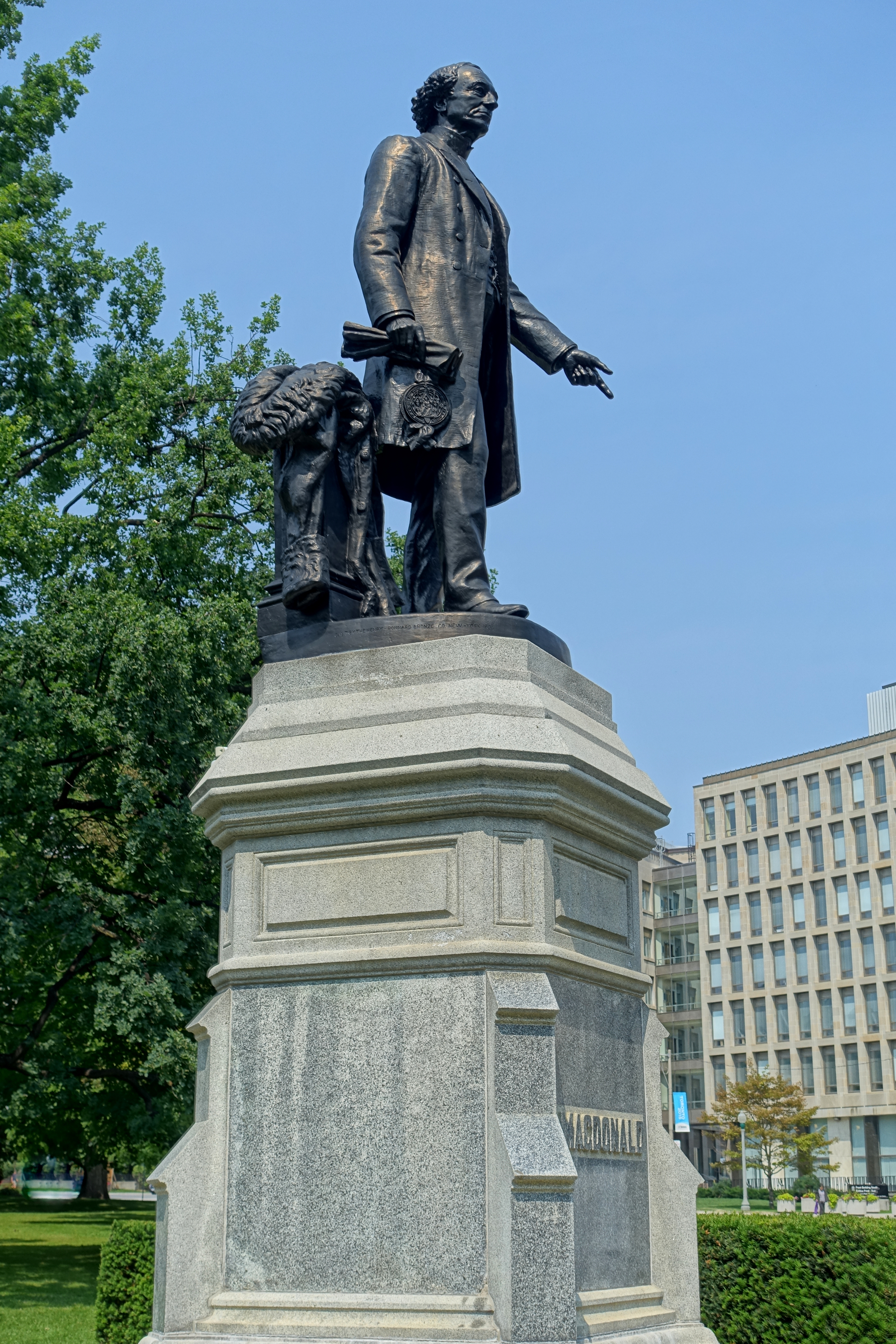
- The statue in 2015
- Subject: John A. Macdonald
- Condition: removed from display
- Location: Toronto, Ontario, Canada; 43°39′38.6″N 79°23′27.2″W
- Owner: Ontario Legislature

A statue of Canadian Prime Minister John A. Macdonald by Hamilton MacCarthy is part of the collection of statues installed in Toronto's Queen's Park, in Ontario, Canada. The sculpture was unveiled in 1894. When on display, the statue overlooked University Avenue in front of the Ontario Legislature.

The statue was surrounded by wooden boarding from 2020 to 2025, after demonstrators protesting against the legacy of the Canadian Indigenous Residential School System threw pink paint on the statue. After the discovery of possible unmarked graves on the grounds of the former residential schools, children's shoes were placed at the base of the wooden boarding. In June 2025, the wooden boarding was removed, making the statue visible to the public for the first time in five years.

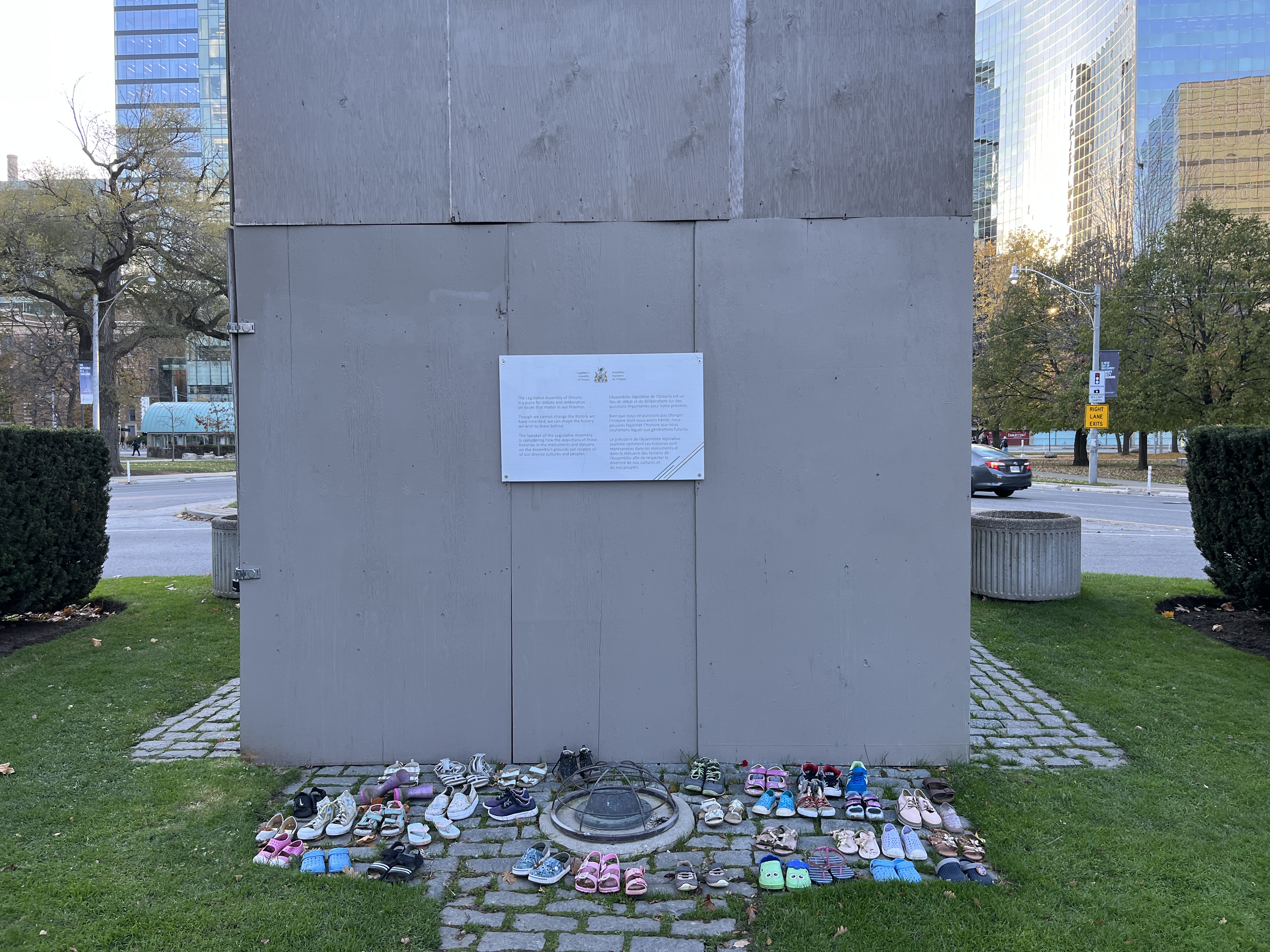
Statue in box
