= William Lyon Mackenzie Monument =

Monument in Toronto, Ontario, Canada

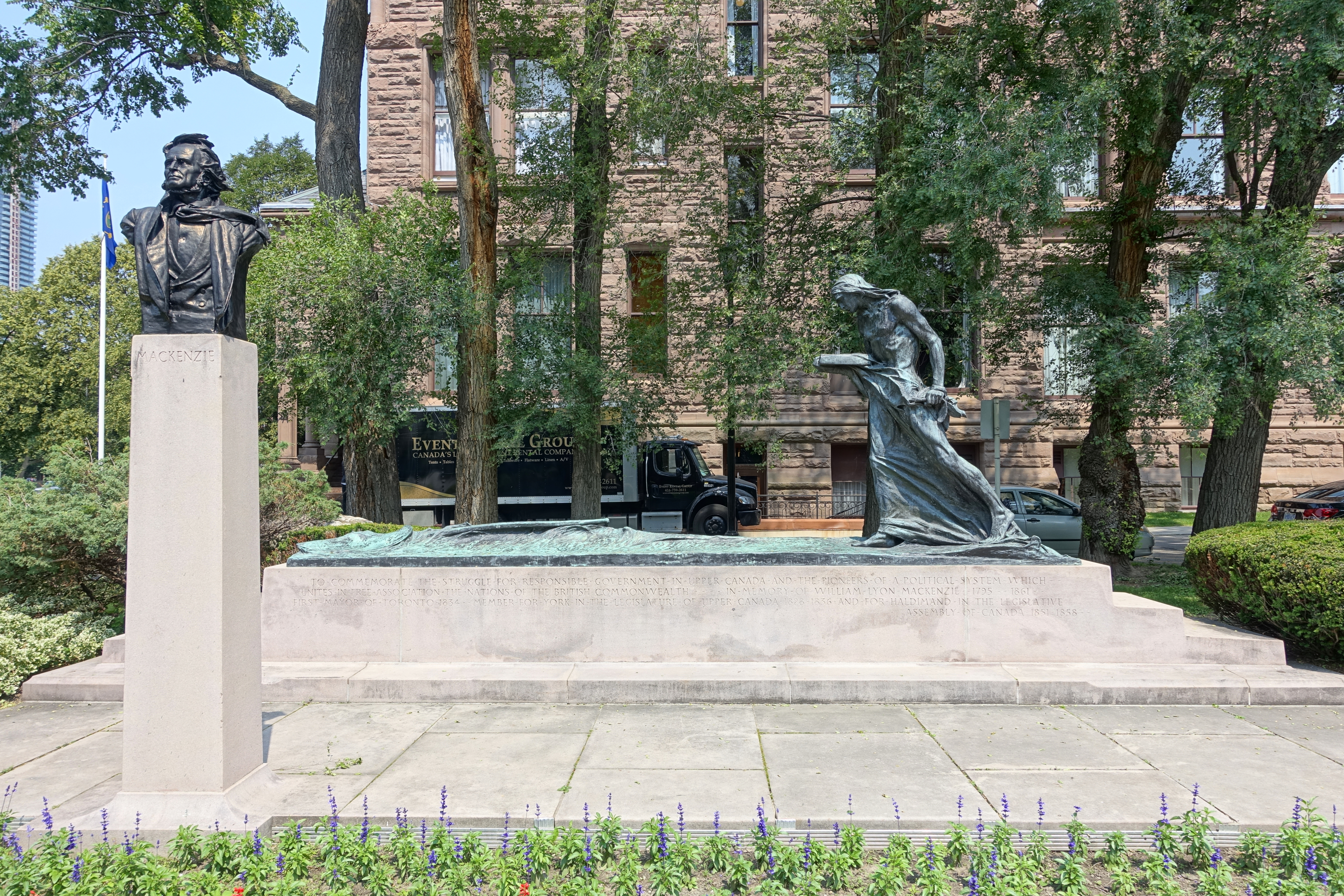
- The monument in 2015
- Interactive map of William Lyon Mackenzie Monument
- Coordinates: 43°39′45.2″N 79°23′34.1″W

A statue of William Lyon Mackenzie is installed in Toronto's Queen's Park, in Ontario, Canada.

== Description and history ==
The front features a bust of Mackenzie from his chest to head, 1.2 metres (3.9 ft) high, 70 centimetres (28 in) wide, and 45 centimetres (18 in) thick. Behind the bust is a bronze tableau that is 6.35 metres (20.8 ft) long, 88 centimetres (35 in) wide, and 1 metre (3.3 ft) tall, which runs parallel to the legislative building. On one end of the tableau stands a toga-clad, bent human figure standing 2.45 metres (8.0 ft) tall clutching a law book.
