= Ontario Police Memorial =

Monument in Toronto, Ontario, Canada

- The memorial in 2026
- Interactive map of Ontario Police Memorial
- Coordinates: 43°39′44.6″N 79°23′23.4″W

The Ontario Police Memorial is located in Toronto's Queen's Park, in Ontario, Canada. The monument was dedicated in 2000.

== Description and history ==
Designed by Siggy Puchta, the memorial features two figures atop a granite plinth: a male police officer in 1950s duty dress and a female police officer in 2000s duty dress. The monument includes a list of names, in random order, of every Ontario police officer who died while serving the public. As of 2008, 234 names were added to the wall. The memorial has 281 names inscribed on it, as of the 2024 Ceremony of Remembrance. The earliest name recorded on the memorial is that of Constable John Fisk, who drowned in Lake Ontario in 1804 when the vessel he was using to transport a prisoner sank during a storm.
