= 48th Highlanders of Canada Regimental Memorial =

Monument in Toronto, Ontario, Canada

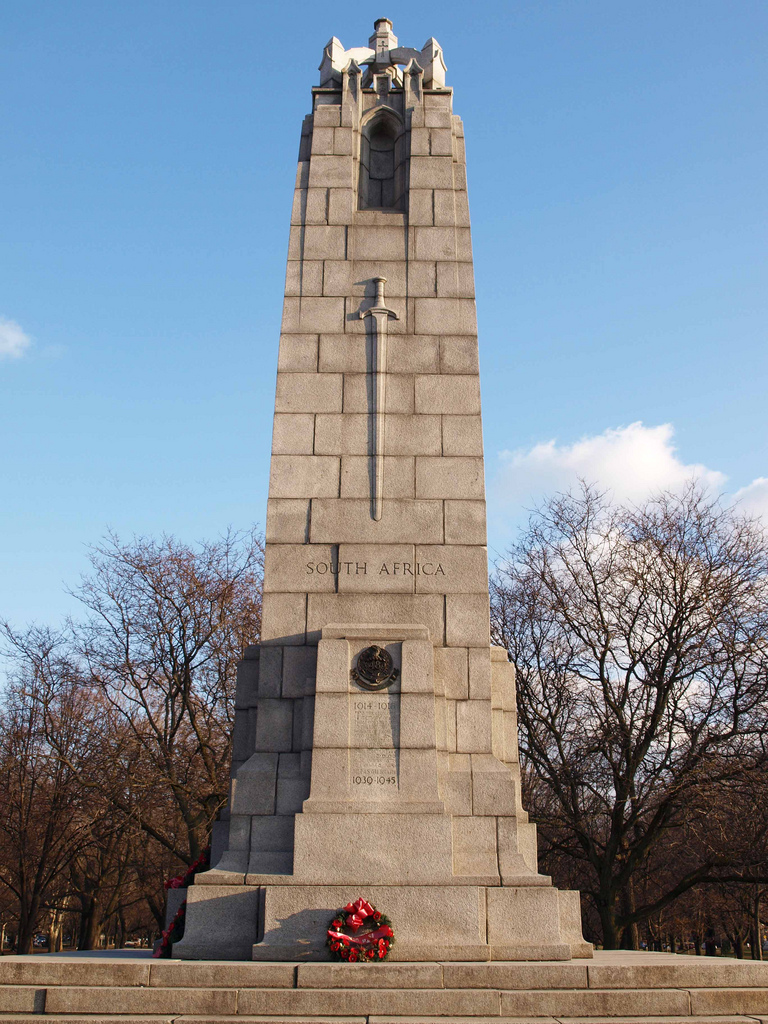
- The memorial in 2010
- Interactive map of 48th Highlanders of Canada Regimental Memorial
- Location: Toronto, Ontario, Canada
- Coordinates: 43°39′57″N 79°23′34.6″W

The 48th Highlanders of Canada Regimental Memorial is a monument in Toronto's Queen's Park, in Ontario, Canada. The monument was erected in 1923.

== Description and history ==
The memorial was designed by two architects, Eric Haldenby and Alvan Mathers and features a 12 metres (39 ft) high white granite shaft, with four niches at its top and an open dome as its capstone. The north side of the monument features an inscription that reads "swords of sacrifice" on the monument's bas-relief, with a list of engagements that the regiment was involved in during the Second Boer War listed below the inscription. Regimental battle honours from the First World War are also listed on the monument's east and west face; whereas the unit's battle honours from the Second World War are inscribed on the monument's south face.
