= Northwest Rebellion Monument =

Memorial in Toronto, Ontario, Canada

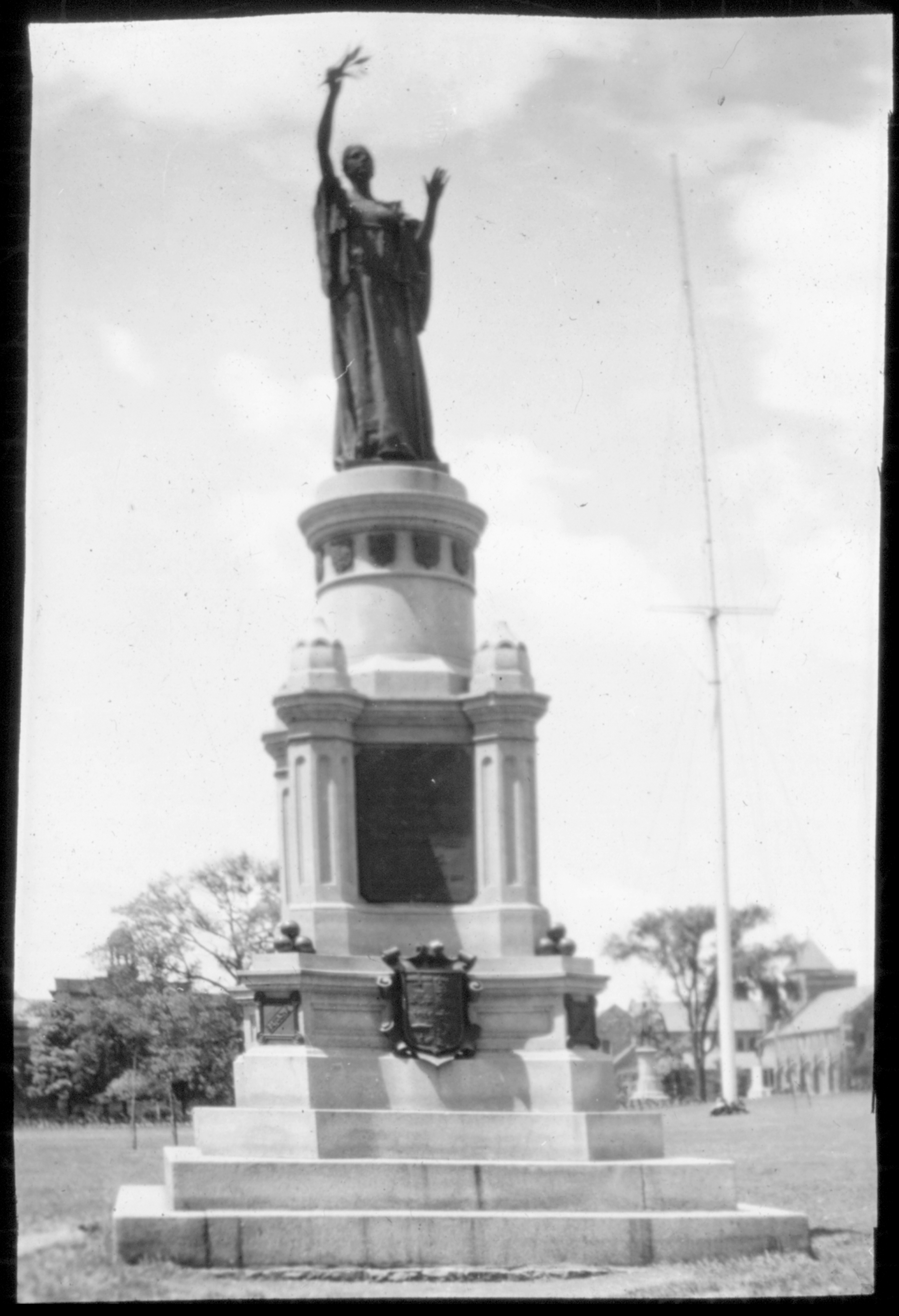
- Location: Toronto, Ontario, Canada
- 43°39′42.1″N 79°23′24.2″W

The Northwest Rebellion Monument is a memorial installed in Toronto's Queen's Park, in Ontario, Canada.

== Description and history ==
The monument features a 2.1 metres (6.9 ft) tall allegorical figure of peace holding an olive spring in one hand, and a sword in her belt. The statue was cast in bronze and is placed atop a 3.7 metres (12 ft) white granite base. Iron cannonballs are placed on the corners of the plinth, with the names of battles and war dead listed on the memorial. The memorial was sculpted by Walter Seymour Allward, and was the first publicly commissioned work he had completed. Another plaque was later added to the back of the memorial, commemorating a reunion of the conflict's veterans at the site in 1935.
