= Queen's Park (Toronto) =

Toronto park home to the Ontario Legislature

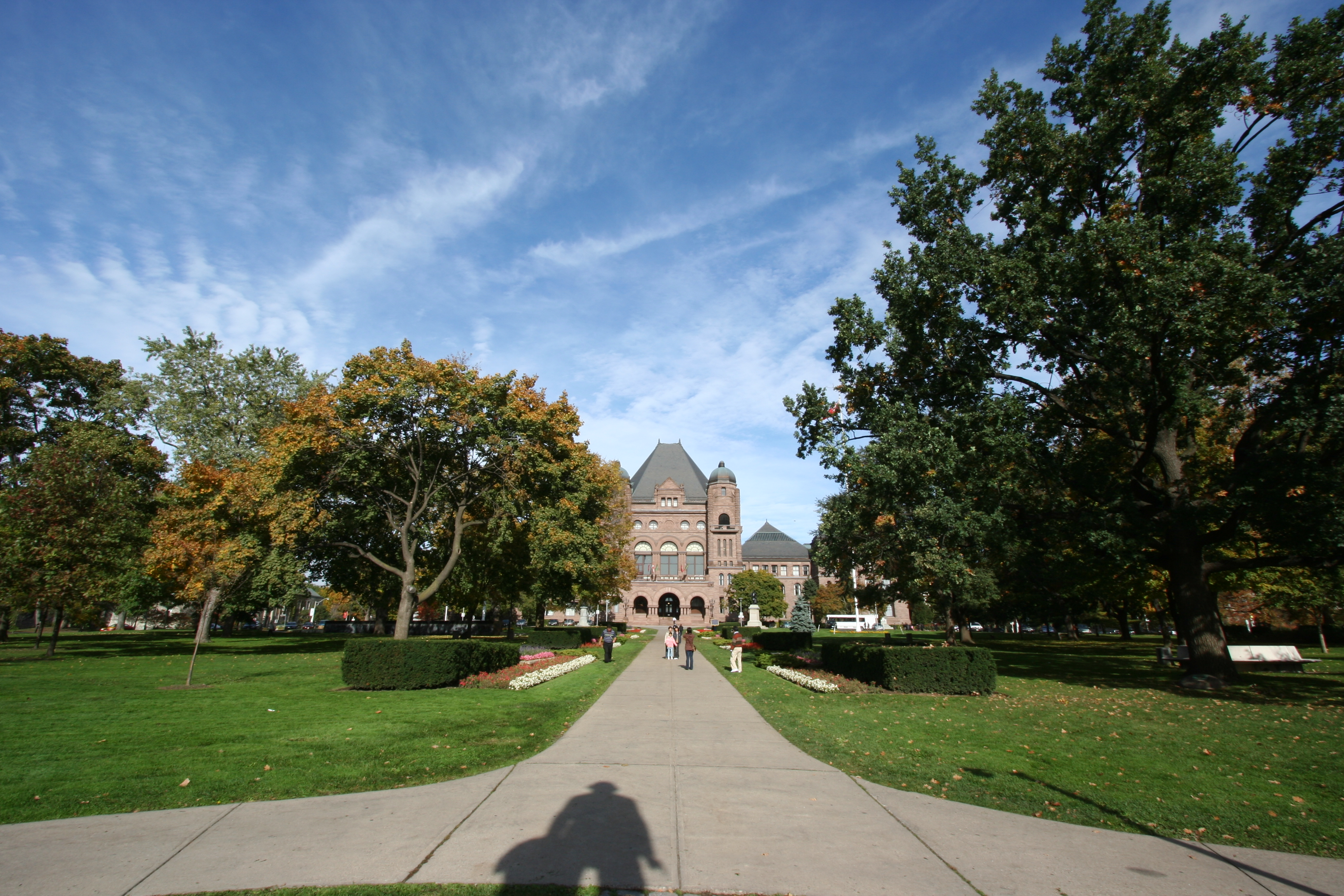
- View from the south of the park looking towards the Ontario Legislative Building
- Interactive map of Queen's Park
- Type: Municipal park
- Location: Toronto, Ontario, Canada
- Coordinates: 43.664659°N 79.392453°W
- Opened: 11 September 1860; 166 years ago
- Etymology: Queen Victoria
- Owner: University of Toronto & Government of Ontario (Note: On 29 August 1858, a 999-year lease was signed between the university and the municipal government of Toronto; where the city would lease 20 hectares (49 acres) of land from the university, present day Queen's Park. In 1886, ownership of the southern portion of the property was formally handed over to the government of Ontario.)
- Manager: Toronto Parks, Forestry and Recreation Division & the Government of Ontario (Note: The City of Toronto maintains the portion of the park north of Wellesley Street, whereas the government of Ontario maintains and owns the property south of Wellesley Street.)
- Paths: 3 bicycle trails
- Public transit: Queen's Park; Museum; 506

Queen's Park is an urban park in downtown Toronto, Ontario, Canada. Opened in 1860 by Edward, Prince of Wales, it was named in honour of Queen Victoria. The park is the site of the Ontario Legislative Building, which houses the Legislative Assembly of Ontario. The phrase "Queen's Park" is often used metonymically to refer to the Government of Ontario and the Legislative Assembly of Ontario.

The park is nearly an enclave of the University of Toronto's St. George campus, which occupies most of the surrounding lands. In 1859, the land was leased by the University of Toronto to the City of Toronto government for a 999-year term. In 1880, a "portion of the Queen's Park [was] selected [and given to] the Government of Ontario, as a site for the erection of new Legislative and Departmental buildings". The land that is occupied by the Legislative Assembly of Ontario is owned by the Government of Ontario. The north park is owned by the University of Toronto and leased to the city. Ministry buildings of the Ontario government occupy other properties to the east of the park, in an area between Wellesley Street and Grosvenor Street.

== History ==
Shortly after King's College (later renamed the University of Toronto) was established in 1827, the institution purchased 68 hectares (170 acres) from two farming estates north of the Town of York (present-day Toronto), including present day Queen's Park.

This was part of the 150 acres (61 ha) from portions of three park lots:

- North Half of Park Lot 11 from Mary Elmsley (John Elmsley's estate was sold by his wife Mary Hallowell after his death in 1805)
- North half of Park Lot 12 from William Dummer Powell
- North half of Park Lot 13 from D'Arcy Boulton

The cornerstone for one of the college's earliest buildings was laid at the site on 23 April 1842. The building was built on the present site of the east wing of the Ontario Legislative Building, and was completed in 1843; although it remained vacant until 1845. The building was initially planned to be the southeast wing for a larger building, although these additional wings were never built as a result of budget shortfalls. The building was situated within a landscaped park surrounded by tree-lined avenues, and was accessed through two gates to the north and south. While the university occupied the property it was known as University Park.

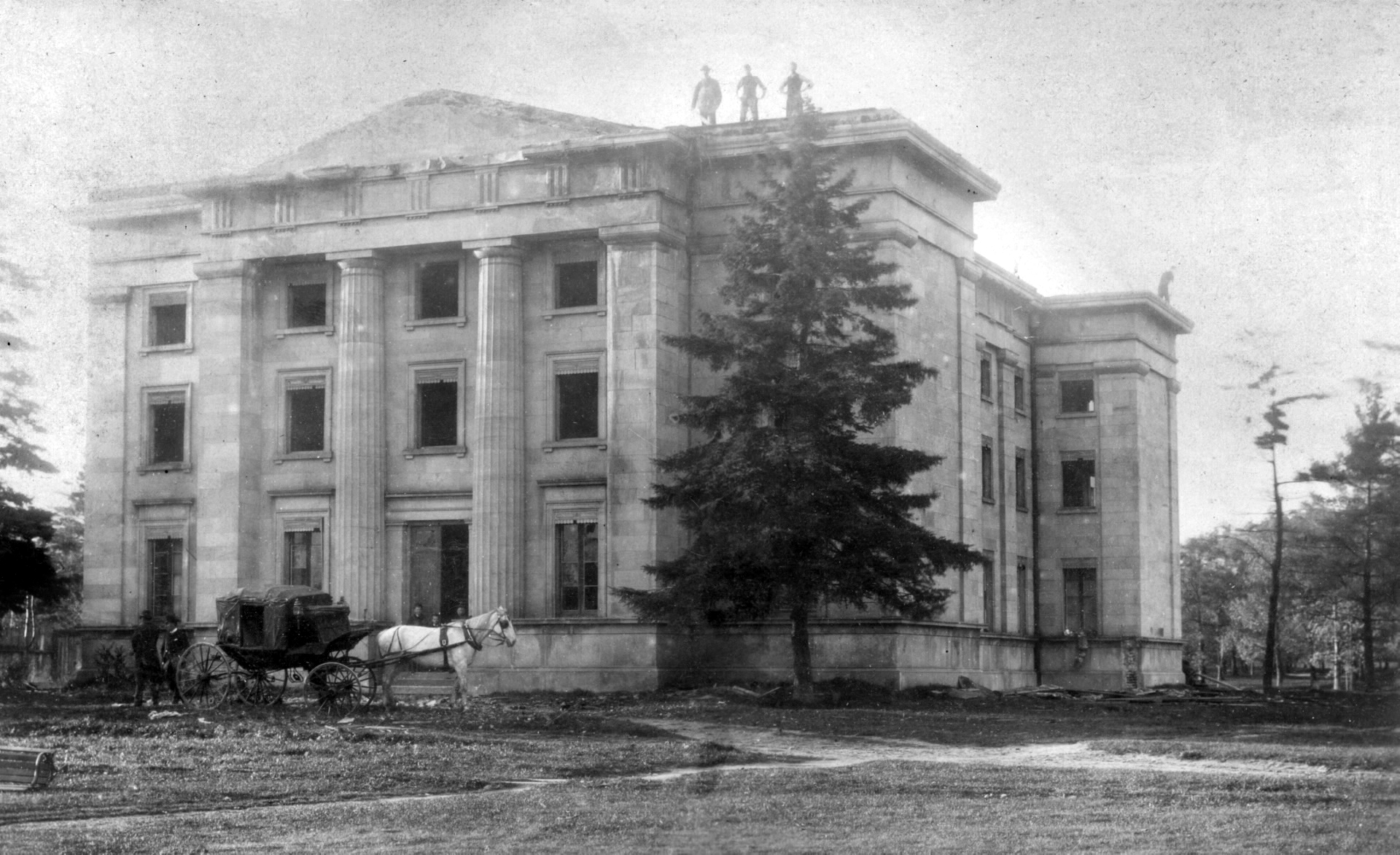
Photo of the building formerly used by King's College (later the University of Toronto) in 1855, at present-day Queen's Park

In 1853, the Parliament of the Province of Canada expropriated the building for its use; with the University of Toronto relocating classes held in that building to the Third Parliament Buildings of Upper Canada. The Parliament of the Province of Canada was based in Toronto from 1849 to 1853 and again from 1856 to 1858; having relocated several times within the Province of Canada during its existence.

Given the park's popularity with local residents, the municipal government of Toronto entered negotiations with the university to lease the land for the purposes of creating a public park; with a 999-year lease for 20 hectares (49 acres) of land eventually formalized on 29 August 1858. The terms of the lease also outlined that the government had the right to build a legislative building on the property if they so desired.

On 11 September 1860, the property was officially dedicated as Canada's first municipal park by Edward, Prince of Wales (later King Edward VII); and was named Queen's Park, in honour of Queen Victoria. The park was originally planned to be opened the previous Saturday, although heavy rain led the dedication ceremony to be rescheduled to Tuesday. During the ceremony, he also laid a cornerstone for an eventual statue of Queen Victoria at the southern apex of the park. However, financial difficulties and delays would eventually see this spot be occupied by a statue of Sir John A. Macdonald, the first prime minister of Canada. The statue for Victoria would eventually be purchased and placed near the entrance to the legislative building in 1902.

In 1879, the provincial government acted on its option to construct a new legislature on the property and informed the city of its intention to do so. However, construction was delayed by inconclusive design competition, with the design commission finally awarded in 1886 to Richard A. Waite. Ownership of the southern portion of the park was also handed over to the provincial government in 1886. The Ontario Legislative Building was completed in 1892, and hosted its first legislative session on 4 April 1893. After the building's completion, Russian cannons originally placed at the southern tip of the park in 1859 were moved to the legislature's entrance. The Russian cannons were war prizes captured by British forces during the Crimean War, and gifted to the city of Toronto by Queen Victoria in 1859.

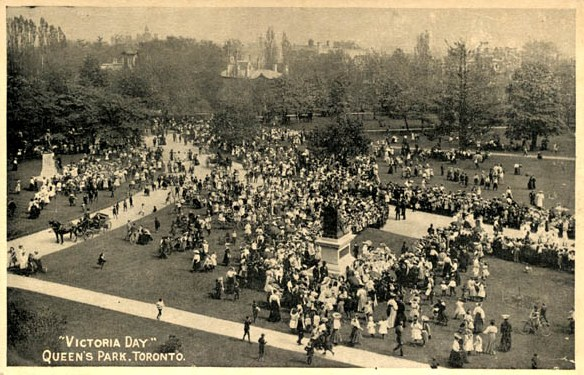
Victoria Day celebrations at Queen's Park in 1910

Although the new legislative building split the park into two sections, local residents continued to congregate there for concerts, memorial services, military parades, and political gatherings. During the late-19th century, the northern portion of Queen's Park also hosted a public speakers' forum on Sunday. During the First World War, the park was used as a gathering point for soldiers of the Canadian Expeditionary Force.

In 1984, Queen's Park hosted two tree planting ceremonies for the eastern white pine, after it was declared the province's official tree that year. The first tree planting ceremony took place on 25 May 1984 by Bob Welch, the deputy premier of Ontario in order to commemorate Arbour Day. The second tree planting ceremony also took place that year at the same location, with Queen Elizabeth II and the then-Duke of Edinburgh planting two eastern white pines on 29 September 1984. A plaque marks the spot of the tree plantings, and the trees that grew from it.

In the early 2000s, Canadian poet Dennis Lee and poet advocate Richard Griffin led a campaign to erect a statue of Al Purdy, another Canadian poet, on the grounds of Queen's Park. The campaign specifically insisted that the statue should be located at Queen's Park, in order to demonstrate the significance of poetry and the arts in Canada's cultural life. The statue was eventually built and unveiled in 2008, making it the first statue at Queen's Park that commemorates an individual that was not a political figure or monarch.

== Layout ==
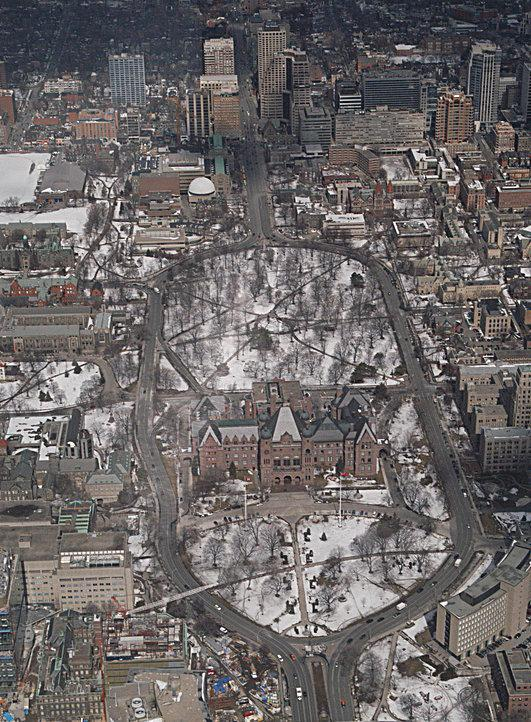
Aerial view of Queen's Park. The park is split into two sections by Wellesley Street

The shape of Queen's Park is similar to an oval, although the southwestern edge of Queens Park "kinks in" somewhat. The "kink" in the southwestern edge formed the former bank of Taddle Creek, a waterway underground. The oval park is bounded by Queen's Park Crescent East and West. These form part of a major through route consist of University Avenue (south of College Street), Queen's Park Crescent East and West, Queen's Park, and Avenue Road (north of Bloor Street). Queen's Park Crescent East and West carry northbound and southbound traffic respectively and are linked to make a complete counterclockwise loop around the park. University Avenue, Queen's Park (with no suffix), and Avenue Road have two-way traffic and lie in essentially the same straight line. Wellesley Street bisects Queen's Park Crescent slightly north of the loop's centre.

The portion of the park north of Wellesley Street is maintained by the Toronto Parks, Forestry and Recreation Division and includes a number of benches along paving stones, and picnic tables. The section follows the traditional British design, dominated by large trees that provide extensive cover during summer. The pathways radiate outwards from an equestrian statue of Edward VII, which stands on a large mound at the centre of the northern section. The main north-south path runs between the equestrian statue and the 48th Highlanders of Canada Regimental Memorial at the park's northern tip. The north section of Queen's Park is the 'saluting station' for the Province of Ontario. Gun salutes are conducted here to mark special occasions including Victoria Day (fired at 1200 EDT), Canada Day (fired at 1200 EDT), and Remembrance Day (fired at 1102 EST). Other salutes are also conducted here throughout the year as dictated by protocol.

The portion of Queen's Park south of Wellesley Street is maintained by the provincial government and includes the Ontario Legislative Building south of Wellesley Street, the parking lot to the south of the building, and the remaining portions of the park. In contrast to the northern portion of the Queen's Park, minimal landscaping was done to the southern portion of the park. However, the southern portion of the park includes the majority of the monuments and memorials in the park, and its gardens.

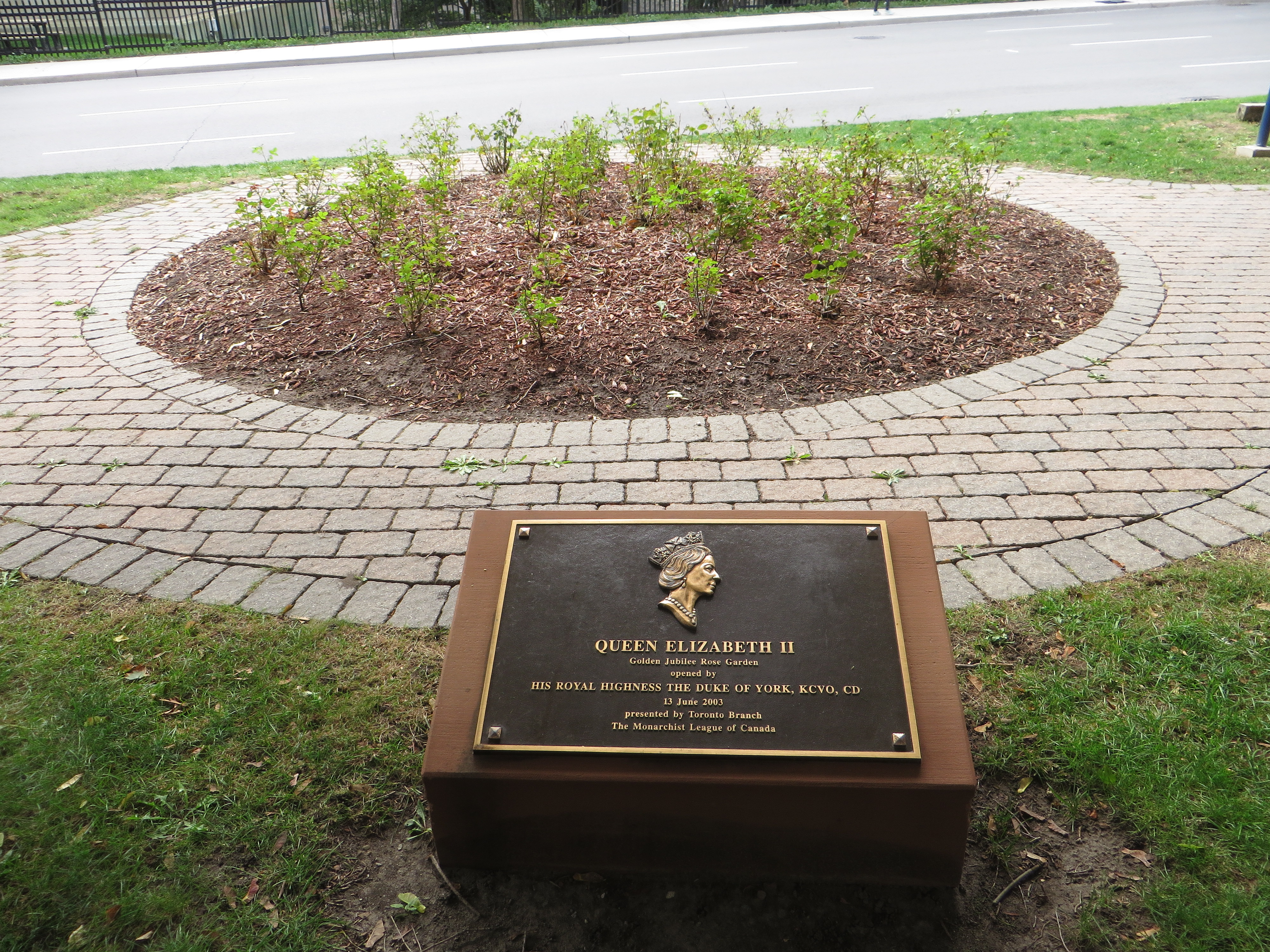
A rose garden on the southwestern half of park, planted to mark Queen Elizabeth II's golden jubilee

The first portion of the Queen Elizabeth II rose gardens was dedicated in 1977, to mark the silver jubilee of Elizabeth II. An extension to the garden was added in 2003 to mark the Queen's golden jubilee. A platinum jubilee garden featuring tobacco plants from Massey College's Chapel Royal was unveiled in 2022 to mark the Queen's platinum jubilee. The gardens also feature the first plaque in the park that recognizes the area as Treaty 13 territory. The southern portion of the park also includes the "White Trillium Garden", a garden that is landscaped with white trilliums, the official floral emblem of the province. There also exists a native species garden, a garden primarily landscaped with vegetation native to the area, including eastern white cedars, hackberries, and some perennial flowers. The southern tip of the park facing University Avenue features the statue of Sir John A. Macdonald, the first prime minister of Canada.

=== Geography ===
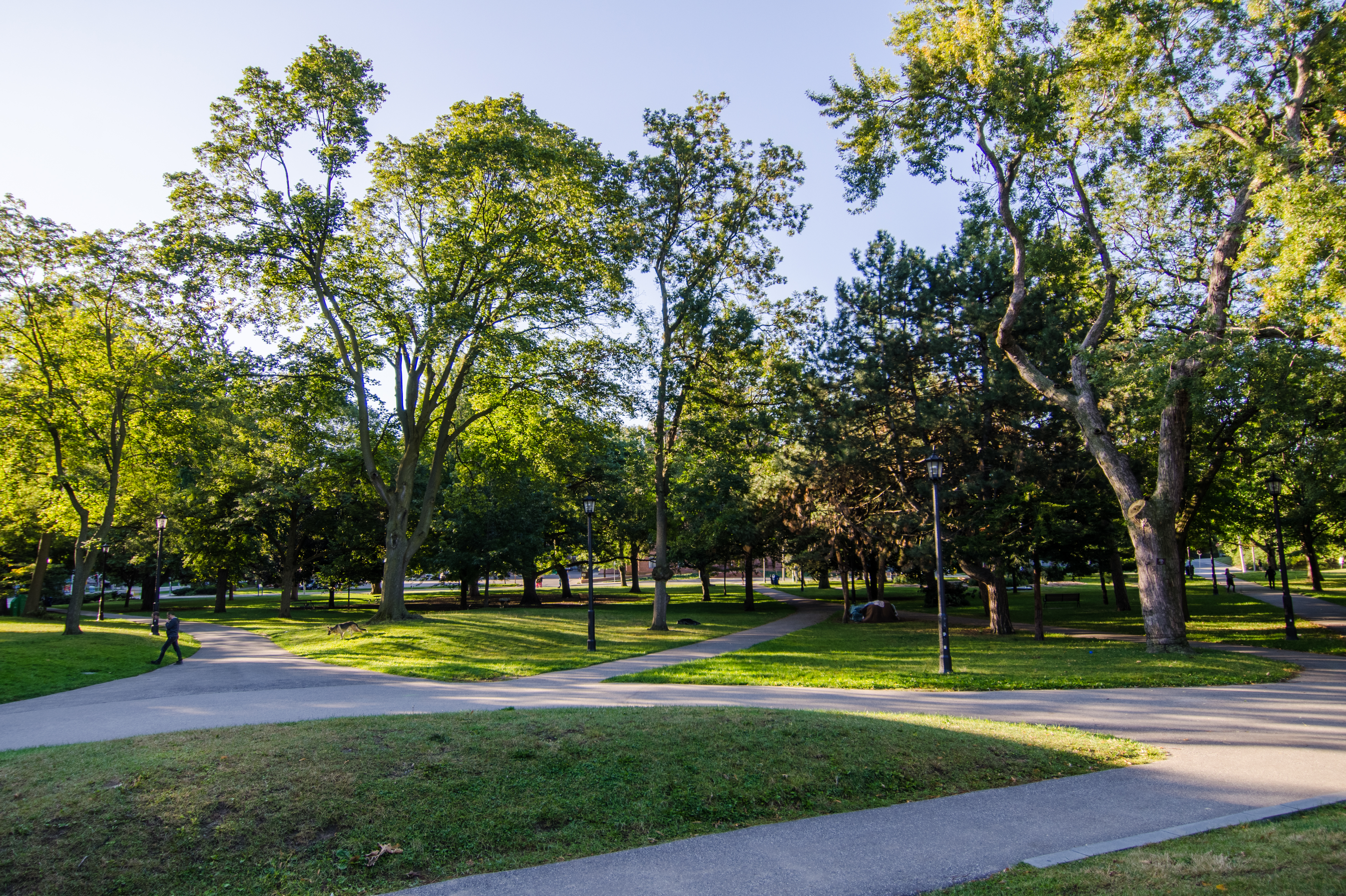
View of the northern section of Queen's Park. The park includes a variety of non-native and native trees of Toronto.

Queen's Park is situated on top of sandy sediment, having been deposited there when the area was the floor bed for Glacial Lake Iroquois. Initially, the area was covered with eastern white pine, northern red oak, and white oak trees. However, because a number of non-native trees from Europe were planted around the area during the early 19th century, the park presently holds a large variety of trees from Europe, as well as trees native to Toronto. Attempts have been made to restore the park to resemble how it appeared prior to the introduction of non-native species through the planting of additional trees native to the area.

=== Transit access ===
Line 1 Yonge-University of the Toronto subway runs below University Avenue, Queen's Park (the park, to one side of the legislature), and Queen's Park (the street), serving the area via its Queen's Park and Museum stations. Other public transit access is provided by the 13 Avenue Road and 94 Wellesley bus routes, and the 506 Carlton streetcar route.

== Memorials and monuments ==
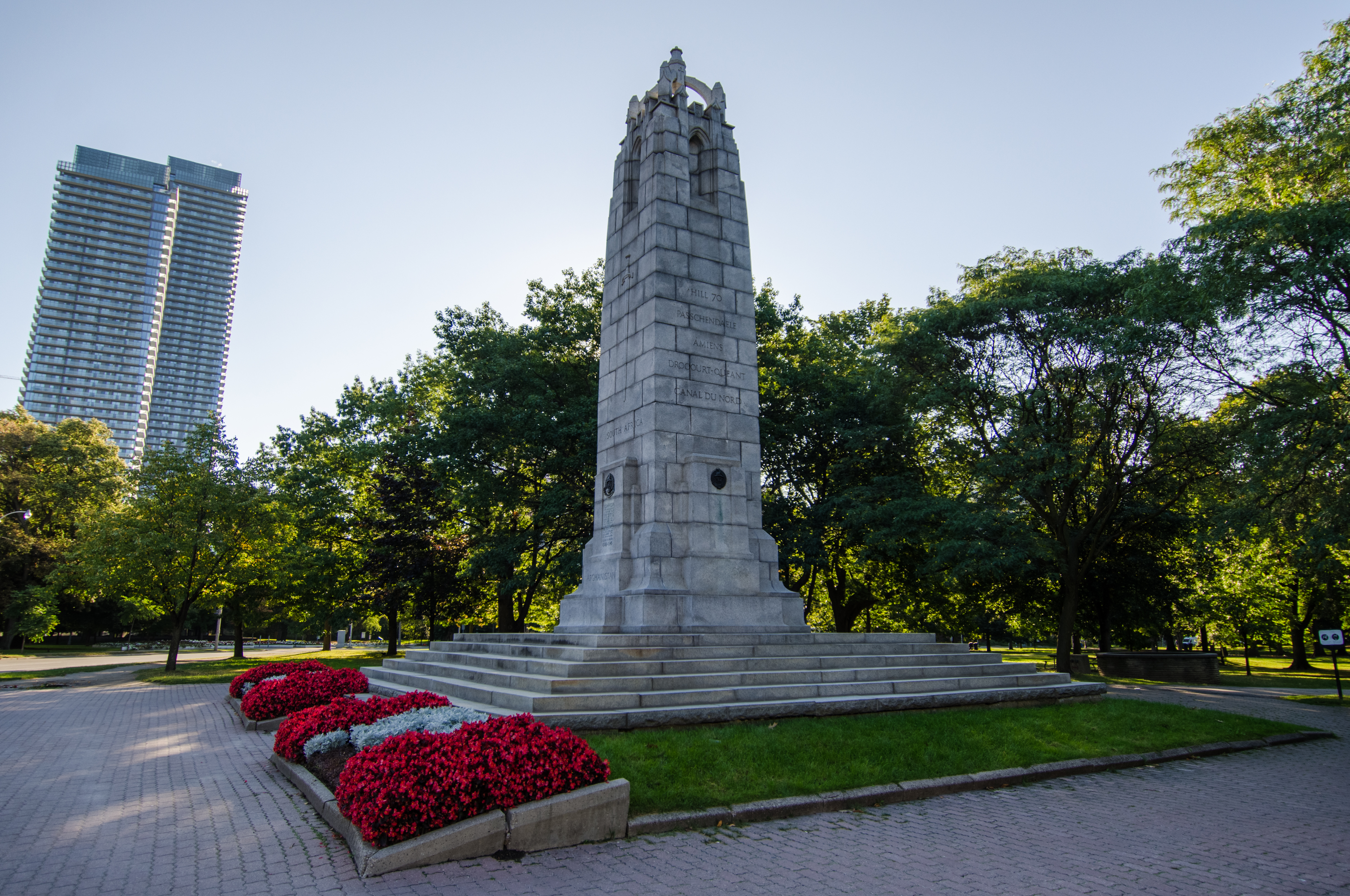
The 48th Highlanders of Canada Regimental Memorial, situated at the northern point of the park.

Queen's Park holds a number of monuments and war memorials to commemorate events and/or individuals. Most of them were erected during the late 19th- to early 20th century, although there are several memorials that were erected in the late-20th and early 21st century. Monuments at the park come in a variety of forms, including a number of full-length statues of persons. Several monuments are also located adjacent to Queen's Park.

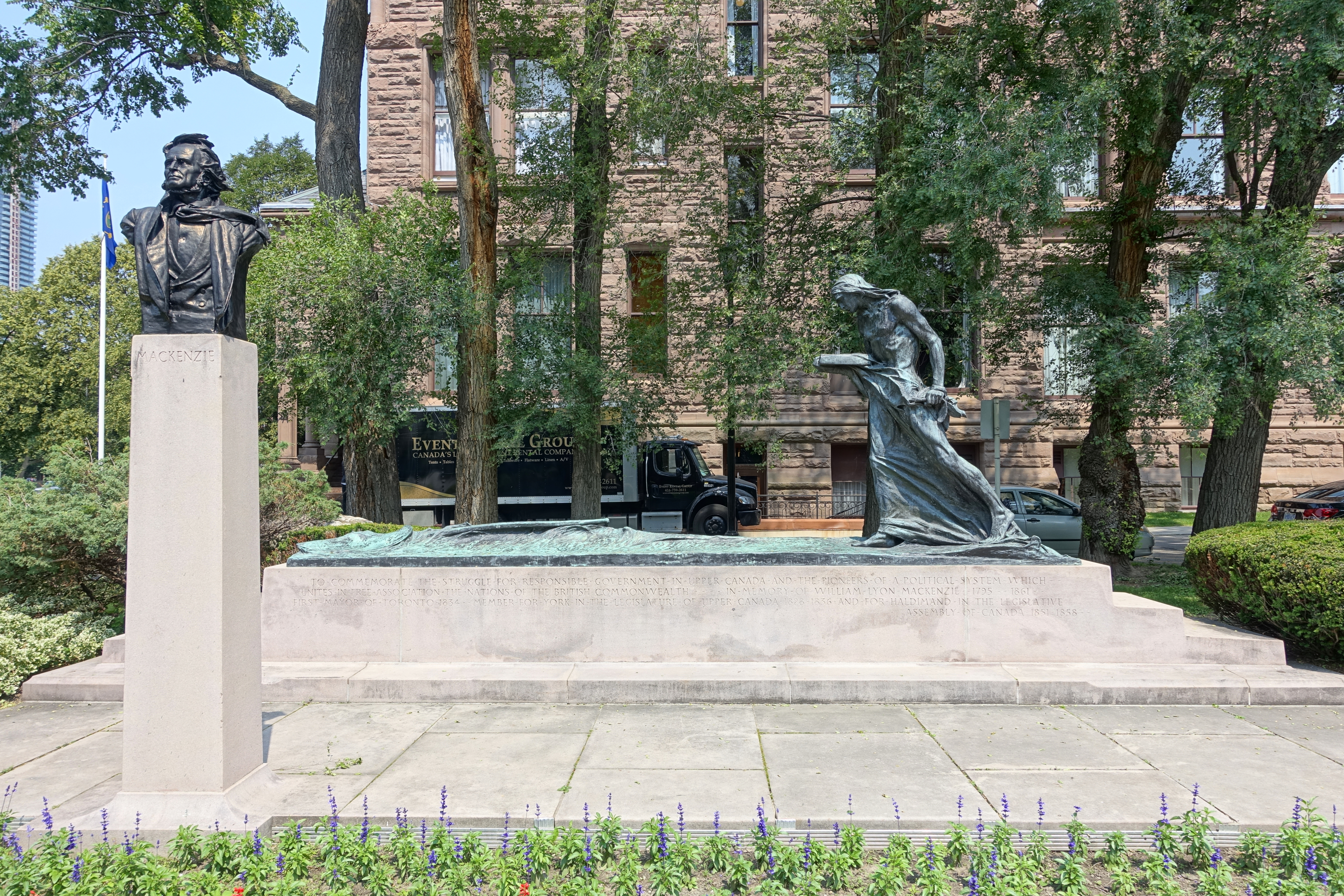
The William Lyon Mackenzie Monument is a two-part sculpture that includes the bust of William Lyon Mackenzie and a toga-clad, bent human holding a law book behind him.

The park's first memorial was the Canadian Volunteer Monument. (Note: The monument was originally located in Queen's Park, although it was later severed from the rest of the park with the construction of Queen's Park Crescent.) Unveiled in 1870, it is the second oldest monument in Toronto. Sculpted by Robert Reid, it was dedicated to Toronto residents that fought during the Battle of Ridgeway. A second war memorial was erected in 1895, the Northwest Rebellion Monument. The monument commemorated members of the Canadian Militia and the North-West Mounted Police who fought during the North-West Rebellion. Near the northern apex of Queen's Park is the 48th Highlanders of Canada Regimental Memorial, erected in 1923. In 1940, the Mackenzie monument was unveiled, commemorating William Lyon Mackenzie, as well as the establishment of responsible government in the Province of Canada. The monument and bust were sculpted by Walter Seymour Allward. In 1967, the government of Ontario unveiled the Post One Monument, commemorating the Canadian Centennial.

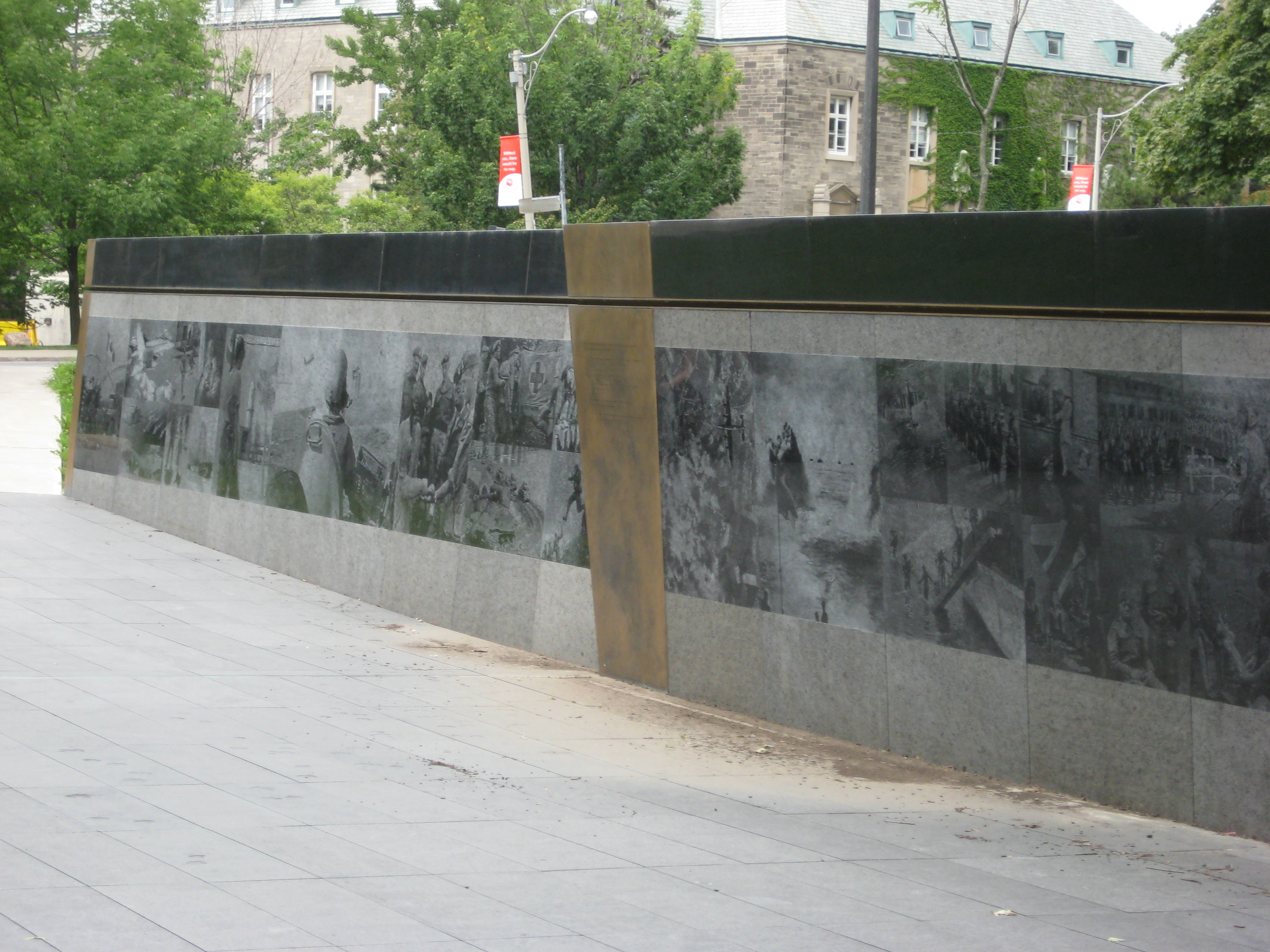
The Ontario Veterans' Memorial is dedicated to Canadian military service members from Ontario.

The Ontario Veterans' Memorial was unveiled on 17 September 2006 and commemorates Ontarians who participated in a military campaign with the Canadian military from Canadian Confederation to the present. The monument is 2.2 metres (7.2 ft) tall on both ends, although it slopes into a central gathering area. The monument is a 30-metre-long (98 ft) granite wall with 44 images depicting Canada's military history etched into the 24 grey granite panels. Conflicts depicted in these images includes the Fenian raids, North-West Rebellion, Second Boer War, First World War, Second World War, Korean War, and various peacekeeping and support operations during the Cold War, and war in Afghanistan. The monument is topped-off by a 66-centimetre-wide (26 in) black granite. A plaque situated next to the seating area provides a brief recount of Ontario's military history, from the War of 1812 to the war in Afghanistan. The memorial was designed by Allan Harding Mackay and landscaping firm Phillips Farevaag Smallenberg; Ontarian-born historian Jack Granatstein wrote the historical text and choose the images, while Ontarian-born poet Jane Urquhart wrote the monumental inscription.

Near the southern tip of the park on the pathway towards the legislative building, there also exist two plaques affixed to boulders. The first boulder was installed in 1935, commemorating the silver jubilee of King George V; whereas the second boulder serves as a memorial for the victims of the Air India Flight 182 bombing in 1985. Another large boulder with a plaque affixed to it is situated northeast of the Mackenzie monument, and commemorates Canadian volunteers of the Mackenzie–Papineau Battalion. The battalion, which partly owes its namesake to William Lyon Mackenzie, fought during the Spanish Civil War as a part of the XV International Brigade.

=== Statues of individuals ===
In addition to memorials, a number of full-body statues that commemorate individuals are also situated at Queen's Park. The majority of the statues are mounted on plinths. Most of the statues situated in the southern portion of the park face away from the legislative building, towards the south.

Figure	Portrait	Statue	Notes
George Brown			Main article: Statue of George Brown Created by Charles Bell Birch, it was unveiled in 1884. It is the first statue erected at the park that honours a historic figure.
King Edward VII			Main article: Equestrian statue of Edward VII (Toronto) Created by Thomas Brock for the 1911 Imperial Durbar, it was originally located at King Edward VII Park (now Netaji Subhash Park) in Delhi, India in 1919. It was removed in 1967, sold in 1968 with assistance from the Canadian High Commissioner to India, and re-installed in Toronto in 1969.
Queen Elizabeth II			Main article: Statue of Elizabeth II (Toronto) Created by Ruth Abernethy, the statue was unveiled in 2023.
Sir John A. Macdonald			Main article: Statue of John A. Macdonald (Toronto) Created by Hamilton MacCarthy, the statue was unveiled in 1894.
John Sandfield Macdonald			Main article: Statue of John Sandfield Macdonald Created by Walter Seymour Allward, the statue was unveiled in 1909.
Sir Oliver Mowat			Main article: Statue of Oliver Mowat Created by Walter Seymour Allward, the statue was unveiled in 1905.
Al Purdy			Main article: Statue of Al Purdy Created by Edwin and Veronica Dam de Nogales, the statue was unveiled in 2008.
John Graves Simcoe			Main article: Statue of John Graves Simcoe Created by Walter Seymour Allward, the statue was unveiled in 1903.
Queen Victoria			Main article: Statue of Queen Victoria (Toronto) Created by Mario Raggi and purchased by the Province of Ontario in 1902. Plans were made to erect the statue in 1860, with the statue's foundation laid down in 1871. The statue was shipped to Toronto in 1872, although the statue was returned after insufficient funds were raised to pay for the statue. The statue was retrieved from storage and purchased by the province after Victoria's death in 1902. The statue was finally erected in 1903.
Sir James Whitney			Main article: Statue of James Whitney Created by Hamilton MacCarthy, the statue was unveiled in 1927. Limestone, dolomite, and marble were used as building materials for the statue in order to showcase the province's natural resources. The plinth of the statue is also made of limestone, with small fossilized crinoids within the limestone.

=== Memorials adjacent to the park ===
Several monuments are built adjacent to Queen's Park, separated by roadways that surround the oval-shaped park. The Canadian Volunteer Monument is located west of Queen's Park Crescent West. Three monuments have been commissioned by the government of Ontario and have been installed in locations adjacent to the southern portion of Queen's Park. In 2000, the Siggy Puchta-designed Ontario Police Memorial was dedicated to police officers who lost their lives while serving the community. A similar memorial known as the Ontario Firefighters Memorial was also designed by Puchta and unveiled in 2005, honouring firefighters who died while serving the public. The Notre Place Monument commemorates the Franco-Ontarian community as well as the contributions the francophone community made to Ontario.

In addition to these monuments, a statue of Robert Raikes and Norman Bethune are also situated southwest of the park. The statue of Bethune was commissioned by the University of Toronto Faculty of Medicine and was unveiled in 2014.

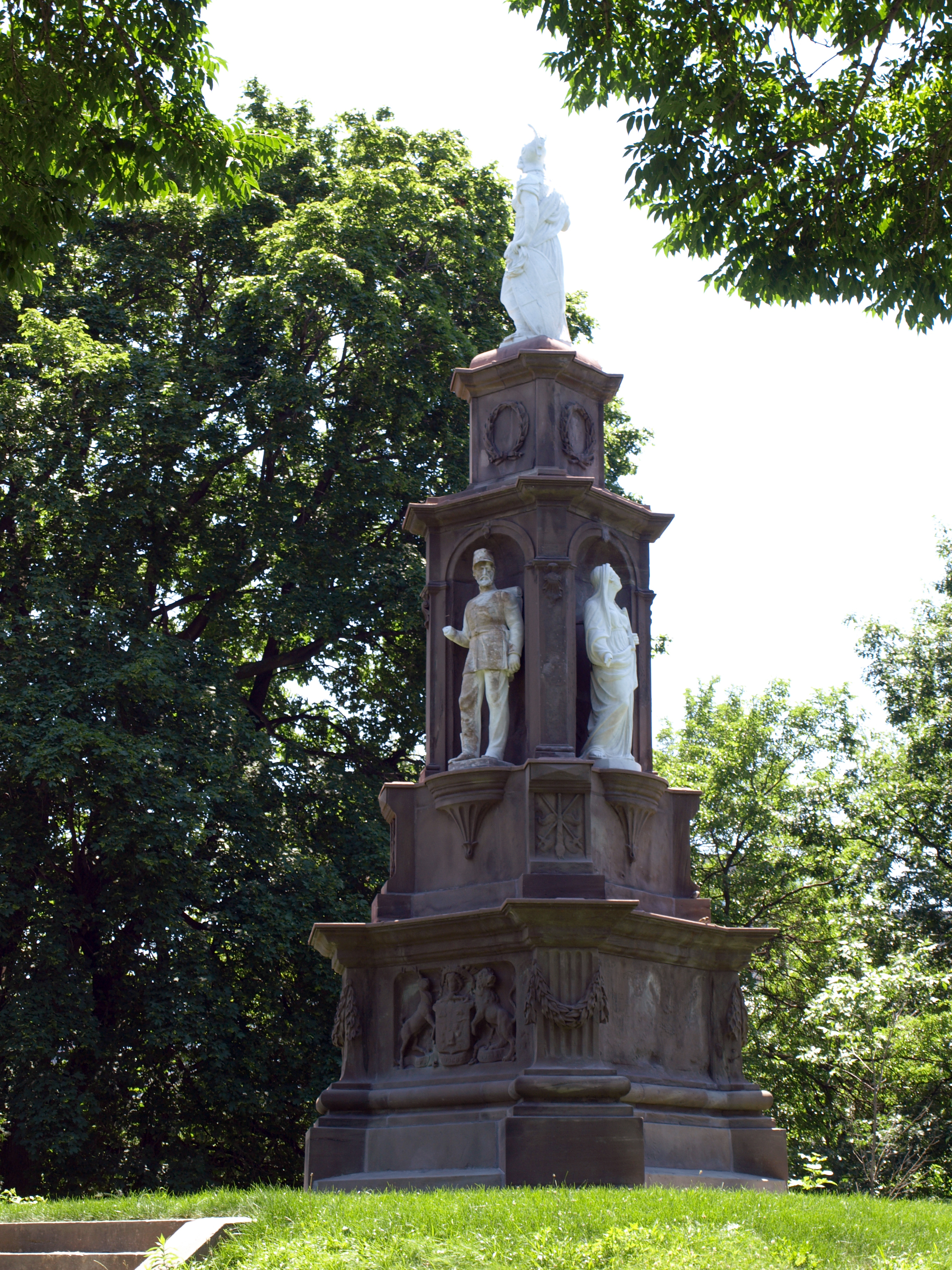
Canadian Volunteer Monument

Ontario Police Memorial

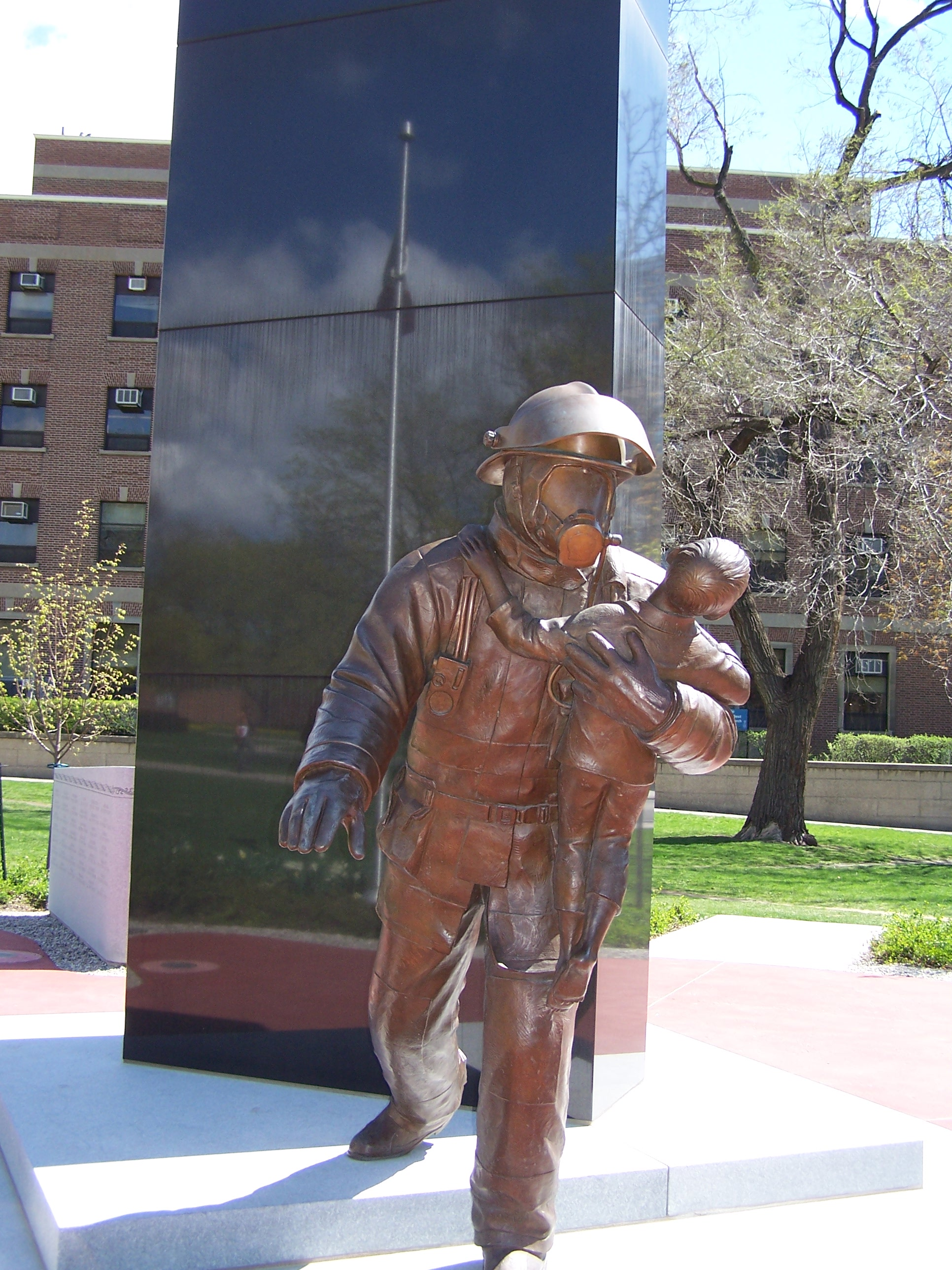
Ontario Firefighters Memorial

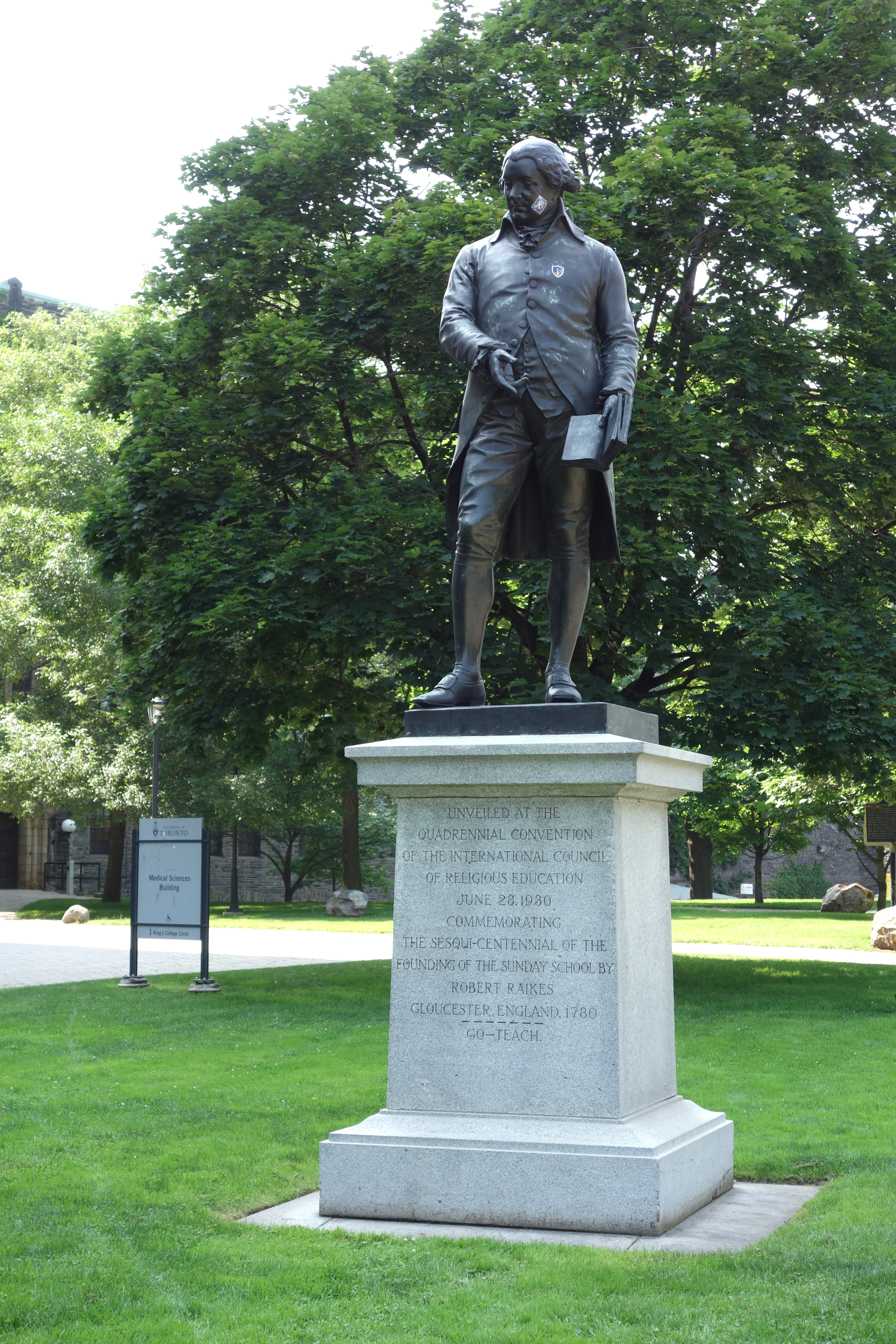
Statue of Robert Raikes

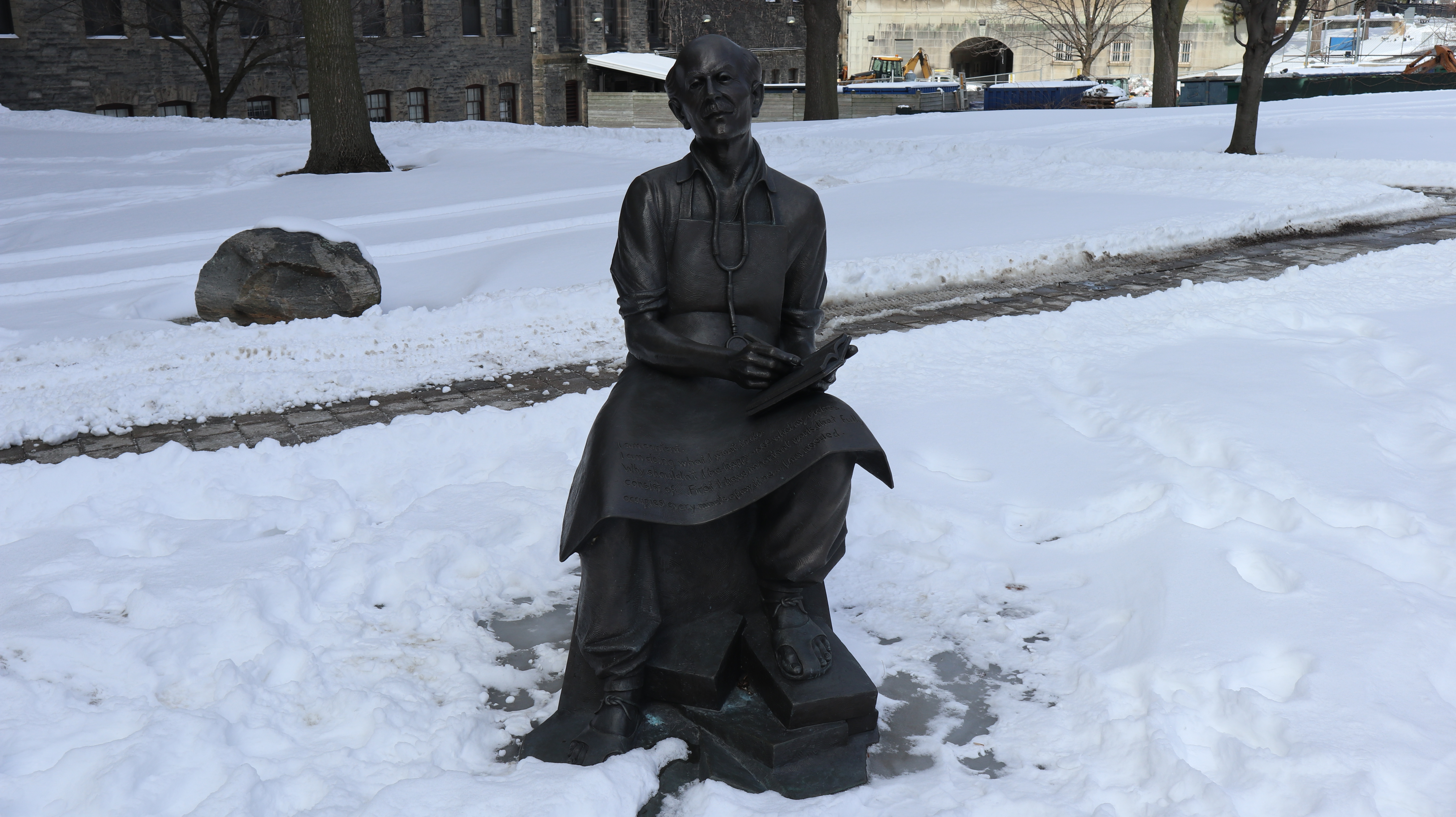
Statue of Norman Bethune

== See also ==
- Monarchy in Ontario
- Royal eponyms in Canada
- Parliament Hill
