= Post One Monument =

Monument in Toronto, Ontario, Canada

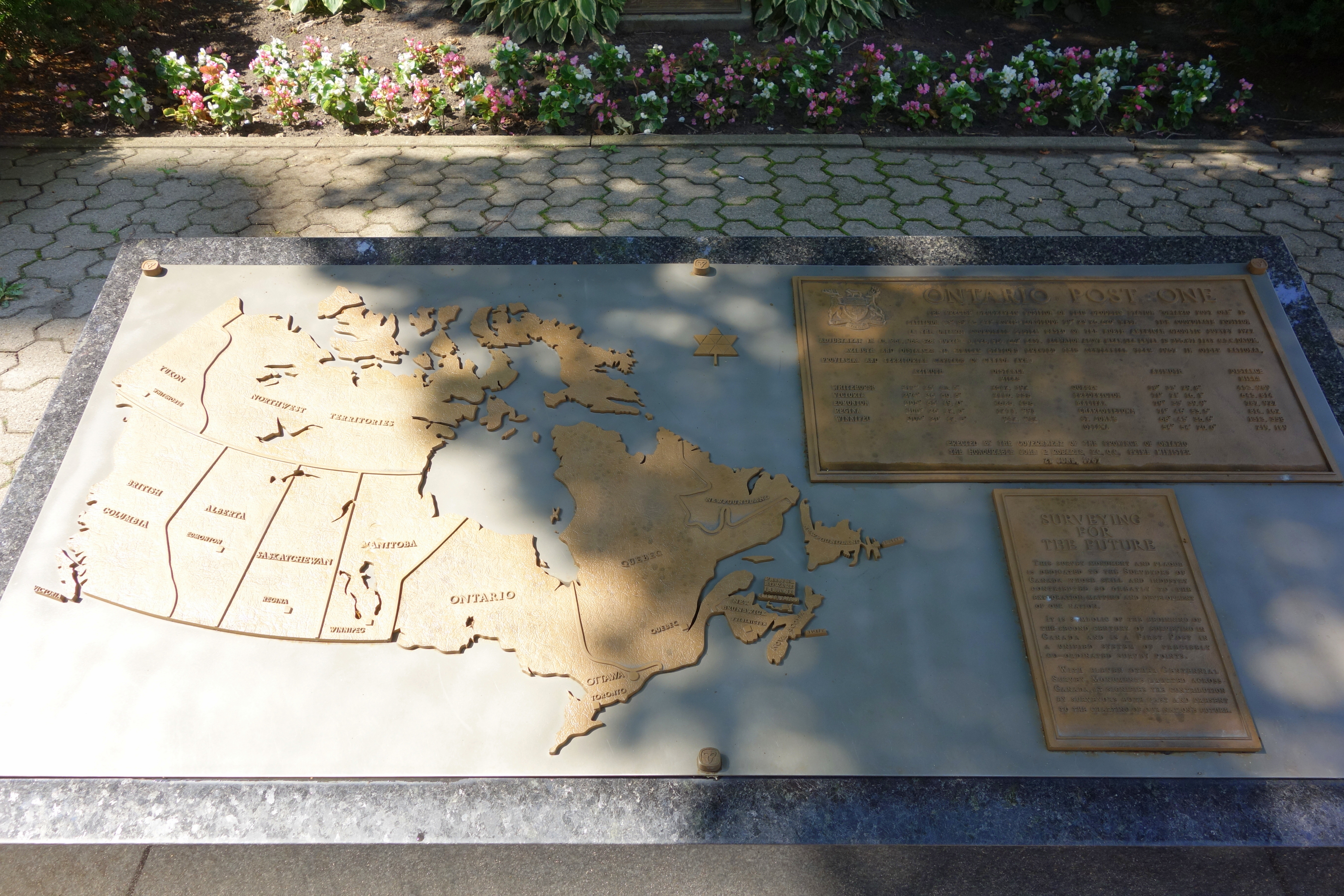
- Part of the monument in 2013
- Interactive map of Post One Monument
- Coordinates: 43°39′45.7″N 79°23′26.2″W

The Post One Monument in Toronto's Queen's Park commemorates Canada's centennial. Unveiled in 1967, the monument functions as a geodetic survey marker and has a time capsule that is slated to be opened in 2067.

== Description and history ==
The monument is a stainless-steel plate, .97 by 2.29 metres (3.2 by 7.5 ft), mounted on a flat concrete slab. A .96 by 1.46 metres (3.1 by 4.8 ft) bronze map of the country is affixed to the stainless steel plate. Similar memorials are also situated in the capitals of other Canadian provinces, with each of these monuments also having inscribed the distance from the memorials to the various provincial capitals. Surveyor tools such as survey markers were also sculpted onto the plate.

In addition to commemorating the centennial the monument, sunk in the walkway in front of the monument is a time capsule scheduled to be opened in 2067.

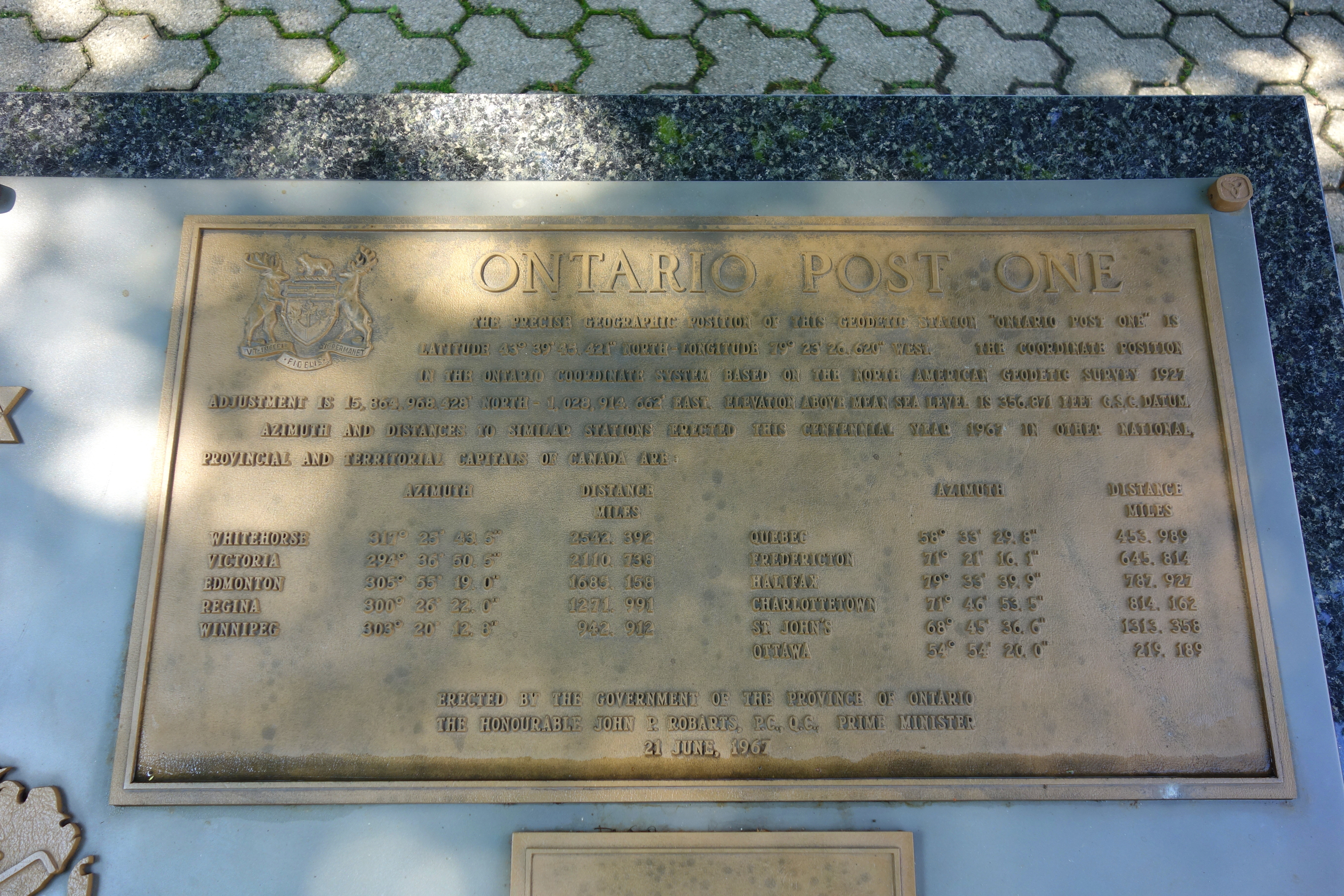

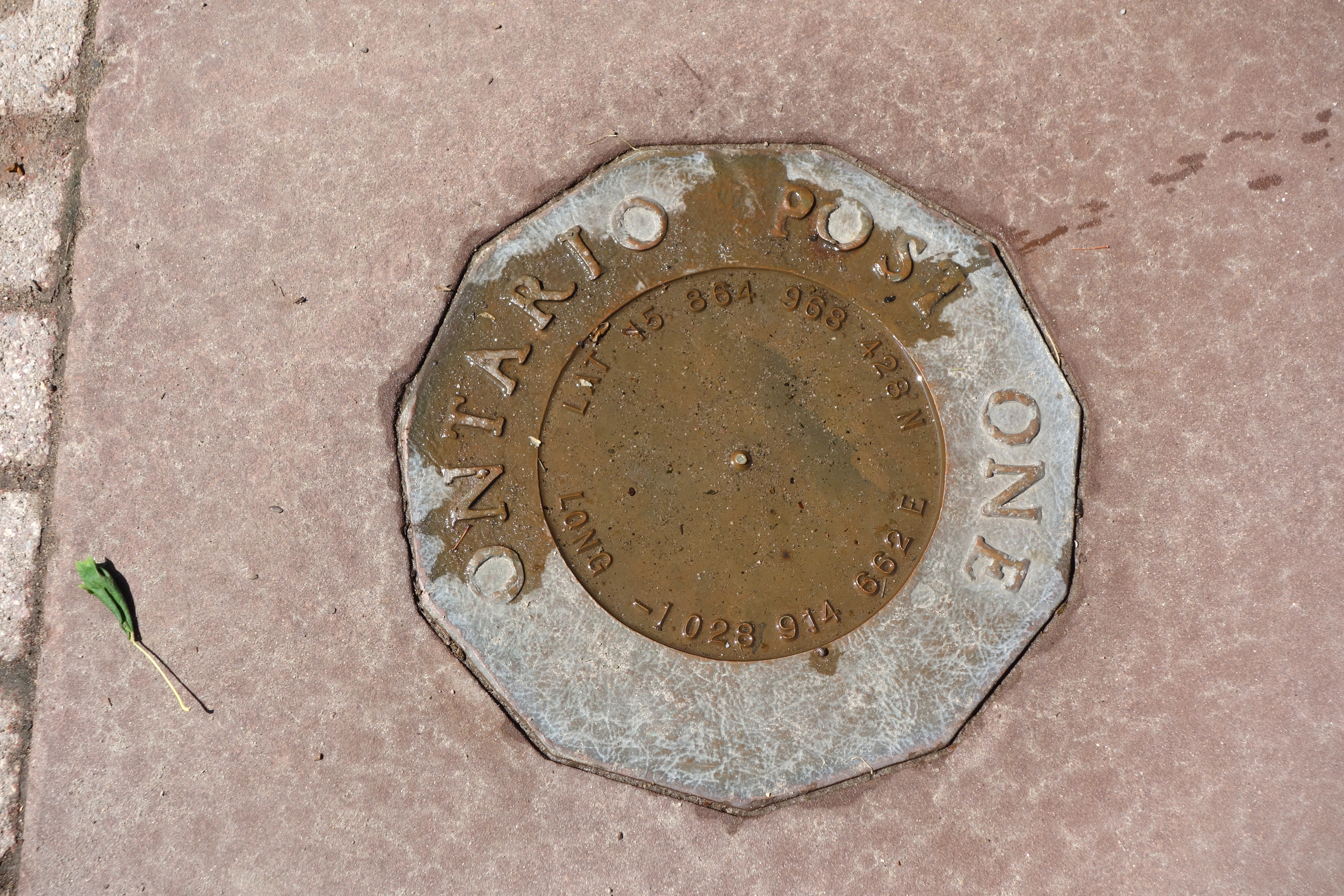
