= Statue of George Brown =

Sculpture in Toronto, Ontario, Canada

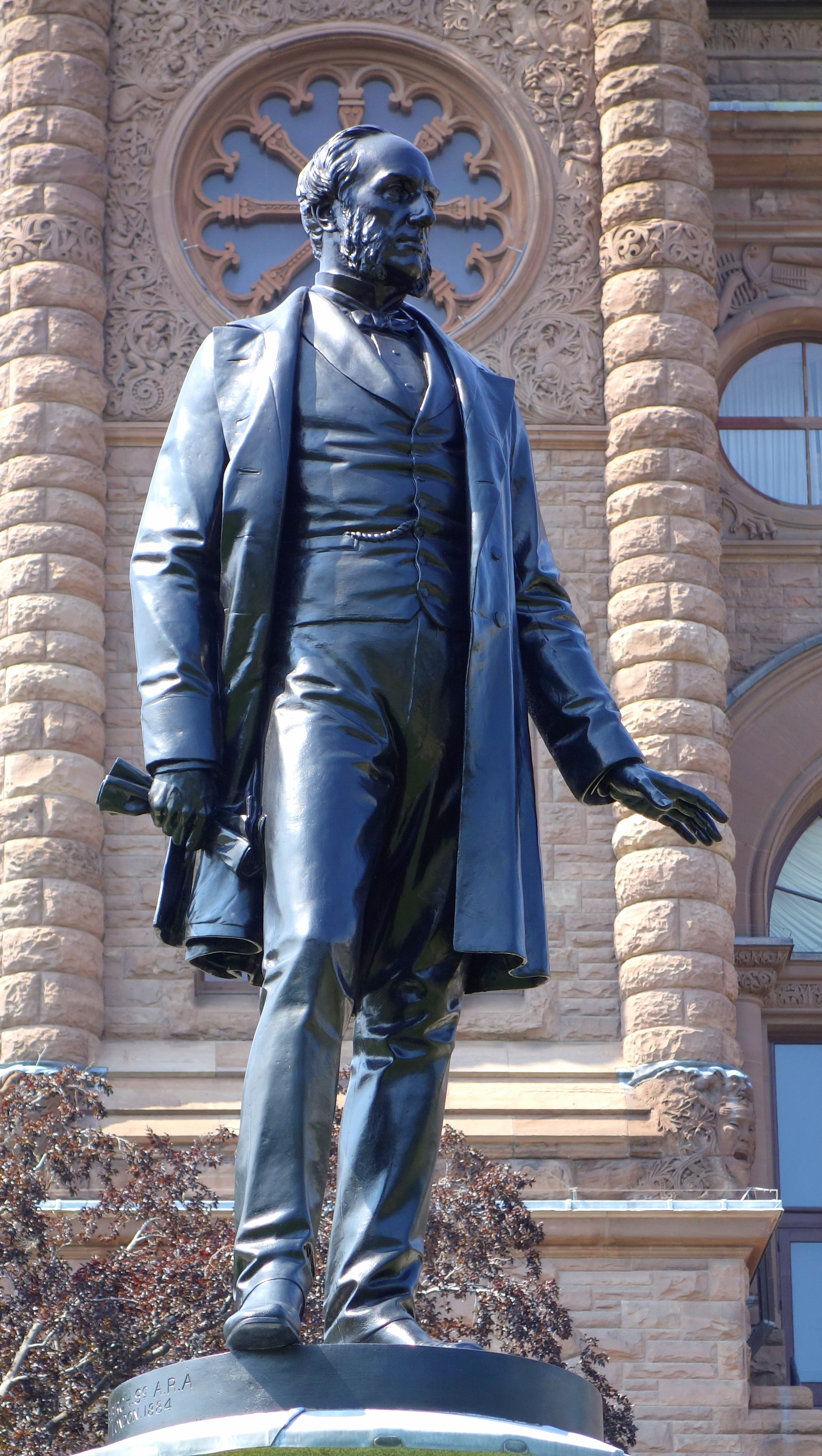
- The statue in 2013
- Subject: George Brown
- Location: Toronto, Ontario, Canada; 43°39′42.1″N 79°23′29.4″W

A statue of George Brown is installed in Toronto's Queen's Park, in Ontario, Canada. The sculpture was unveiled in 1884.
