= Equestrian statue of Edward VII (Toronto) =

Monument in Toronto, Ontario, Canada

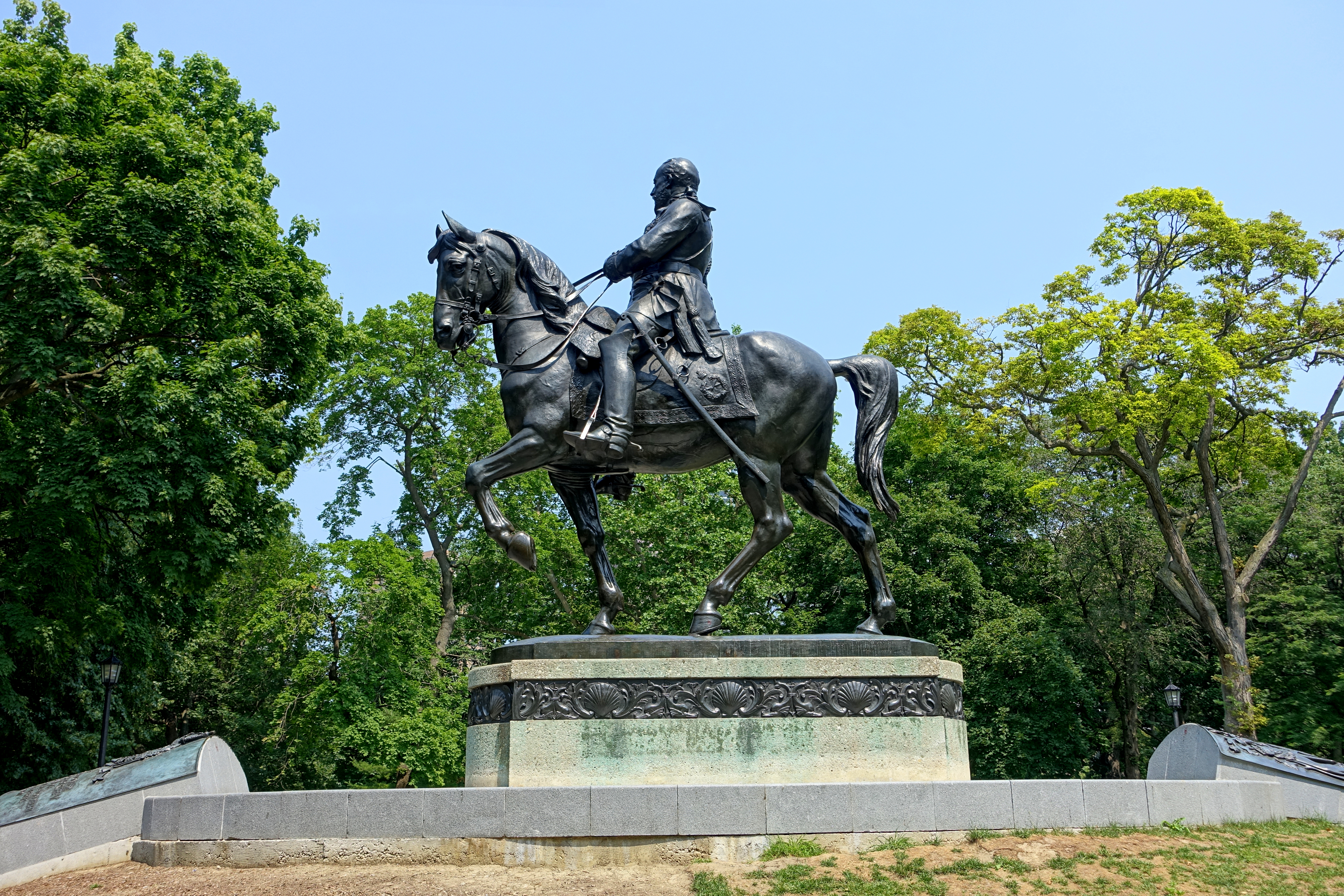
- The monument in 2015
- Location: Toronto, Ontario, Canada; 43°39′52.1″N 79°23′32.8″W

An equestrian statue of Edward VII is installed in Toronto's Queen's Park, in Ontario, Canada.

Originally located in Delhi, India, the sculpture was unveiled by King George V when he visited India for the 1911 Coronation Durbar.

The statue was donated to the city of Toronto in 1969 by Hal Jackman, a Canadian businessman. The statue had been placed in storage after Indian independence. It was disassembled into three pieces, shipped to Toronto, and erected in front of Queen's Park. The statue was accepted by Toronto mayor William Dennison on behalf of the city's Parks and Recreation Committee. The mayor also agreed to Jackman's proposal to place it front and centre of the oval grounds at Queen's Park without public consultation, at a cost to the city of $25,000 (over $200,000 in 2026 dollars).

In 2017, performance artists Life of a Craphead created a replica and submerged it in the Don River as an artistic commentary on colonialism.

== See also ==
- List of equestrian statues
