= Ontario Firefighters Memorial =

Monument in Toronto, Ontario, Canada

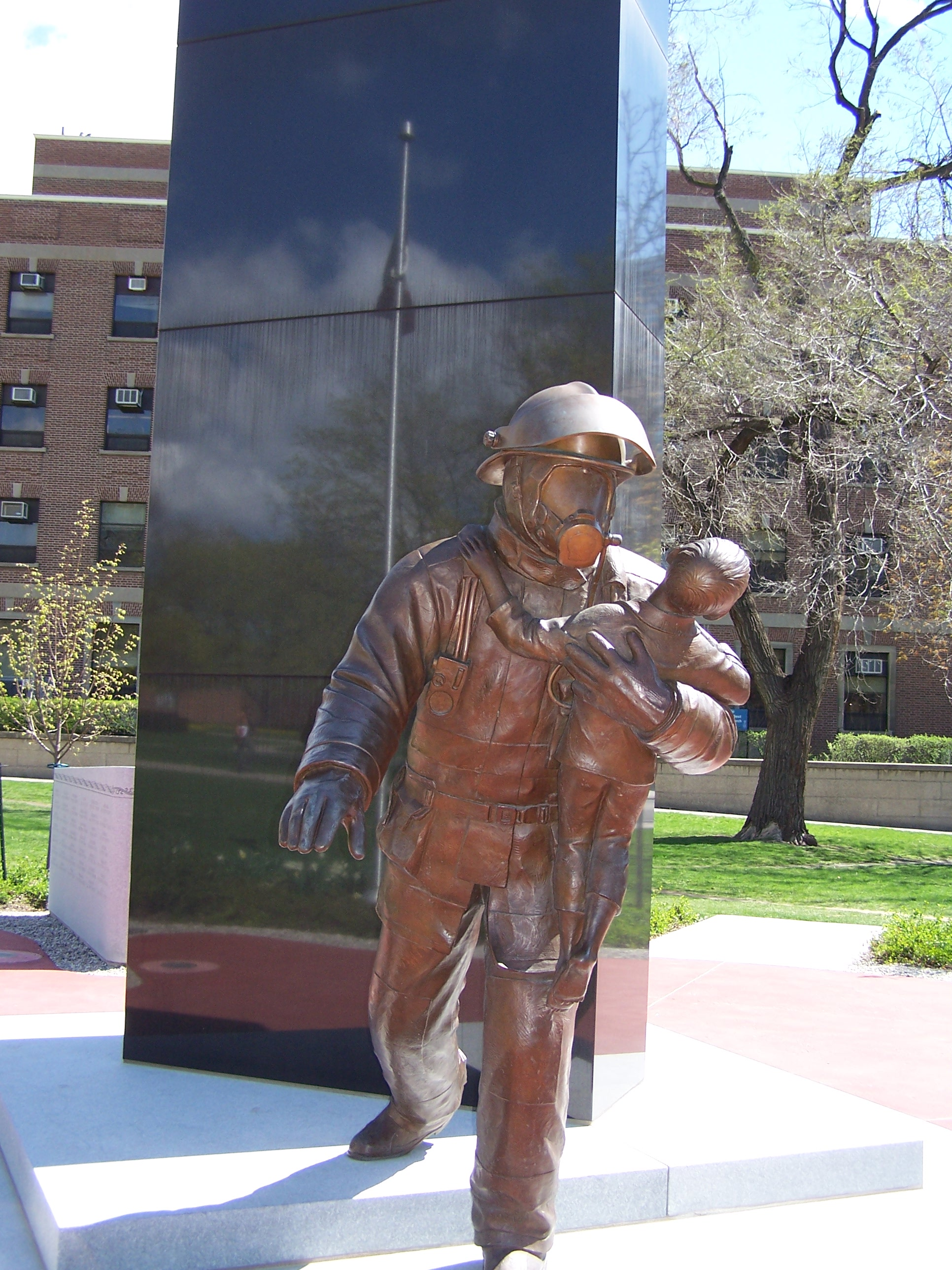
- The memorial in 2006
- Location: Toronto, Ontario, Canada
- 43°39′37.2″N 79°23′23.8″W

The Ontario Firefighters Memorial is a monument in Toronto's Queen's Park, in Ontario, Canada.

== Description and history ==
The memorial was designed by Siggy Puchta and unveiled in 2005. It honours Ontario firefighters who died while serving the public. The memorial depicts a firefighter rescuing a child. It has a red plinth shaped like a Maltese Cross, the international symbol for firefighting, and a list of firefighters who died on duty.

== See also ==
- 2005 in art
- List of firefighting monuments and memorials
