= Statue of Oliver Mowat =

Monument in Toronto, Ontario, Canada

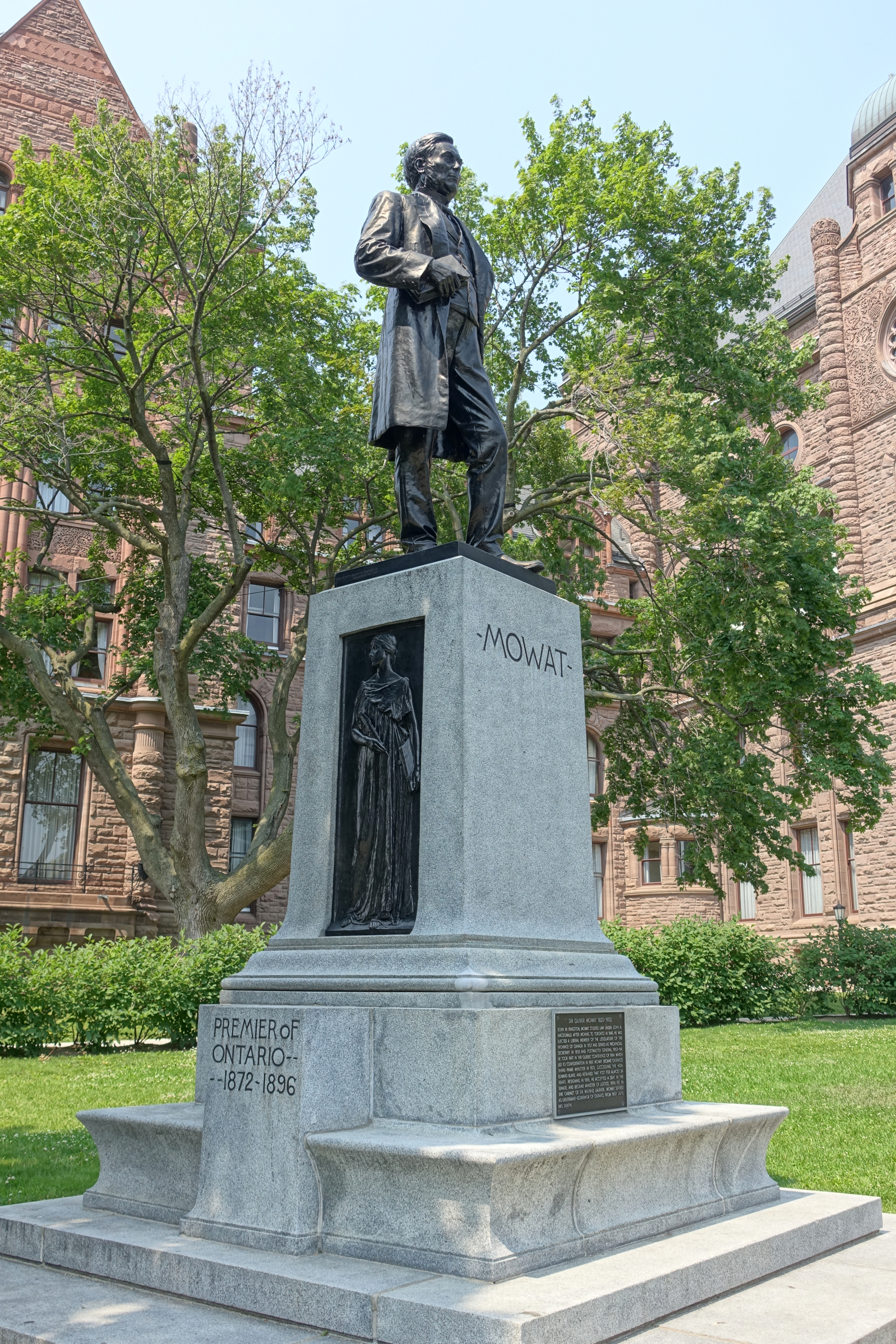
- The monument in 2015
- Location: Toronto, Ontario, Canada; 43°39′42.3″N 79°23′31.4″W

A statue of Oliver Mowat is installed in Toronto's Queen's Park, in Ontario, Canada. The sculpture was designed by Walter Allward and unveiled in 1905.
