= Statue of John Graves Simcoe =

Sculpture in Toronto, Ontario, Canada

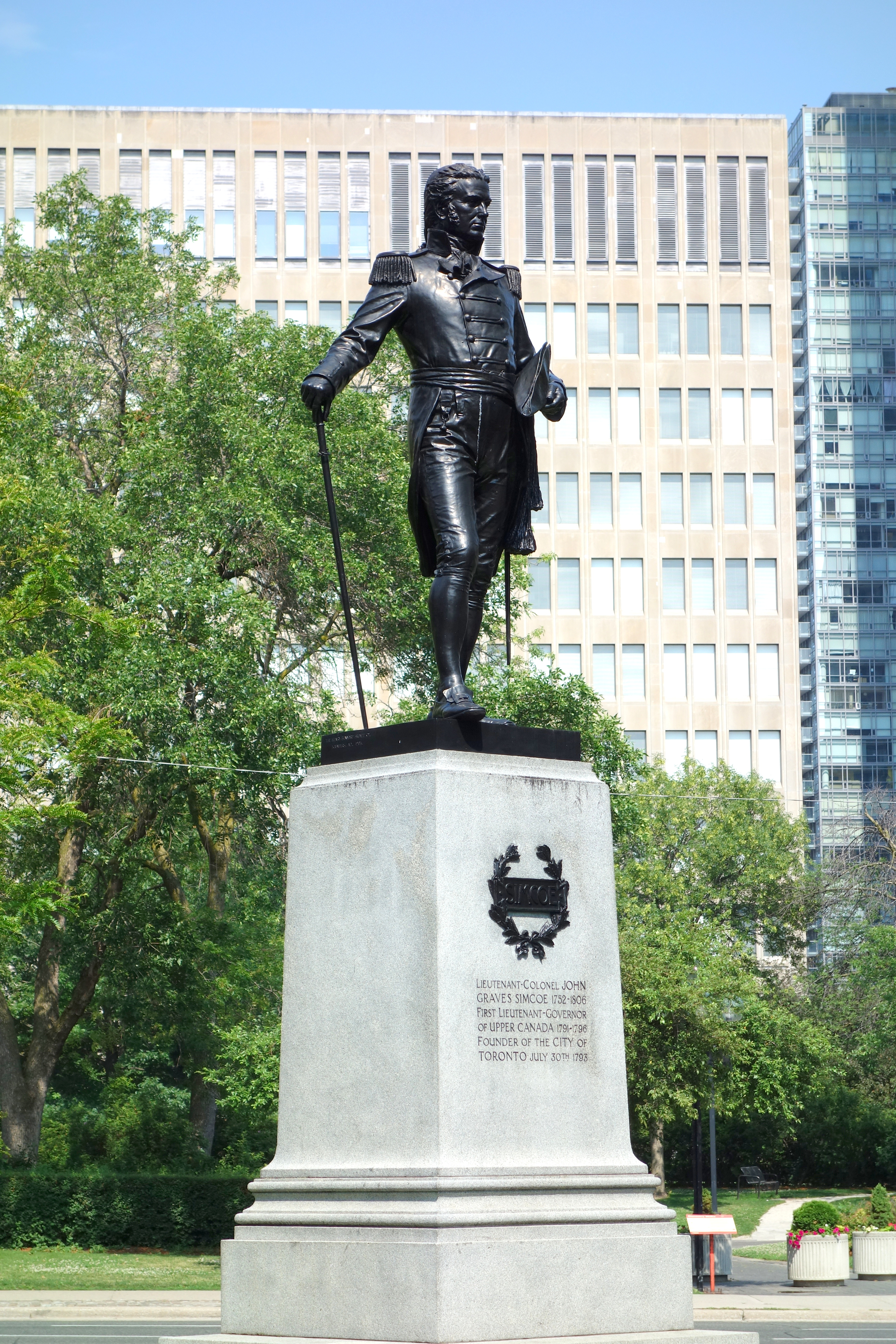
- The monument in 2013
- Subject: John Graves Simcoe
- Location: Toronto, Ontario, Canada; 43°39′43.5″N 79°23′25″W

A statue of John Graves Simcoe is installed in Toronto's Queen's Park, in Ontario, Canada. The sculpture was created by Walter Allward in 1903.
