= Ontario Veterans' Memorial =

Granite wall in Toronto, Ontario, Canada

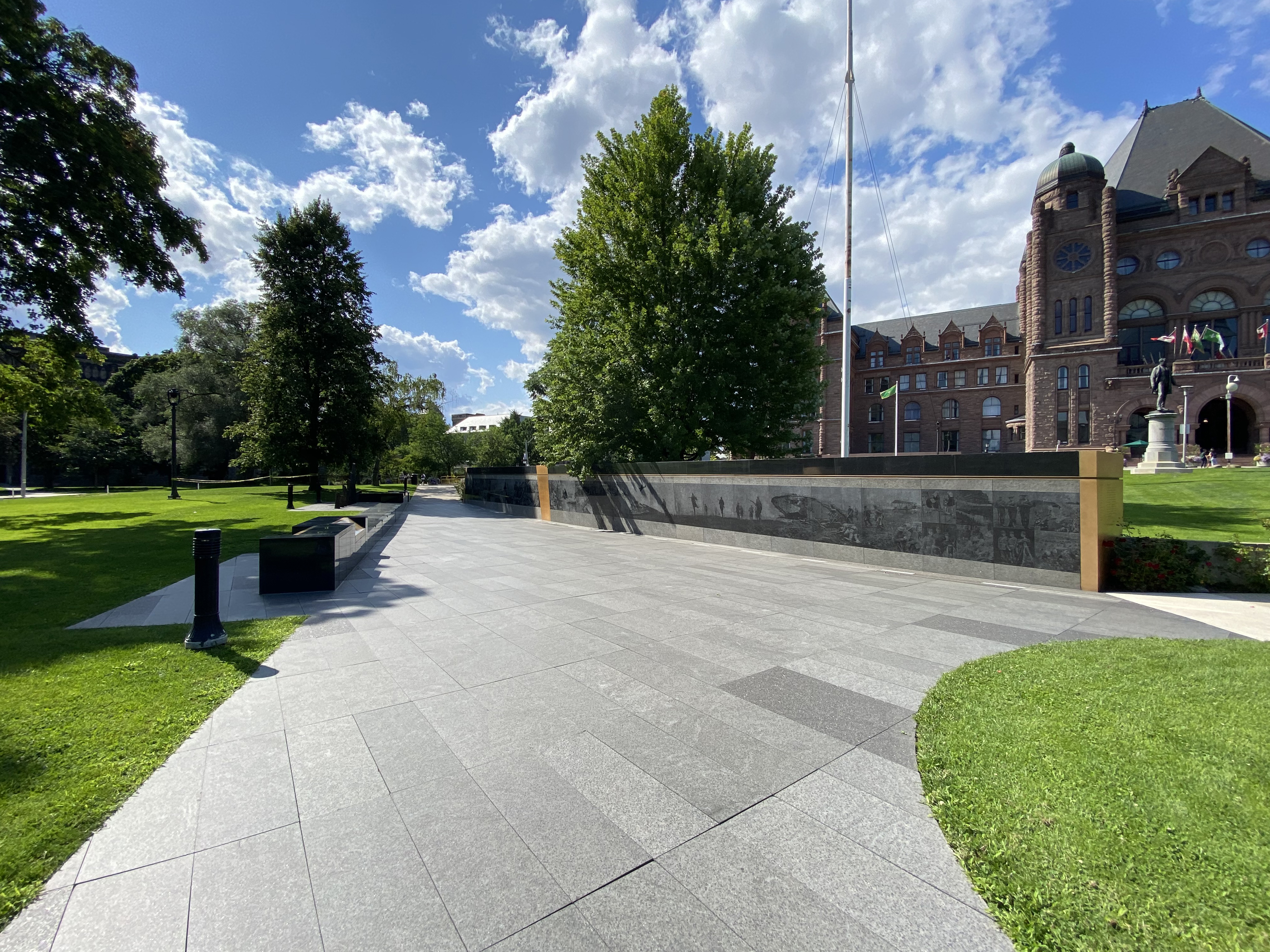
- Ontario Veterans' Memorial
- Interactive map of Ontario Veterans' Memorial
- Location: Queen's Park, Toronto, Ontario, Canada
- Coordinates: 43°39′40.63″N 079°23′28.04″W
- Designer: Allan Harding MacKay
- Type: War memorial
- Length: 30 m (98 ft)
- Opening date: September 16, 2006
- Dedicated to: War veterans of Ontario

Ontario Veterans' War Memorial is a 30-metre-long (98 ft) granite wall located on the front south lawn of Queen's Park in Toronto, Ontario, Canada. The wall was designed by Allan Harding MacKay and landscape architectural firm Phillips Farevaag Smallenberg. Besides images (mostly photographic) laser-etched into the granite, the wall also includes inscriptions from author Jane Urquhart and military historian Jack Granatstein on the bronze centre- and end-pieces respectively. The wall was advocated for by the Veterans’ Memorial Advisory Committee under the leadership of retired Lieutenant-general Richard Rohmer, former Minister of Government Services, Gerry Phillips and public art consultant Karen Mills of Public Art Management.

The wall was completed in 2006 and was officially unveiled on September 16, 2006. It depicts scenes of the Canadian military's role in times of peace and war since 1867 starting with the Fenian raids. The most recent conflict listed is "The Campaign Against Terror".

== See also ==
- Canadian war memorials
