= Statue of James Whitney =

Sculpture in Toronto, Ontario, Canada

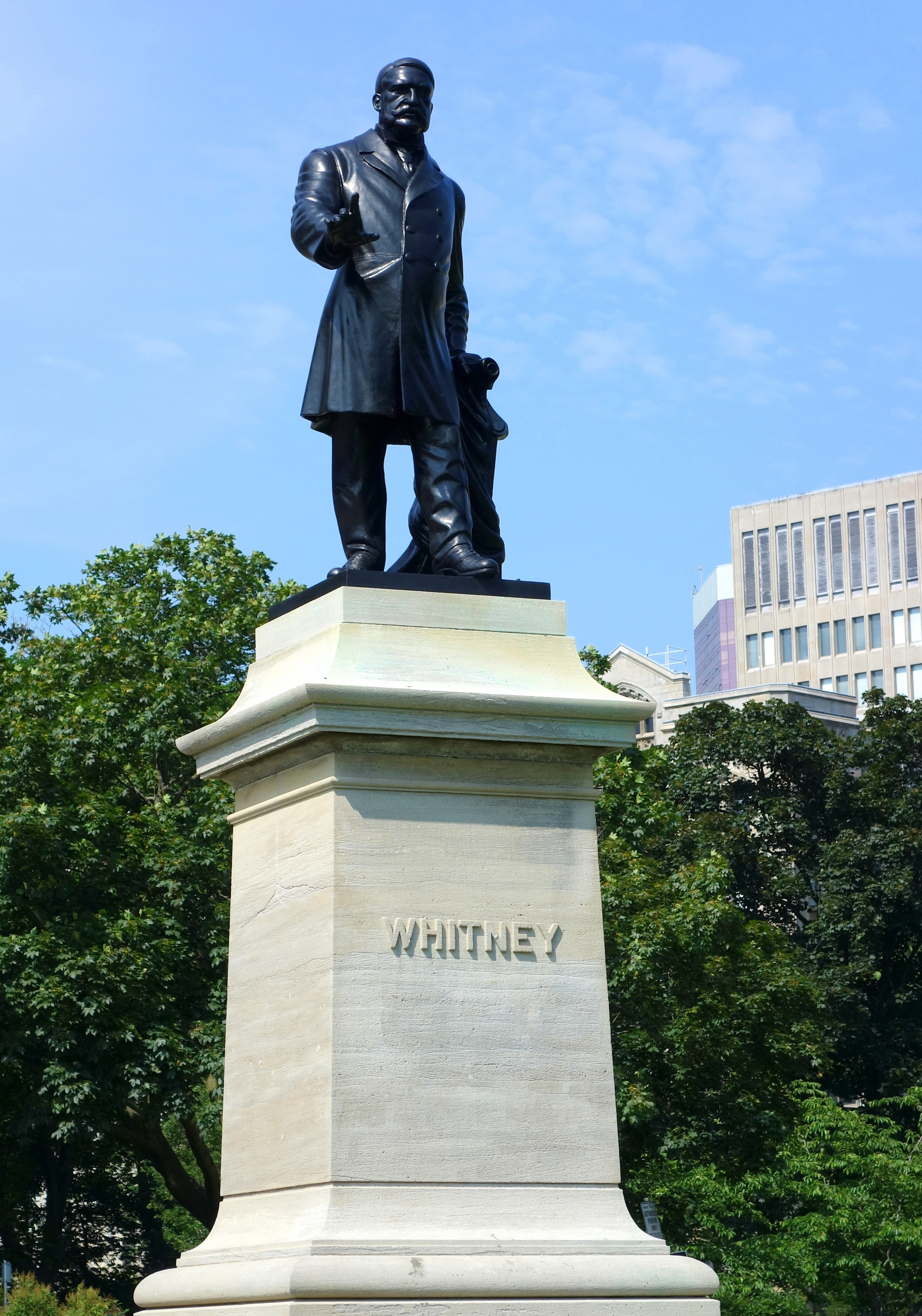
- The statue in 2013
- Subject: James Whitney
- Location: Toronto, Ontario, Canada; 43°39′42.4″N 79°23′28.1″W

A statue of Canadian politician James Whitney is installed in Toronto's Queen's Park, in Ontario, Canada. It was created by Hamilton MacCarthy and unveiled in 1927.
