= Statue of Queen Victoria (Toronto) =

Sculpture in Toronto, Ontario, Canada

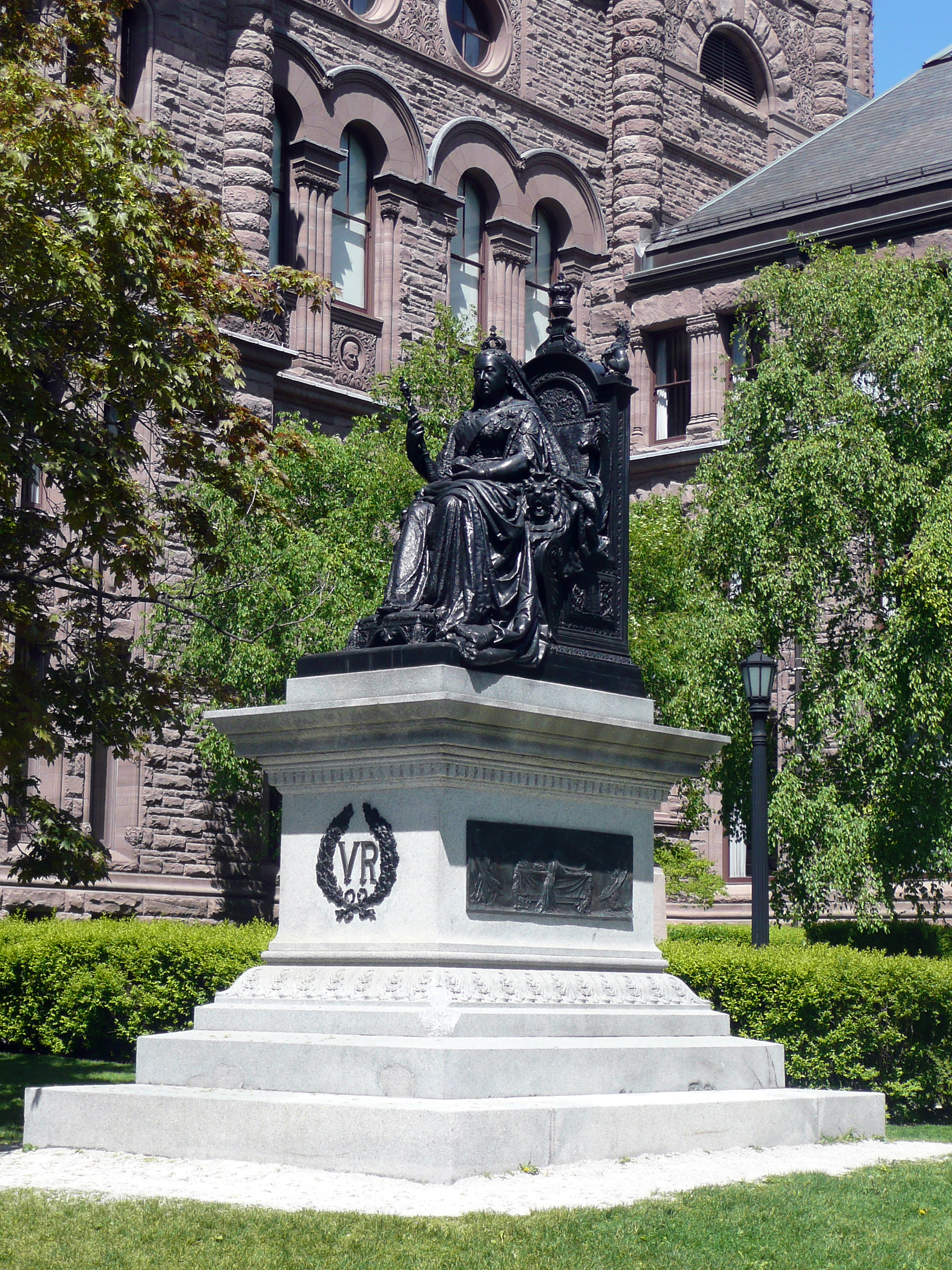
- The statue in 2008
- Location: Toronto, Ontario, Canada; 43°39′43.5″N 79°23′27.1″W

A bronze sculpture of Queen Victoria is installed in Toronto's Queen's Park, in Ontario, Canada.

== See also ==
- List of statues of Queen Victoria
