= Canadian Volunteer Monument =

Memorial in Toronto, Ontario, Canada

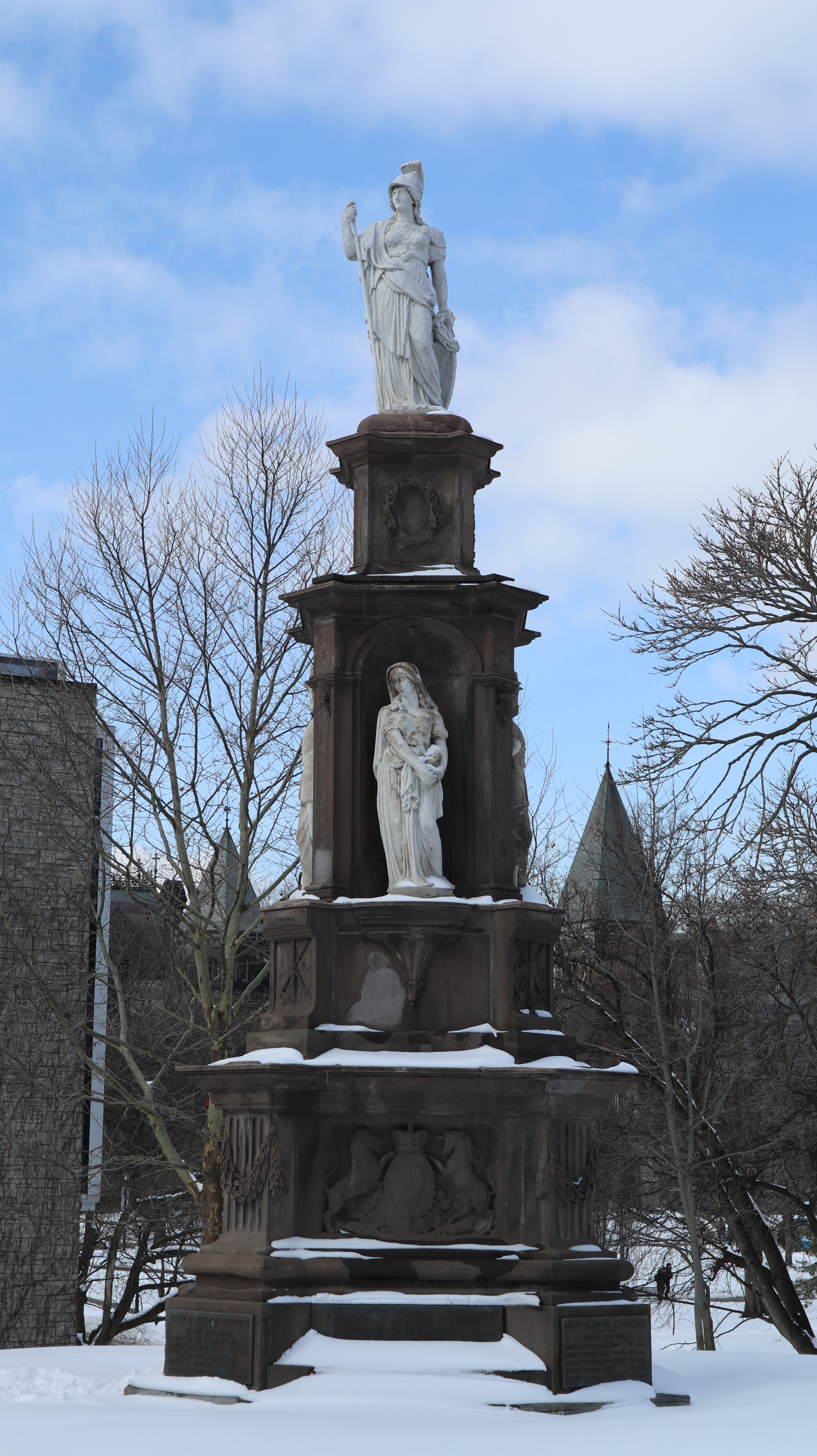
- The memorial in 2019
- Interactive map of Canadian Volunteer Monument
- Location: Toronto, Ontario, Canada
- Coordinates: 43°39′45.6″N 79°23′36″W

The Canadian Volunteer Monument (also known as the Canadian Volunteers Memorial) is installed in Toronto's Queen's Park, in Ontario, Canada. The memorial was dedicated in 1870.

== Description and history ==
The monument was originally situated within Queen's Park when it was unveiled, although the monument was later severed from the park with the construction of Queen's Park Crescent. The monument stands 9 metres (30 ft) tall, and includes a square base made of sandstone blocks with intricate carvings on each side. Atop that is an ornamental shaft with niches that have two life-sized marble figures representing members of the Canadian Militia. On top of the ornamental shaft is a marble statue of Britannia with a plumed helmet, a staff in one hand and laurel leaves in the other. Although the surface of the monument was treated in 2005, much of the detailing on the monument has since faded.
