= Notre Place Monument =

Monument in Toronto, Ontario, Canada

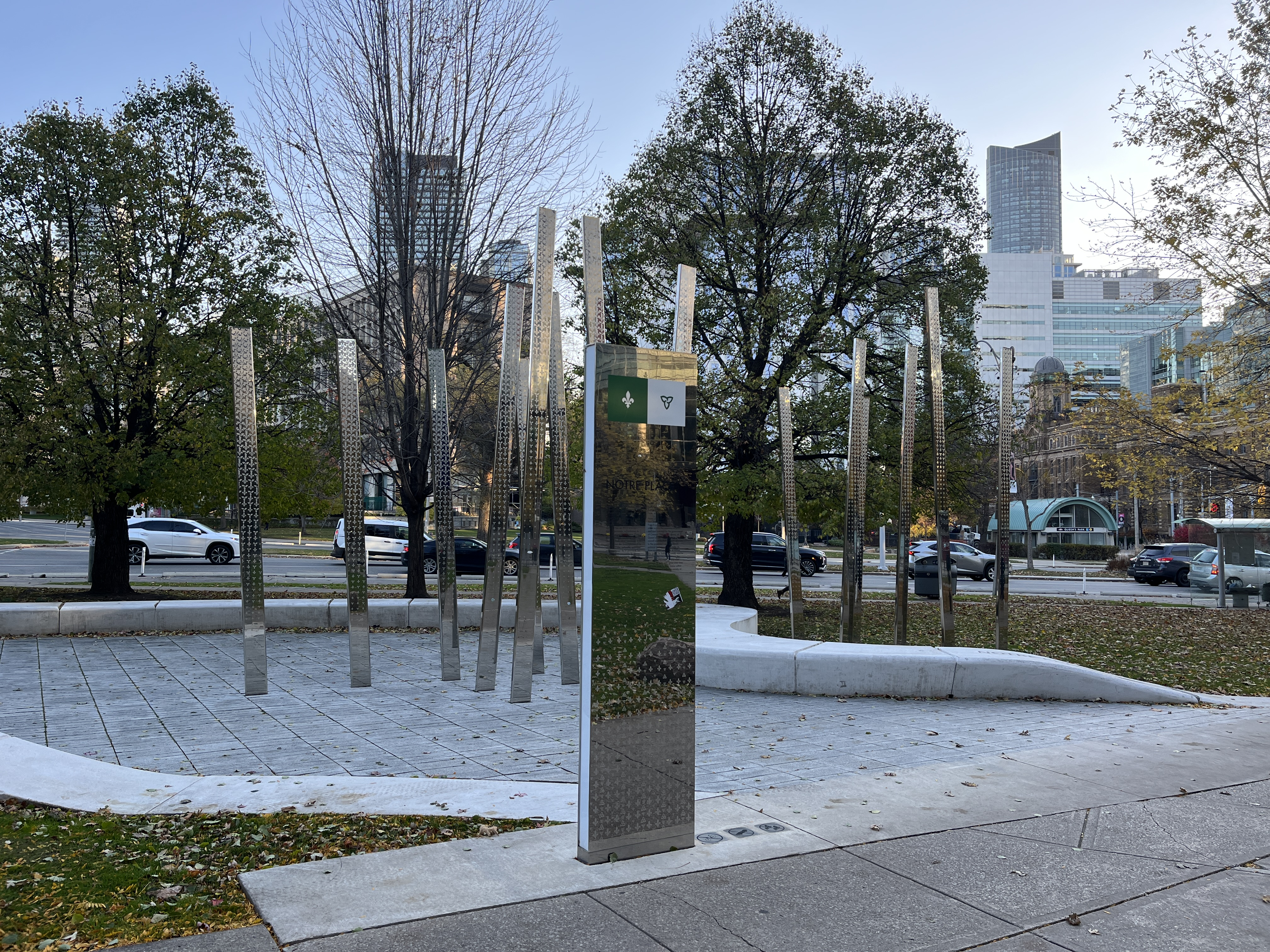
- The sculpture in 2023
- Interactive map of Notre Place Monument
- Location: Toronto, Ontario, Canada
- Coordinates: 43°39′37″N 79°23′28″W

Notre Place Monument, also known as Notre place (English: Our Home), is a monument in Toronto's Queen's Park, in Ontario, Canada. Unveiled in 2018, the monument features a public space and a series of columns.

== Description and history ==
The monument was first proposed in 2015. Work on the monument began on 25 September 2017, on Franco-Ontarian day, and was unveiled on the same day the following year. The stainless steel columns were designed to commemorate Franco-Ontarian contributions in the province's forestry industry, while the surrounding public square was intended to be used as a gathering space. The name of the monument, Notre Place, is a reference to song from Paul Demers and François Dubé. The name of the monument, and the Franco-Ontarian flag is also present on the stoned wall bench that surrounds most of the square. Designed by the architectural firm Brooke McIlroy, the cost to construct the monument was approximate C$900,000.
