= List of public art in Toronto =

The following is a list public artworks, monuments, and memorials that have been installed in Toronto, Ontario, Canada.

== Statues ==
Image	Title / subject	Location and coordinates	Date	Artist / designer	Type	Material	Dimensions	Designation	Owner / administrator	Notes
More images	Adam Beck Memorial	In the landscaped median of University Avenue just south of Queen Street West 43.650464°N 79.386444°W	1934	Emanuel Hahn	Statue	Bronze				
	Statue of Al Purdy									
More images	Bust of Alexander the Great	Alexander the Great Parkette, Greektown	1994		Bust				The City of Toronto	
	Statue of Alexander the Great	Alexander the Great Parkette								
	Statue of Alexander Wood									
More images	Equestrian statue of Edward VII	Queen's Park	1969	Thomas Brock	Sculpture	Bronze				
	Statue of Edward S. Rogers Jr.									
	Statue of Egerton Ryerson									
	Statue of Elizabeth II									
	Statue of George Brown									
	Statue of Glenn Gould									
	Homeless Jesus									
	Statue of Jack Layton									
	Statue of James Whitney									
	Statue of John A. Macdonald									
	Statue of John Graves Simcoe									
	Statue of John Sandfield Macdonald									
	Statue of Johnny Lombardi									
	Statue of Lesya Ukrainka									
	Ned Hanlan Monument									
	Statue of Norman Bethune									
	Statue of Northrop Frye									
	Statue of Oliver Mowat									
	Statue of Queen Victoria									
	Statue of Robert Raikes									
	Statue of Sun Yat-sen	Chinatown								
	Statue of Winston Churchill									

== Memorials and monuments ==
Image	Title / subject	Location and coordinates	Date	Artist / designer	Type	Material	Dimensions	Designation	Owner / administrator	Notes
More images	48th Highlanders of Canada Regimental Memorial	The north end of Queen's Park 43°39′57″N 79°23′34.6″W	1923	Eric Haldenby, Alvan Mathers	War memorial	White granite	2m tall, 8m long			
More images	Afghanistan Memorial	Queen's Park 43°39′40.9″N 79°23′30.6″W	2020	Phillips Farevaag Smallenberg (architectural firm)	War memorial	Bronze, granite				
More images	Bitter Memories of Childhood	Holodomor Memorial Parkette, Exhibition Place	2018	Petro Drozdovsky	Memorial	Bronze	5 feet tall			
More images	Dr. William D. Young Memorial	The eastern border of Kew Gardens, The Beaches 43°40′09″N 79°17′52″W	August 1920	M.D. Klein, Frances Gage, Ivor Lewis	Drinking fountain and memorial	Stone, bronze		Designated under the Ontario Heritage Act		
More images	Frederick G. Gans QC Memorial									
	Freedom for Hungary monument	Budapest Park	1966, totem poles added 2008	Victor Tolgesy (main sculpture)						
	Last Alarm									
	Monument to Multiculturalism									
	Monument to the War of 1812									
	Northwest Rebellion Monument									
	Notre Place Monument									
	Ontario Firefighters Memorial									
	Ontario Police Memorial									
	Ontario Veterans' Memorial									
	Post One Monument									
	Queen Elizabeth Way Monument									
	Shrine Peace Memorial									
	Sons of England War Memorial									
	South African War Memorial									
	William Lyon Mackenzie Monument									

== Sculptures ==
Image	Title / subject	Location and coordinates	Date	Artist / designer	Type	Material	Dimensions	Designation	Owner / administrator	Notes
	3 inuksuit	Toronto Pearson Airport, Terminal 1		Kiakshuk						
More images	The Arrival: Apprehensive Man (depicted), Jubilant Man, Orphan Boy, Pregnant Woman, and Woman on Ground	Ireland Park	2007	Rowan Gillespie	Sculptures	Bronze				
More images	The Audience	1 Blue Jays Way, Rogers Centre, Toronto	1989	Michael Snow	Sculpture	Steel, heavy foam, fibreglass, gold paint	Each figure ~6.1m in height			
More images	Businessman on a Horse	St. Michael's College	1989	William McElcheran	Sculpture	Bronze				
	Community		2001	Kirk Newman	Sculpture	Bronze			Manulife	
More images	Complexes of a Young Lady	Hart House, University of Toronto	1962	Sorel Etrog	Sculpture	Bronze	270 x 75 x 52 cm		Hart House Collection, University of Toronto	
More images	Consolation	St. Michael's College, University of Toronto	1996	Joe Rosenthal	Sculpture	Bronze			University of St. Michael's College	
More images	Couch Monster	Art Gallery of Ontario	June 20, 2022	Brian Jungen	Sculpture	Bronze	4m tall and 5.5m long		Art Gallery of Ontario	
More images	Courante	Toronto Music Garden		Various	Sculpture				City of Toronto	
More images	Dreaming	Richmond-Adelaide Centre, 120 Adelaide St. W.	Fall 2020	Jaume Plensa	Sculpture	White marble and resin	Three stories tall, weighing more than 2.5 tonnes		Oxford Properties	
More images	Dreamwork of the Whales	Little Norway Park, 659 Queens Quay W., west of Bathurst Street	1981	Designer: Georganna Malloff; Designer/Sculptors: Ben Barclay, Daniel Gauvin, Earl Thomlinson, Julian Bowron and Lynn Daly	Sculpture	Western Red Cedar	12 metres tall, 5' diameter.		Disputed between the City of Toronto and the artists.	
More images	The Elevated Wetlands	Near Don Mills Road and the DVP	1998	Noel Harding	Sculptures					
More images	Endless Bench	Sick Kids Hospital	1984	Lea Vivot	Sculpture	Bronze			Sick Kids Hospital	"Represents the bond between mothers and their children... Engraved with 476 messages of love, hope and inspiration."
More images	Equal Before the Law	McMurtry Law Gardens, Osgoode Hall (Ontario Court of Appeal)	2011	Eldon Garnet	Sculpture	Bronze	Scale: height: 10 ft, width 4 ft Platform: length: 20 ft, width 4 ft, thickness 6 ft			
More images	Flight Stop	Toronto Eaton Centre	1979	Michael Snow	Sculpture	Styrofoam, fibreglass	32 x 20 x 16 m			
	Freedom of Expression									
	Global Convenience	Harbour Square Park Basin	2026	TF Dean Studio Inc. (Trevor Wheatley and Cosmo Dean)						
	Helix of Life			Ted Bieler						
	Hours of the Day									
	Immigrant Family			Tom Otterness						
	IT			Michael Christian						
	Koilos			Michael Christian						
	Large Two Forms			Henry Moore						
	Let the Oppressed Go Free									
	Little Glenn									
	Megaptera									
	Michael			Anne Allardyce						
	Neighbours			Joe Rosenthal						
	Nurture Nature			Joe Fafard						
	Our Game			Edie Parker						
	PanAm People’s Cauldron	PanAm games opening and closing ceremony	2015	Craig White, Yshmael Cabana, Christiano De Araujo						
	The Pasture									
	People Walking	333 Bloor Street East, Rogers Head Office.	2007	Julian Opie						
	Pillars of Justice			Edwina Sandys						
	Rising			Zhang Huan						
	Sentinelles			Jean-Pierre Morin						
	Spirit of Discovery									
	Still Dancing			Dennis Oppenheim						
	Survivors Are Not Heroes	Hart House (University of Toronto)	1967	Sorel Etrog						
	Symbolic Peace	Distillery District								
	Tembo, Mother of Elephants									
	Three Way Piece No.2: Archer			Henry Moore						
	U.V. Ceti			Andrew Posa						
	When I Was Naked									
	When I Was Sick	Church of the Redeemer								
	Woodpecker Column									

== Other ==
Image	Title / subject	Location and coordinates	Date	Artist / designer	Type	Material	Dimensions	Designation	Owner / administrator	Notes
	Lower Simcoe Street underpass murals									
	Princes' Gates									
	Princess Margaret Fountain									
	Rhythm of Exotic Plants									
	Untitled relief (1973)	John M. Kelly Library		William McElcheran						

== See also ==
- Garden of the Greek Gods
- Graffiti in Toronto
- Graffiti Alley, Toronto
- Toronto subway public art
- Canadian war memorials
- Royal monuments in Canada
