= Toronto subway public art =

This article catalogues public art on the Toronto subway. It lists public art installed at Toronto subway stations by subway line and station. More information may be found in the individual station articles.

| Station | Line | Title | Artist | Description | Photo |
|---|---|---|---|---|---|
| Cedarvale | Line 1 Yonge–University Line 5 Eglinton | Summertime Streetcar | Gerald Zeldin | Enamel murals on opposite sides of the tracks depicting PCC streetcars | |
| Cedarvale | Line 1 Yonge–University Line 5 Eglinton | Super Signals | Douglas Coupland | Aluminum panels with brightly coloured concentric circles against a background of black and white diagonal lines | |
| College | Line 1 Yonge–University | Hockey Knights in Canada | Charles Pachter | Murals on opposite sides of the tracks depicting the Montreal Canadiens and the Toronto Maple Leafs, with the Canadiens on the northbound side and the Leafs on the southbound side | |
| Downsview Park | Line 1 Yonge–University | Spin | Panya Clark Espinal | Anamorphic circular figures silkscreened onto the walls, floors, and ceilings | |
| Dupont | Line 1 Yonge–University | The Force that through the green fuse drives the flower | James Sutherland | Mural that depicts the role of plant life in shaping Earth's ecosystems; named after Dylan Thomas's poem of the same name | |
| Dupont | Line 1 Yonge–University | Miscellaneous Hardware | Ron Baird | Decorative gate to an electrical substation, inspired by caps on railway tank cars | |
| Dupont | Line 1 Yonge–University | Spadina Summer Under All Seasons | James Sutherland | Mosaics of flowers using thousands of pieces of glass built directly into the station's tiling | |
| Eglinton | Line 1 Yonge–University Line 5 Eglinton | Light from Within | Rodney LaTourelle and Louise Witthöft | Panel made of mirrored glass tiles, inspired by minerals, crystals, and gemstones | |
| Finch | Line 1 Yonge–University | Crossroads | Kseniya Tsoy | Mural painted outside the east side entrance between Finch and Bishop Avenues | |
| Finch | Line 1 Yonge–University | Rhythm of Exotic Plants | Krystyna Sadowska | Abstract stainless steel sculpture | |
| Finch West | Line 1 Yonge–University Line 6 Finch West | | Bruce McLean | Supporting columns made of sculptured concrete | |
| Glencairn | Line 1 Yonge–University | Joy | Rita Letendre | Station-length skylight consisting of panes of art colours inserted between two glass panels | |
| Highway 407 | Line 1 Yonge–University | Sky Ellipse | David Pearl | Multi-coloured glass panels for the subway platform skylights and bus terminal façade | |
| Lawrence West | Line 1 Yonge–University | Spacing... Aerial Highways | Claude Breeze | Enamel tile mosaic depicting abstract wavy lines | |
| Museum | Line 1 Yonge–University | | | Decorative columns resembling the Egyptian god Osiris, First Nations house posts, Doric columns found in the Parthenon, China's Forbidden City columns, and Toltec warriors | |
| North York Centre | Line 1 Yonge–University | North York Heritage Murals | Nicholas and Susana Graven | Murals made of over 10,000 pieces of glazed ceramic tile on the northbound and southbound platforms | |
| Pioneer Village | Line 1 Yonge–University | LightSpell | Tim Edler and Jan Edler | 40 ceiling-suspended chandeliers to display 8 interactively-entered characters; installed but not yet activated due to the TTC's concerns about offensive language | |
| Queen | Line 1 Yonge–University | Our Nell | John Boyle | Painted murals at the platform level depicting Nellie McClung (a women's rights activist), William Lyon Mackenzie (first mayor of Toronto), and the former Simpson's and Eaton's department stores | |
| Queen's Park | Line 1 Yonge–University | | Ana Vilela | A ceramic tile mural, displayed in the mezzanine, donated by the Government of Portugal and inspired by Portuguese exploration of the New World | |
| Sheppard West | Line 1 Yonge–University | Boney Bus | John McKinnon | Abstract bus shape made from aluminum beams and basalt "wheels" | |
| Sheppard West | Line 1 Yonge–University | Dodecadandy | Jennifer Marman and Daniel Borins | Sculpture adjacent to the station's emergency exit that represents a dandelion shedding its seeds | |
| Sheppard West | Line 1 Yonge–University | Sliding Pi | Arlene Stamp | Large-scale mosaic along the curved wall of the stairway between the bus platform and the mezzanine | |
| Sheppard–Yonge | Line 1 Yonge–University Line 4 Sheppard | Flocking Together | Erika James and Jieun Kim | Aerosol and acrylic mural on the wall of the Harlandale entrance | |
| Sheppard–Yonge | Line 1 Yonge–University Line 4 Sheppard | Immersion Land | Stacey Spiegel | Mosaic composed of 1.5 million one-inch tiles developed from a digitized and pixelated blend of 150 photographs depicting lush landscapes, country homes, and rural scenes stretching along Yonge Street | |
| Spadina | Line 1 Yonge–University Line 2 Bloor–Danforth | Barren Ground Caribou | Joyce Wieland | Large quilt featuring caribou in a tundra landscape, located at the concourse level below the 85 Spadina Road entrance | |
| Spadina | Line 1 Yonge–University Line 2 Bloor–Danforth | K'san Village House Posts | Fedelia O'Brien, Murphy Green, and Chuck Heit | Large cedar wood carvings depicting an owl, a wolf and a hawk displayed on the ground level of the 6 Spadina Road entrance | |
| Spadina | Line 1 Yonge–University Line 2 Bloor–Danforth | Morning Glory | Louis de Niverville | Surreal enamel mural at the 85 Spadina Road entrance | |
| St. Clair West | Line 1 Yonge–University | The Commuters | Rhonda Weppler and Trevor Mahovsky | Several bronze snails clinging to the walls of a staircase leading down from the streetcar/bus platform; inspired by a children's book by Pierre Berton. The shells of the snails consist of various items lost by commuters. | |
| St. Clair West | Line 1 Yonge–University | The Spirits of the Ancestral Trees | Paula Gonzalez-Ossa | Mural adorning the station's emergency exit | |
| St. Clair West | Line 1 Yonge–University | Tempo | Gordon Rayner | Enamel mural depicting abstract stripes | |
| TMU | Line 1 Yonge–University | City in Motion | Asli Alin | Mural depicting people, architecture, and public transit in downtown Toronto | |
| TMU | Line 1 Yonge–University | Cross Section | William McElcheran | Terracotta tile murals depicting a vibrant urban scene of pets, shoppers, businessmen and other commuters | |
| Union | Line 1 Yonge–University | Zones of Immersion | Stuart Reid | 166 large glass panels along the length of the platform depicting sketches of commuters | |
| Vaughan | Line 1 Yonge–University | Atmospheric Lens | Paul Raff Studio | Coloured mirrored panels and windows located on the domed ceiling | |
| Wellesley | Line 1 Yonge–University | March of the Dragon | Jieun Kim | Mural depicting diverse figures riding a dragon | |
| Wilson | Line 1 Yonge–University | Canyons | Ted Bieler | Wall sculpture located at the mezzanine level | |
| Wilson | Line 1 Yonge–University | Daily Migration | Shalak Attack, Edan Maxam, and Kseniya Tsoy | Three murals located on the walls of the Tippett Road entrance and the corridor underneath Allen Road | |
| Wilson | Line 1 Yonge–University | The Guardians | Shalak Attack | Murals of four female gatekeepers that adorn the supportive columns beneath the station | |
| Wilson | Line 1 Yonge–University | Outside the Lines | Christine Leu and Alan Webb | Seven painted steel sculptures, inspired by air shows hosted at Downsview Airport | |
| York Mills | Line 1 Yonge–University | Breaking Ground | Laurie Swim | Tapestry commemorating the 50th anniversary of the Hoggs Hollow Disaster | |
| York University | Line 1 Yonge–University | Piston Effect | Jason Bruges Studio | Glass panels that provide a black and white lighting display when a train passes | |
| Bay | Line 2 Bloor–Danforth | Confluence | Francisco-Fernando Granados | Mosaic inspired by the artist's experience as a refugee from Guatemala | |
| Castle Frank | Line 2 Bloor–Danforth | Earth Runs Wild | Vivian Rosas | Three-dimensional aluminium wall pieces depicting Pachamama flanked by earth and water motifs | |
| Chester | Line 2 Bloor–Danforth | Florae | Katharine Harvey | Ceramic tile mosaics that depict plants and flowers indigenous to the nearby neighbourhoods and ravines | |
| Coxwell | Line 2 Bloor–Danforth | Forwards and Backwards | Jennifer Davis and Jon Sasaki | Three-dimensional sculpted curtain, cast in polished reflective aluminum | |
| Coxwell | Line 2 Bloor–Danforth | Pods Through Time | Cristina Delago | Mural on the wall of the bus loop, divided into two sections representing the past and the future | |
| Donlands | Line 2 Bloor–Danforth | Field | April Hickox | Photographic collage of wildflowers, plants, and trees native to the Toronto Islands | |
| Dufferin | Line 2 Bloor–Danforth | Something Happens Here | Eduardo Aquino and Karen Shanski | Colourful mosaics with metallic tiles featuring local logos, icons and historical references | |
| Kennedy | Line 2 Bloor–Danforth Line 5 Eglinton | Locations of Meaning | Joseph Kosuth | Tile wall with stainless steel inserts that spell out the word "meaning" in seventy-two different languages | |
| Kennedy | Line 2 Bloor–Danforth Line 5 Eglinton | Reorganization of One Hedge | Dagmara Genda | Photographs of hedge leaves printed on glass and light boxes | |
| Kennedy | Line 2 Bloor–Danforth Line 5 Eglinton | A Sense of Place | Frank Perna | Mural painted on the service road entrance; half of the mural was destroyed when the entrance was demolished in 2018 | |
| Ossington | Line 2 Bloor–Danforth | Ossington Particles | Scott Eunson | 800 stick-on coloured acrylic tiles arranged in clusters; evocative of Garrison Creek | |
| Pape | Line 2 Bloor–Danforth | Source/ Derivations | Allan Harding MacKay | Wall panels depicting features of the station and of the neighbourhood | |
| Runnymede | Line 2 Bloor–Danforth | Anonymous Somebody | Elicser Elliott | Depictions of people in Bloor West Village | |
| Sherbourne | Line 2 Bloor–Danforth | The Whole is Greater than the Sum of its Parts | Rebecca Bayer | Wall panels consisting of colourful mosaic ceramic tiles | |
| Victoria Park | Line 2 Bloor–Danforth | Roots | Aniko Meszaros | Laser-cut stainless steel screens with organic, root-like designs, casting shadows through a perforated canopy | |
| Woodbine | Line 2 Bloor–Danforth | Directions Intersections Connections | Jennifer Marman and Daniel Borins | Brightly coloured coated metal panels arranged in geometric patterns | |
| Bayview | Line 4 Sheppard | From Here Right Now | Panya Clark Espinal | Shadows of common objects such as apples and ladders silk screened to the linoleum and walls framed by patches of coloured tile giving it a surreal look called trompe-l'œil | |
| Bessarion | Line 4 Sheppard | Passing | Sylvie Bélanger | Friezes representing the station's users, depicting heads at the platform, legs at the concourse, and hands along the stairways leading to the station entrances | |
| Don Mills | Line 4 Sheppard | before/after | Stephen Cruise | Tilework and bronze inlays that represent the local geology, flora, and fauna | |
| Don Mills | Line 4 Sheppard | Northern Dancer | Stephen Cruise | Sculpture on the wall of an electrical substation that pays homage to the eponymous racehorse | |
| Leslie | Line 4 Sheppard | Ampersand | Micah Lexier | 17,000 ceramic tiles, each inscribed with the hand-written words "Sheppard" and "Leslie" divided by a printed ampersand | |
| Caledonia | Line 5 Eglinton | Ride of Your Life | Janice Kerbel | Mosaics with text compositions in varying typefaces and sizes | |
| Don Valley | Line 5 Eglinton | Total Lunar Eclipse | Sarah Morris | Wall painting composed of hand-silkscreened porcelain tiles | |
| Forest Hill | Line 5 Eglinton | A Bird in the Hand | Vanessa Maltese | Large-scale screenprinting of birds and hands on a window | |
| Mount Dennis | Line 5 Eglinton | Up to This Moment | Hadley + Maxwell | Video display that showcases changes to the Kodak Heights site | |
| Mount Dennis | Line 5 Eglinton | | Sara Cwynar | Wall mural consisting of a collage of photographic images digitally printed on layered glass panels | |
| Oakwood | Line 5 Eglinton | Assembly of Colour, Rhythm, and Form | Nicholas Pye | Large-scale photograph of pick-up sticks | |
| Oakwood | Line 5 Eglinton | | Adrian Hayes | Mural that represents the cultural vibrancy of the Little Jamaica neighbourhood | |

== See also ==
- List of public art in Toronto
- Toronto Subway (typeface)
