= Machowski =

Machowski (feminine: Machowska; plural: Machowscy) is a Polish surname. It may be transliterated as: Machowsky, Machovsky, Makhovsky, Machovsky, Mahovsky. Notable people with the surname include:

- Ignacy Machowski (1920–2001), Polish actor
- Marian Machowski (1932–2022), Polish footballer and researcher
- Matěj Machovský (born 1993), Czech ice hockey goaltender
- Ray Machowski, police inspector from Grand Theft Auto III video game
- Sebastian Machowski (died 1672), Polish nobleman and a military leader
- Tiago Machowski (born 1993), Brazilian footballer
- Tom Machowski (born 1953), American ice hockey player
- Trevor Mahovsky (born 1969), Canadian collaborative artist duo with Rhonda Weppler (born 1972)

== See also ==
- Mackowski
