= Dundas station (disambiguation) =

Dundas station, now known as TMU station, is a subway station in Toronto, Ontario, Canada.

Dundas station may also refer to:

- Dundas light rail station, in Sydney, New South Wales, Australia
- Dundas station (Grand Trunk Railway), a demolished station in Dundas, Ontario, Canada

== See also ==
- Dundas West station, a subway station in Toronto, Ontario, Canada
