= The Last Alarm =

The Last Alarm may refer to:

- The Last Alarm (1926 film), American silent drama film
- The Last Alarm (1940 film), American crime film
- The Last Alarm (sculpture), public art work by Robert Daus
- Last Alarm (sculpture), a memorial sculpture in Ontario, Canada
