= Spirit of Discovery =

Spirit of Discovery may refer to

- Spirit of Discovery (2001), a cruise ship of Cruise West
- Spirit of Discovery (2019), a cruise ship launched in 2019 for Saga Cruises
- Spirit of Discovery (sculpture), a 2005 sculpture by Veronica and Edwin Dam de Nogales
