= Monument to Multiculturalism =

Sculpture in Toronto, Ontario, Canada

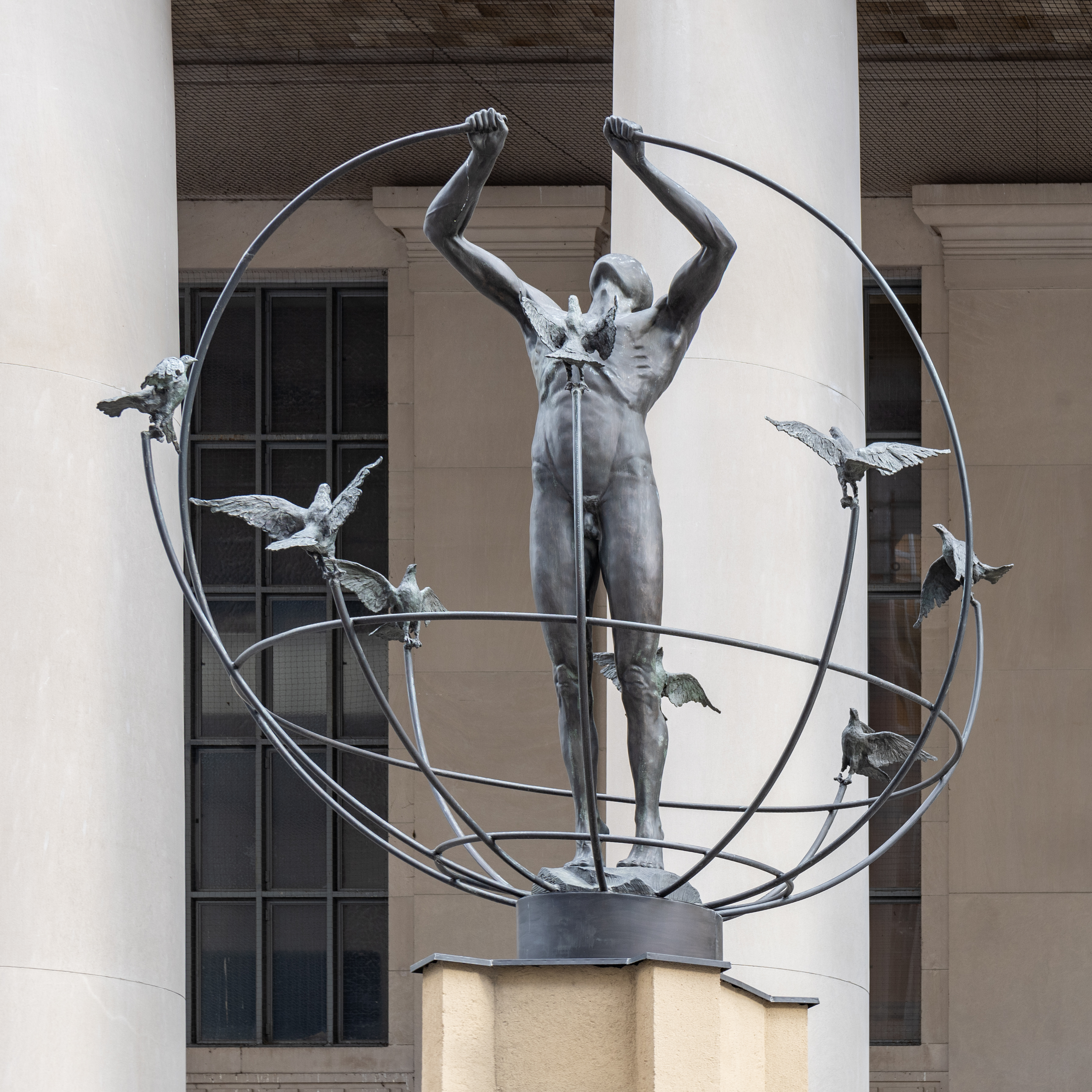
- The sculpture in 2025
- Location: Toronto, Ontario, Canada
- 43°38′44″N 79°22′51″W

Monument to Multiculturalism (also known as Symbol of Multiculturalism) is a 1985 sculpture by Francesco Pirelli, installed outside Toronto's Union Station, in Ontario, Canada.

== See also ==
- Canadian Multiculturalism Act
- Cultural mosaic
- Just society
- List of public art in Toronto
- Multiculturalism in Canada
  - Multicultural media in Canada
