= Mackowski =

Mackowski or Maćkowski (feminine: Maćkowska; plural: Maćkowscy) is a Polish surname. Notable people with the surname include:

- Joanie Mackowski (born 1963), American poet
- William D. Mackowski (1916–2002), American politician
