= Statue of Jack Layton =

Sculpture in Toronto, Ontario, Canada

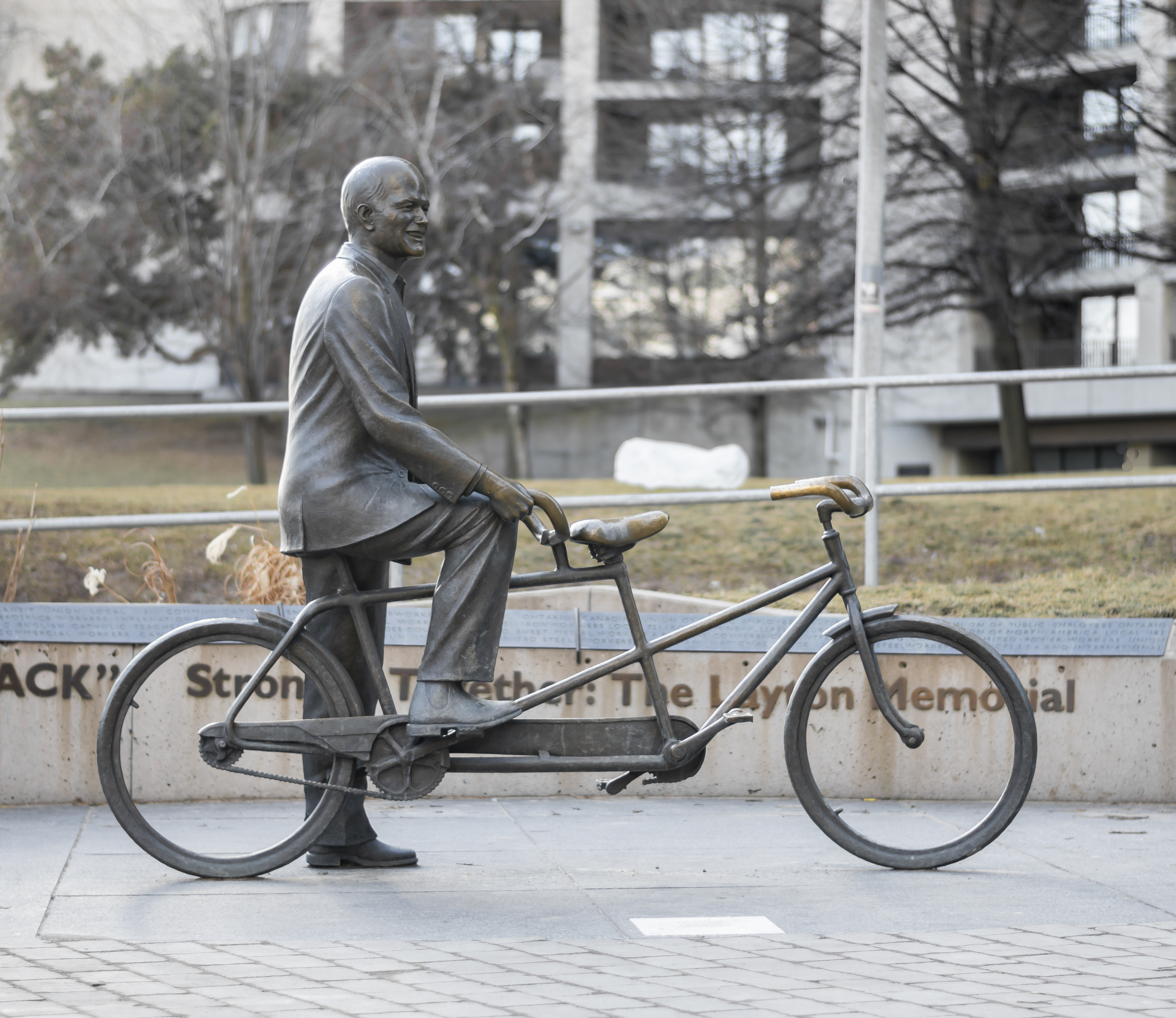
- The statue in 2023
- Location: Toronto, Ontario, Canada; 43°38′25.7″N 79°22′34.5″W

A bronze sculpture of Canadian politician Jack Layton is installed in Toronto, Ontario. The statue was unveiled in 2013.
