= Afghanistan Memorial =

Monument in Toronto, Ontario, Canada

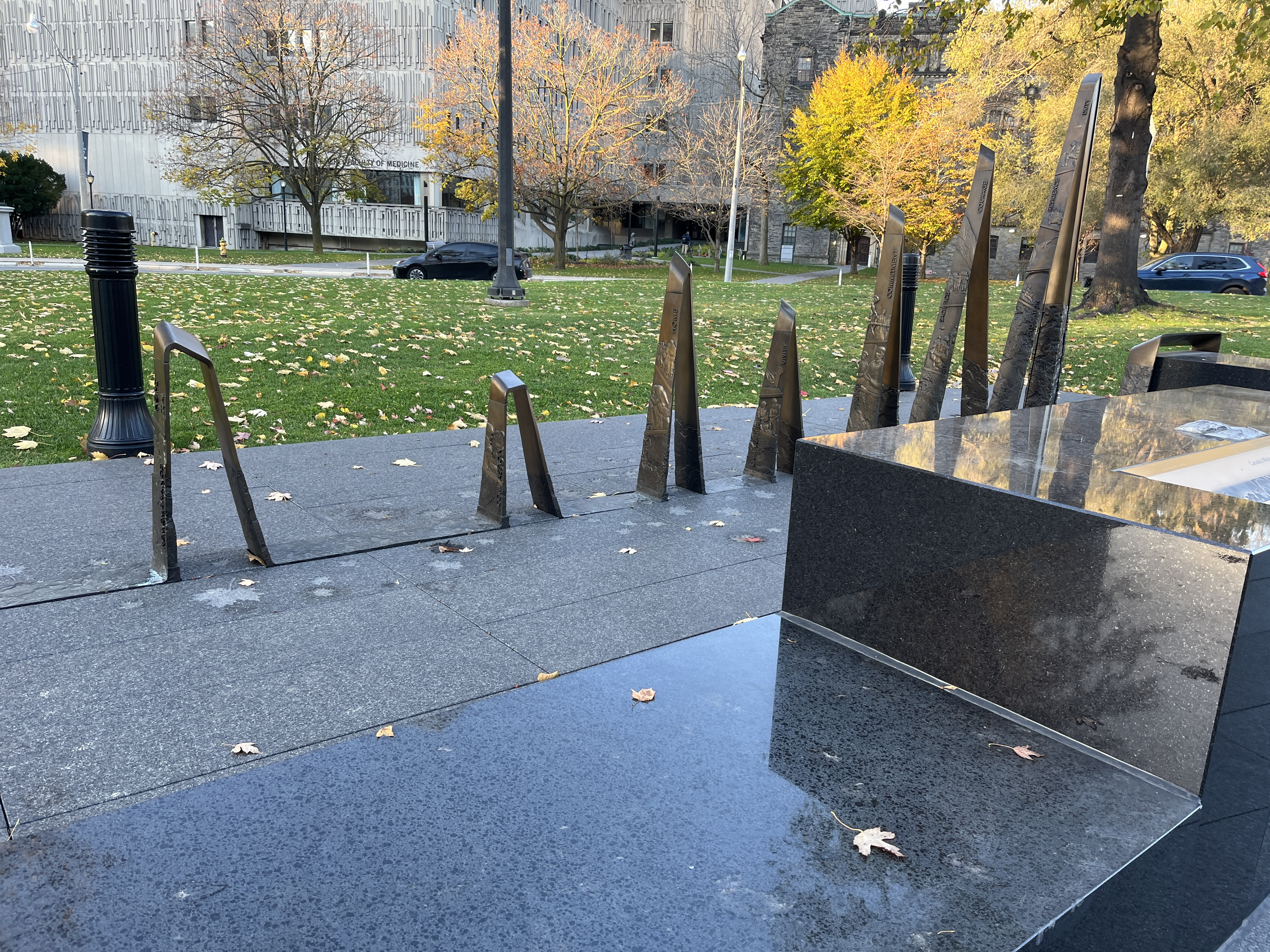
- The memorial in 2023
- Interactive map of Afghanistan Memorial
- Location: Toronto, Ontario, Canada
- Coordinates: 43°39′40.9″N 79°23′30.6″W

The Afghanistan Memorial is installed in Toronto's Queen's Park, in Ontario, Canada. Unveiled in 2020, the monument commemorates the over 40,000 Canadians who served in Afghanistan from 2001 to 2014. It has a bronze component and a stone from an Inukshuk that had been erected by Canadian soldiers at Kandahar Airfield.
