= Statue of Sun Yat-sen (Chinatown, Toronto) =

Sculpture in Toronto, Ontario, Canada

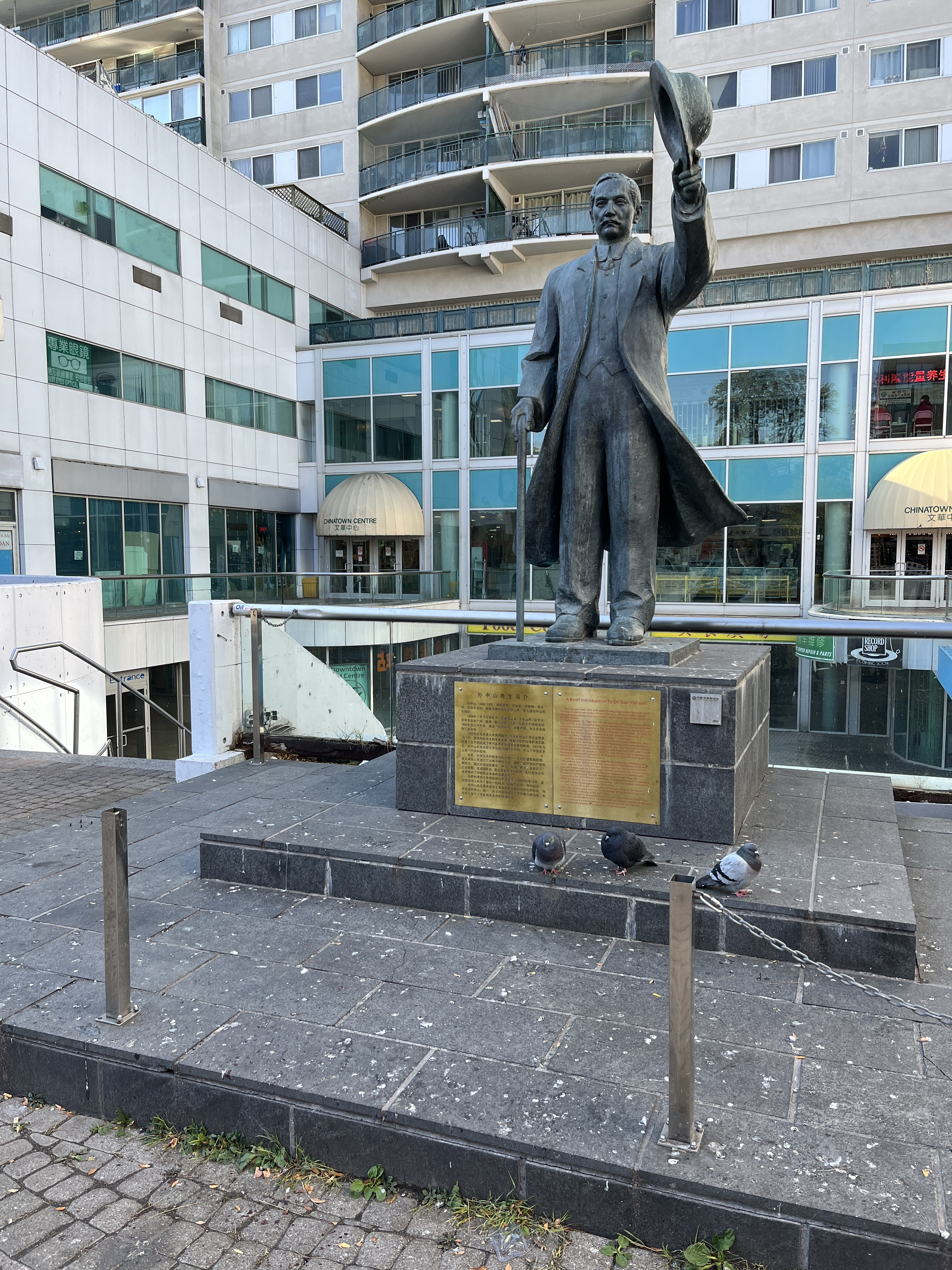
- The statue in 2023
- Subject: Sun Yat-sen
- Location: Toronto, Ontario, Canada; 43°39′4.6″N 79°23′52″W

A statue of Sun Yat-sen is installed outside the Chinatown Centre on Spadina in Chinatown, Toronto, in Ontario, Canada. The statue is not the city's only depicting Sun Yat-sen; one by Joe Rosenthal is installed in Riverdale Park.

== Gallery ==
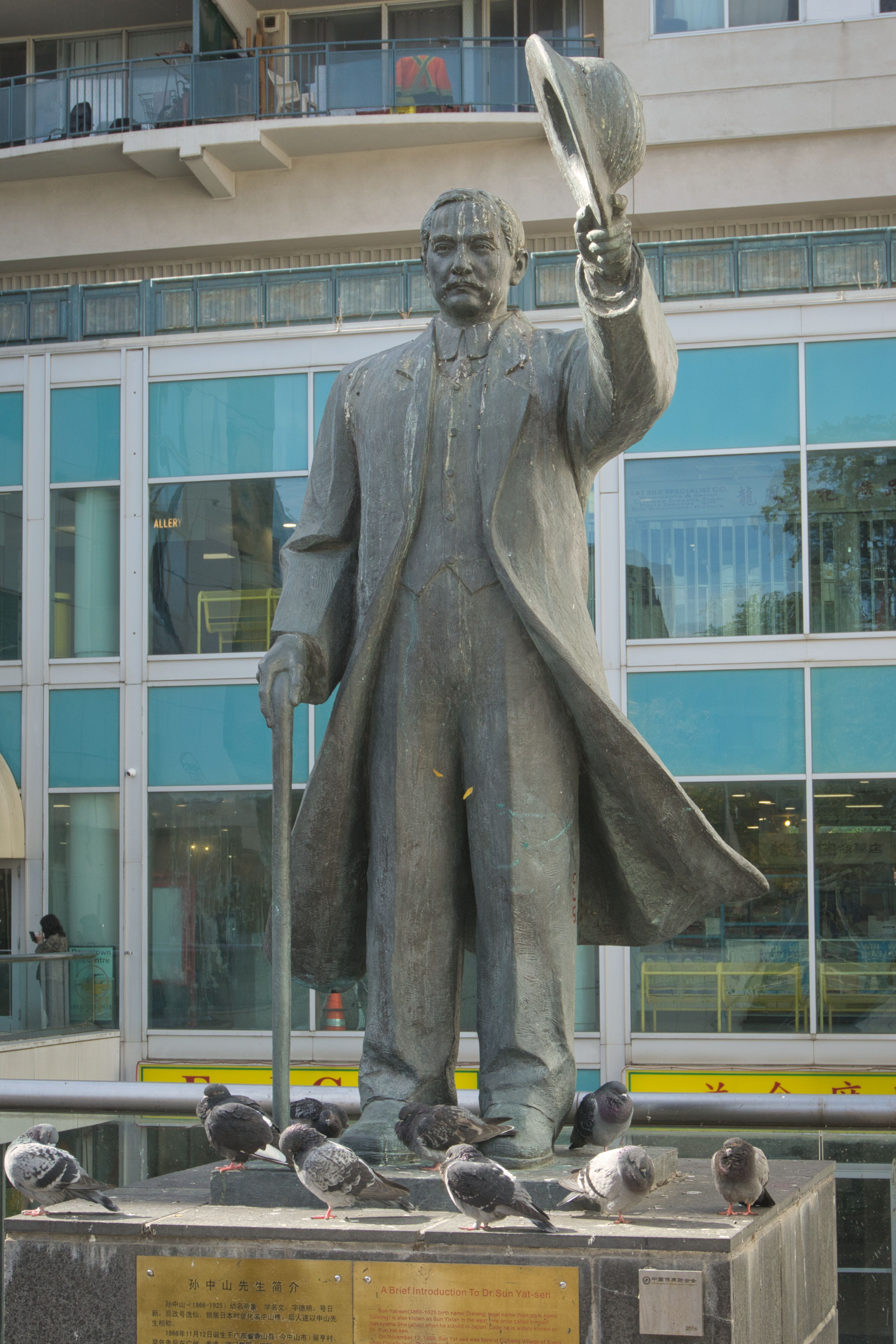
The sculpture in 2025

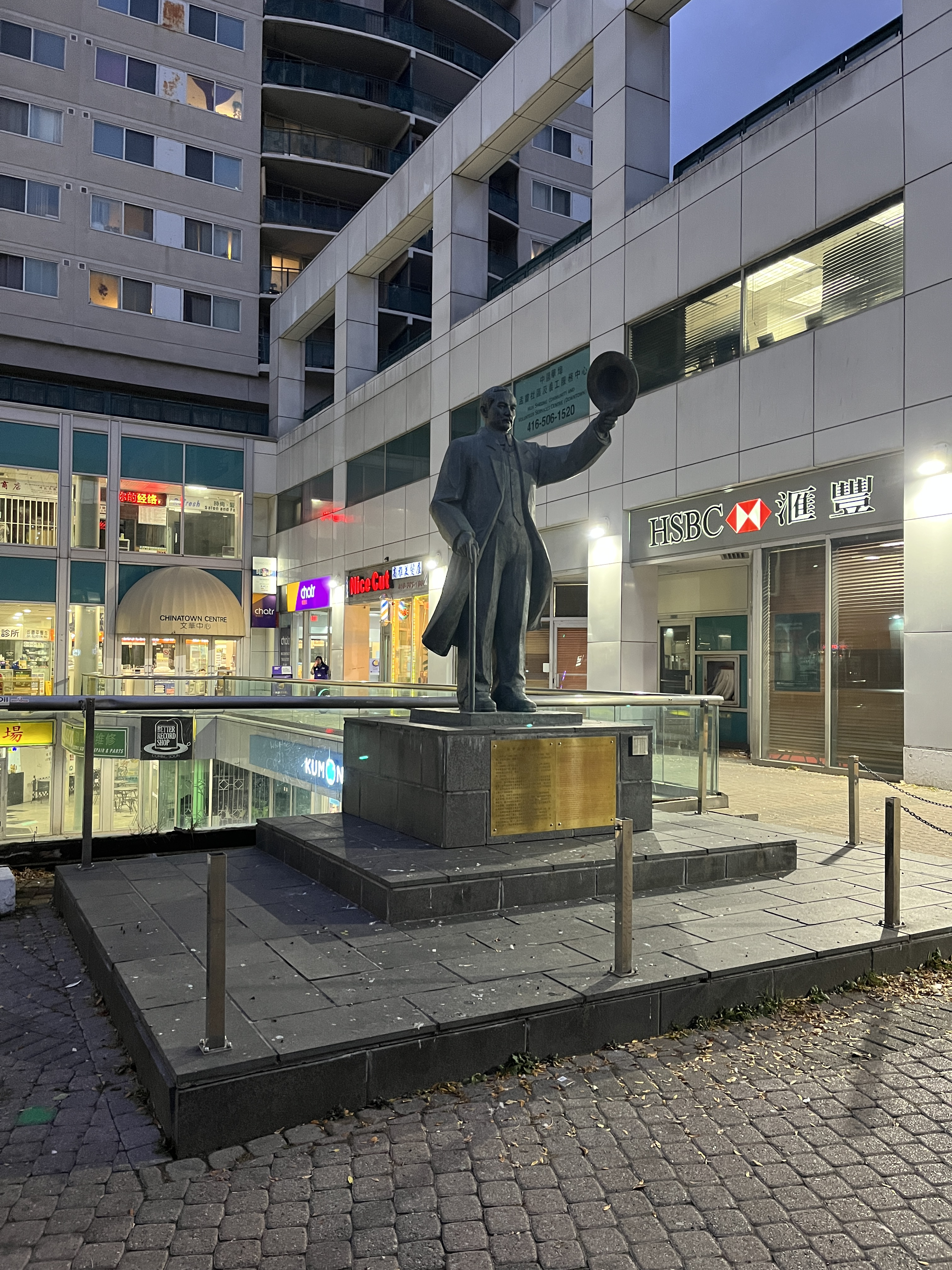
The statue in the evening
