= Megaptera (sculpture) =

Public artwork by Georg Schmerholz in Toronto, Ontario, Canada

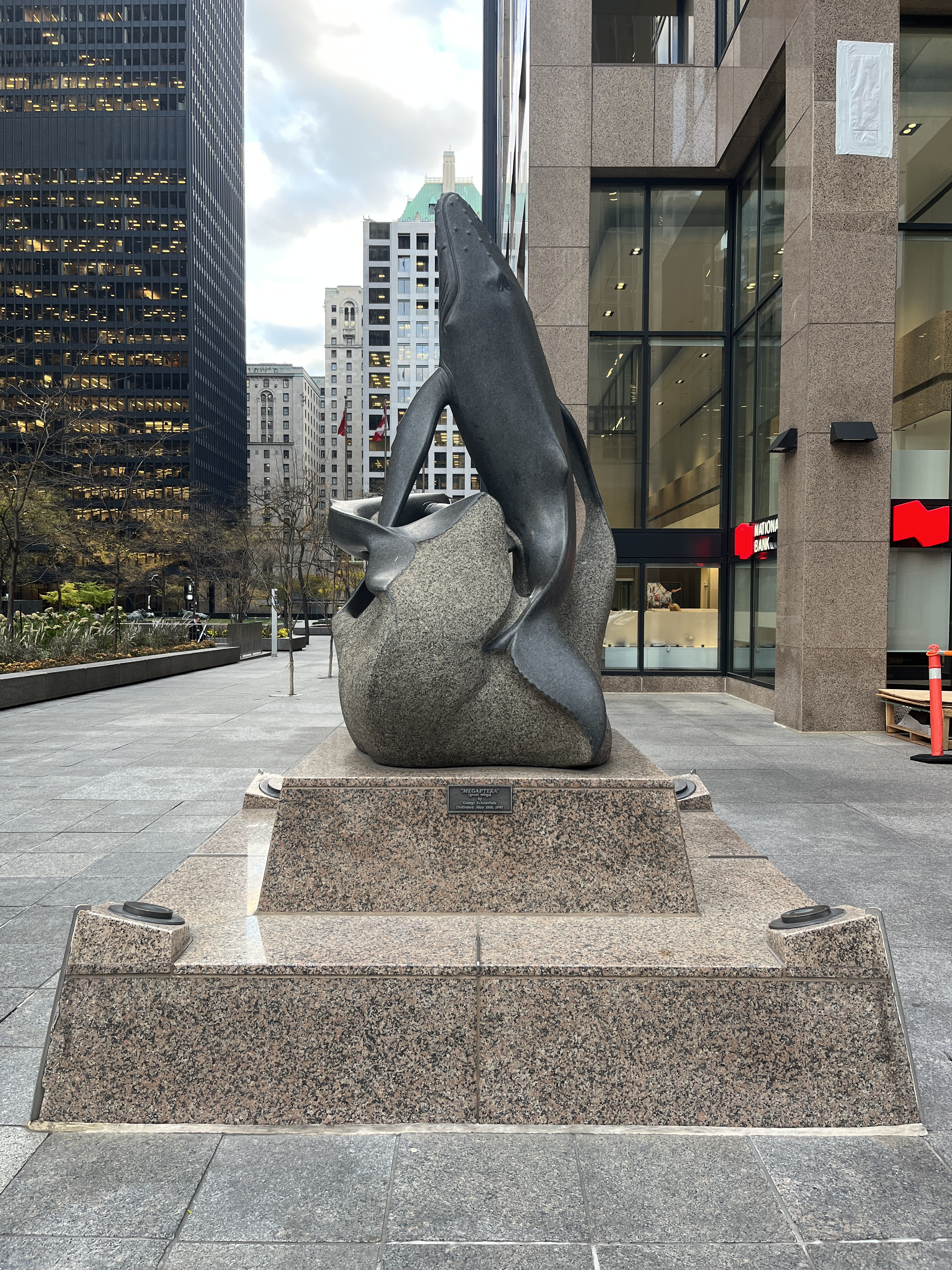
- The sculpture in 2023
- Artist: Georg Schmerholz
- Medium: Granite sculpture
- Location: Toronto, Ontario, Canada; 43°38′52.8″N 79°22′57.9″W

Megaptera is a 1993 granite sculpture of a humpback whale with her calf by Georg Schmerholz, installed in Toronto, Ontario, Canada.
