= Hours of the Day =

Memorial and sculpture in Toronto, Ontario, Canada

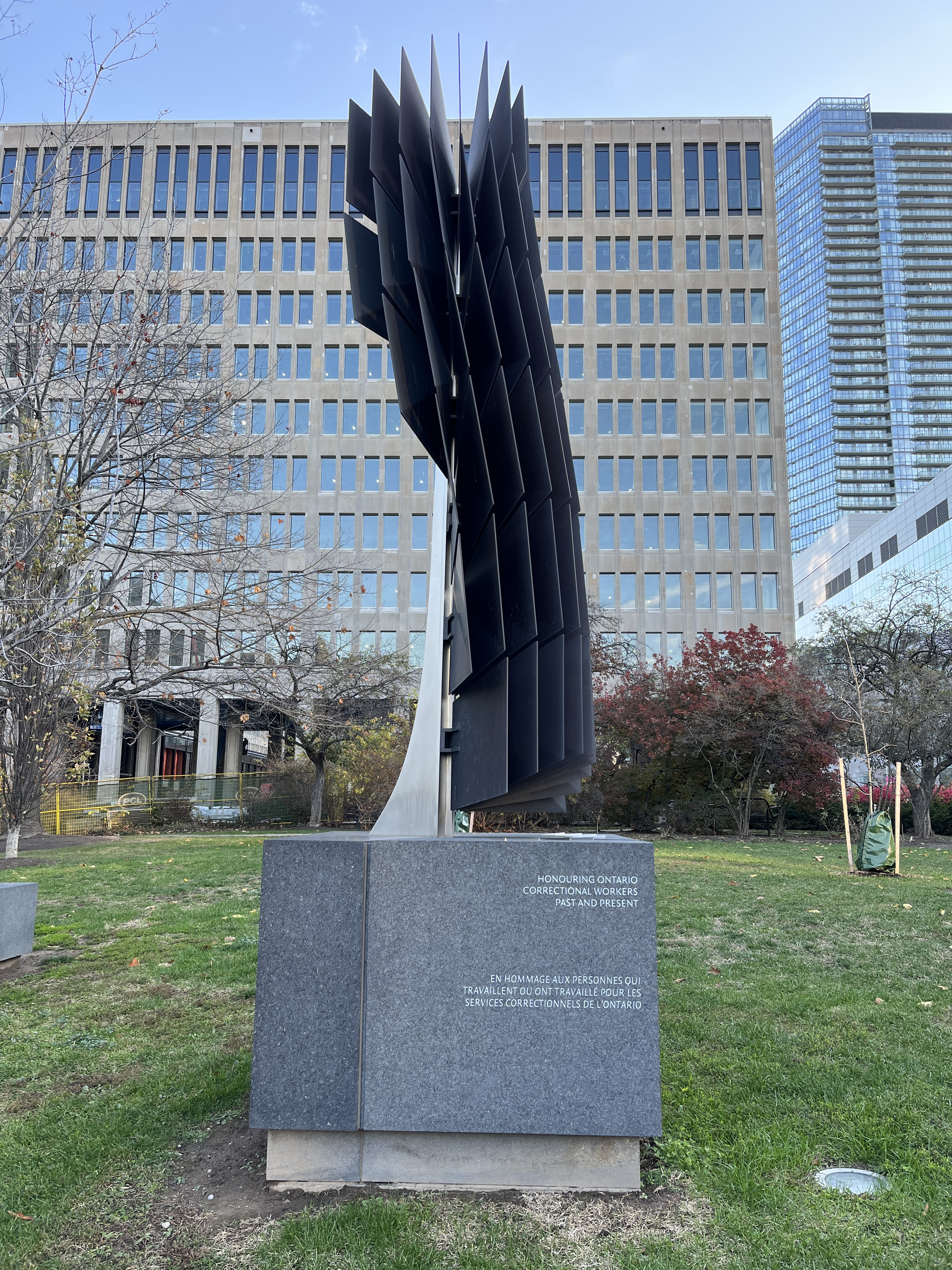
- The sculpture in 2023
- Artist: Paul Raff Studio
- Year: 2018
- Location: Toronto, Ontario, Canada; 43°39′44″N 79°23′21.3″W

Hours of the Day is an outdoor memorial and sculpture commemorating correctional workers by Paul Raff Studio, installed in Toronto, Ontario, Canada. The work was unveiled in 2018.
