= Princess Margaret Fountain =

Fountain in Toronto, Ontario, Canada

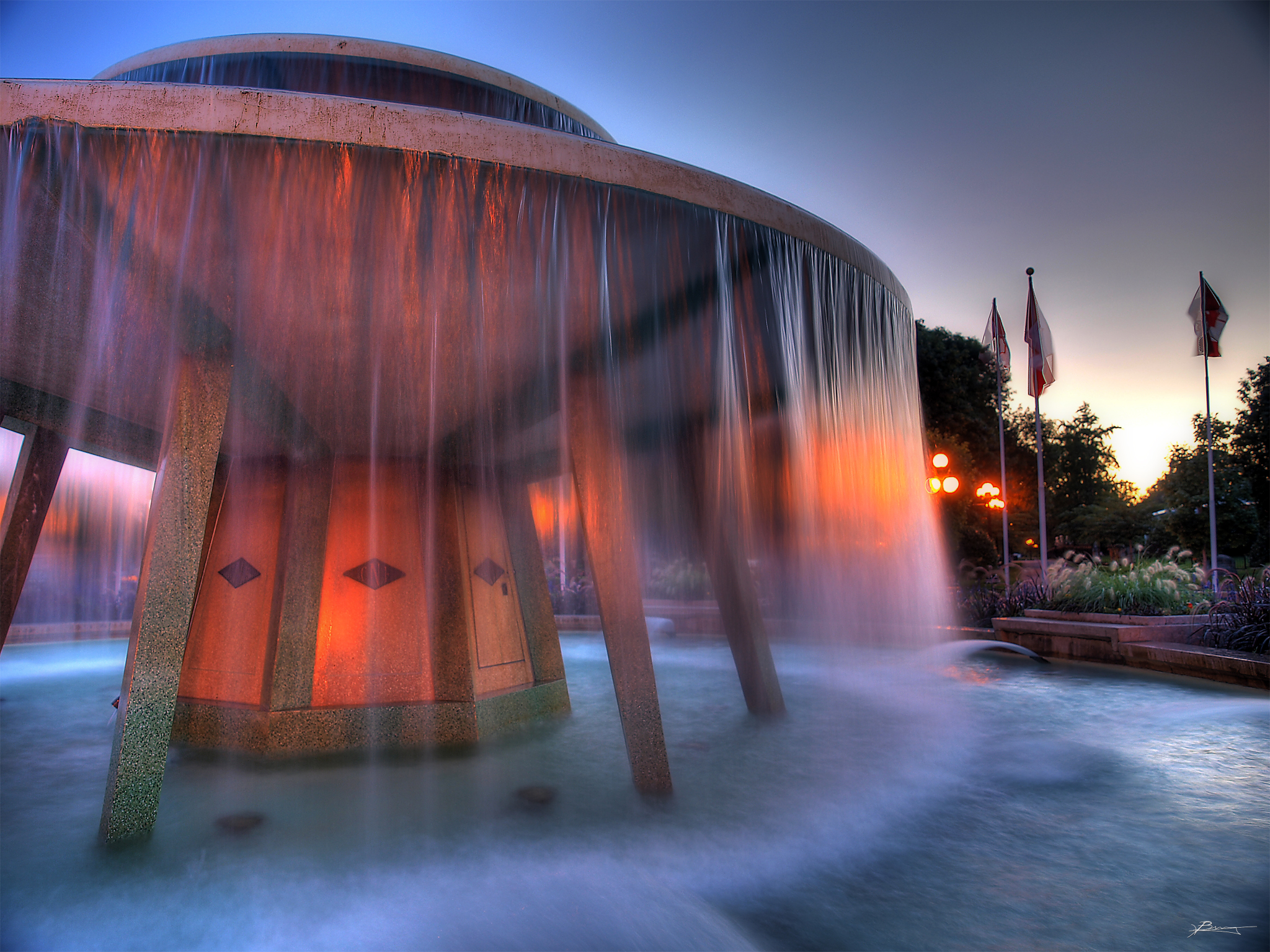
- The fountain in 2008
- Dimensions: 3.6m cm
- Location: Toronto, Ontario, Canada
- 43°37′56.6″N 79°25′20″W

Princess Margaret Fountain is a ceremonial fountain at Exhibition Place, in Toronto, Ontario, Canada. It is situated at Princes' Boulevard and Manitoba Drive in the plaza.

The fountain is approximately 3.6 metres (12 ft) tall. It has two levels. Water sprays onto the top crown and spills down to a larger circular dish. From the dish, water spills down all around the dish into a large pool. The lower base is illuminated at night and the fountain base is surrounded by a flower garden. It is constructed of concrete and steel and was designed by Design Craft Limited of Toronto.

Princess Margaret consented to the naming of the new fountain in July 1958. On July 31, 1958, on a visit to Toronto, Margaret pressed a button to ceremonially turn it on. The fountain was estimated to cost CA$300,000 (equivalent to $3,100,658 in 2023).

There was a fountain previously on the site. A plaque reads, "In 1911 a fountain, which was a replica of one in St. Peter's Square, Rome, Italy, was erected on this site and presented to the Canadian National Exhibition by Mr. George H. Gooderham during his final year as President. That fountain was replaced by the present one in 1958." A plan was proposed to restore the Gooderham fountain at another site on the grounds, but this was abandoned.

The Princess Margaret Foundation was given a heritage designation in 1993 by Toronto City Council.
