= Statue of Norman Bethune =

Sculpture in Toronto, Ontario, Canada

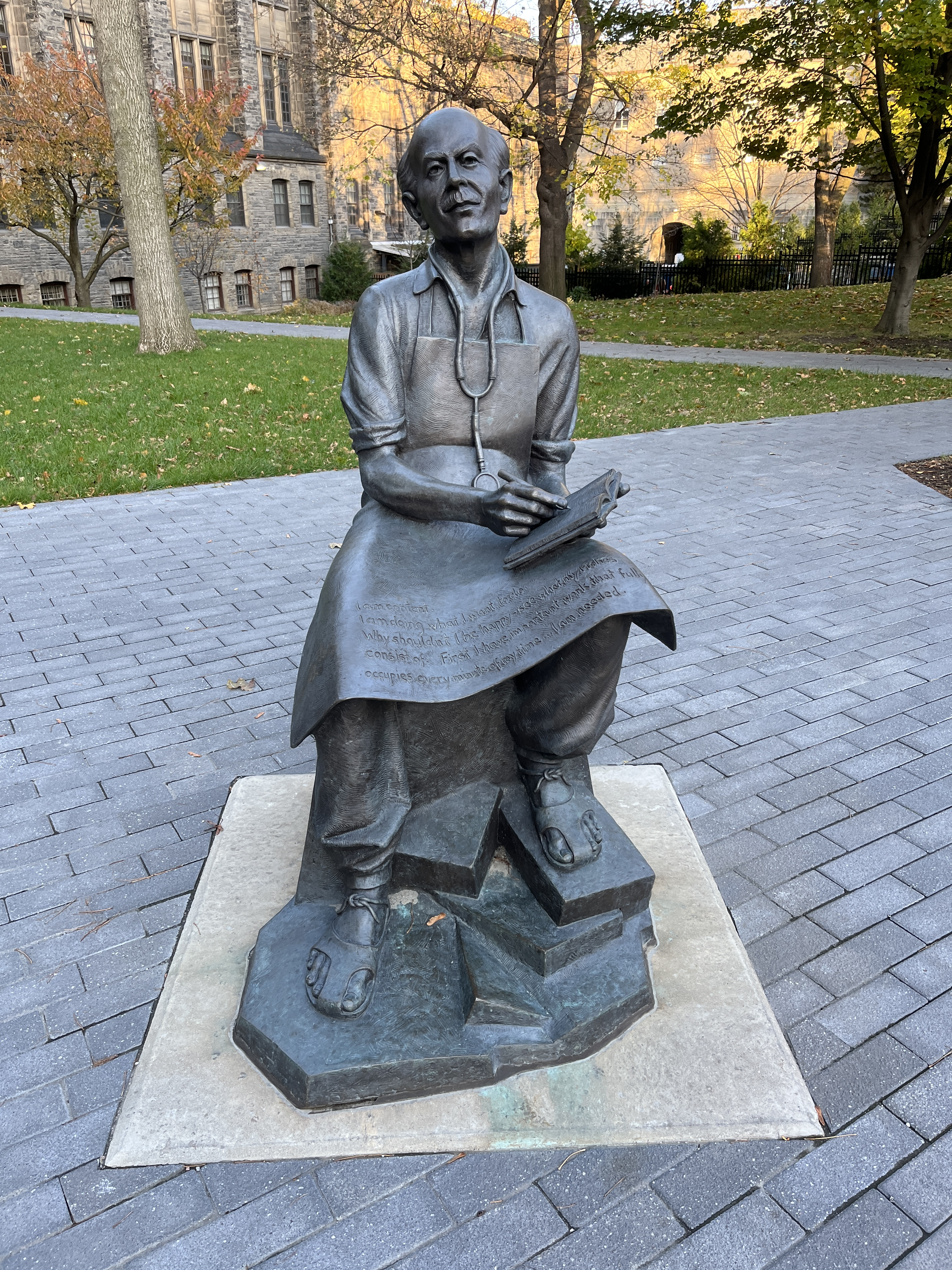
- The statue in 2023
- Subject: Norman Bethune
- Location: Toronto, Ontario, Canada; 43°39′39.9″N 79°23′32.7″W

A statue of Norman Bethune is installed on the St. George campus of the University of Toronto in Toronto, Ontario, Canada.
