= Statue of John Sandfield Macdonald =

Sculpture in Toronto, Ontario, Canada

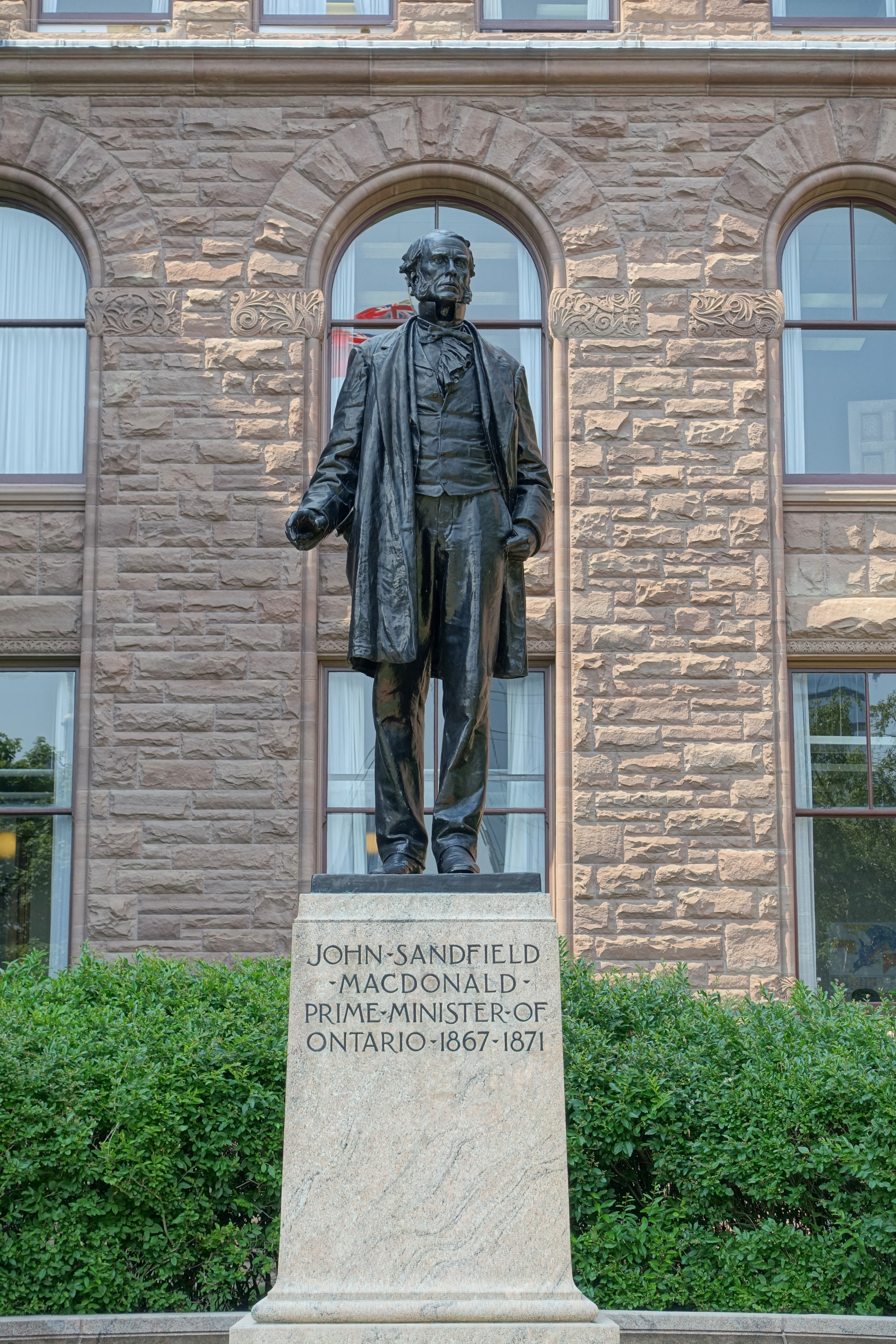
- The statue in 2015
- Location: 43°39′44″N 79°23′28″W

A statue of John Sandfield Macdonald is installed in Toronto's Queen's Park, in Ontario, Canada. The sculpture was created by Walter Allward and unveiled in 1909.
