= Shrine Peace Memorial =

Memorial sculpture in Exhibition Place, Toronto, Ontario

- Memorial
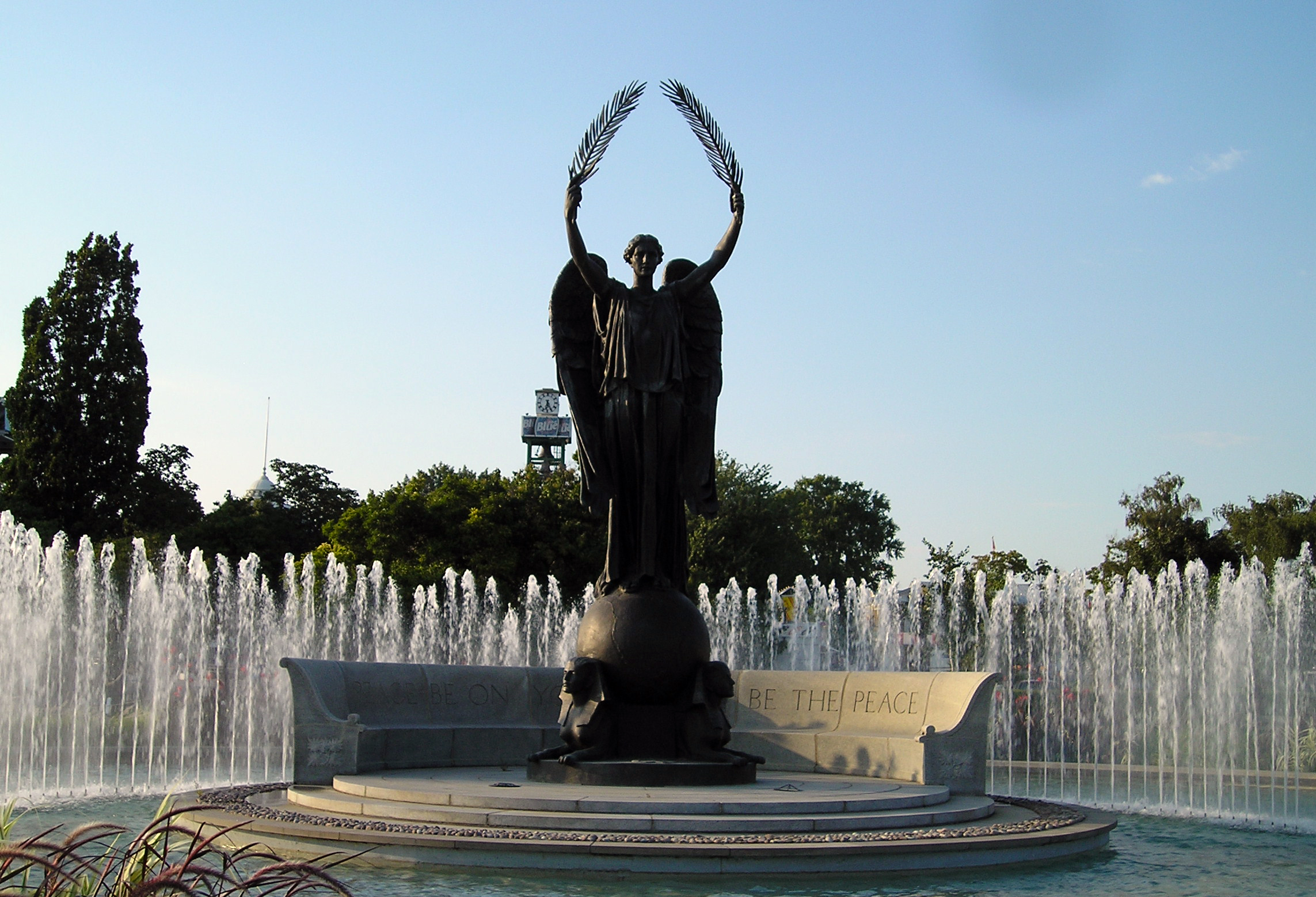
- Shrine Peace Memorial
- Design: Charles Keck
- Owner: City of Toronto
- Location: Exhibition Place; Toronto, Ontario, Canada
- Location of Memorial in Toronto
- Coordinates: 43°37′50.8″N 79°25′20.1″W

The Shrine Peace Memorial is a memorial sculpture on the grounds of Exhibition Place in Toronto, Ontario, Canada. The monument was presented to the people of Canada on June 12, 1930 by the Ancient Arabic Order Nobles of the Mystic Shrine (better known as the Shriners) as a symbol of peace and friendship between the United States and Canada. It is also meant as "an ongoing reminder that Freemasonry actively promotes the ideals of peace, harmony, and prosperity for all humankind". The location is thought to be the location that American troops landed during the War of 1812 for the Battle of York.

The monument depicts a winged angel holding aloft a crown of olive branches and standing upon a globe held aloft by female sphinxes. The statue was created by sculptor Charles Keck, who was a member of the Kismet Temple of Brooklyn, New York. A bench surrounds the statue, bearing the words "PEACE BE ON YOU", and its response "ON YOU BE THE PEACE", which together make up the Shrine motto. The statue and bench is surrounded by a circular fountain. It is situated immediately south of the Bandshell, and is the focal point of the surrounding rose garden.

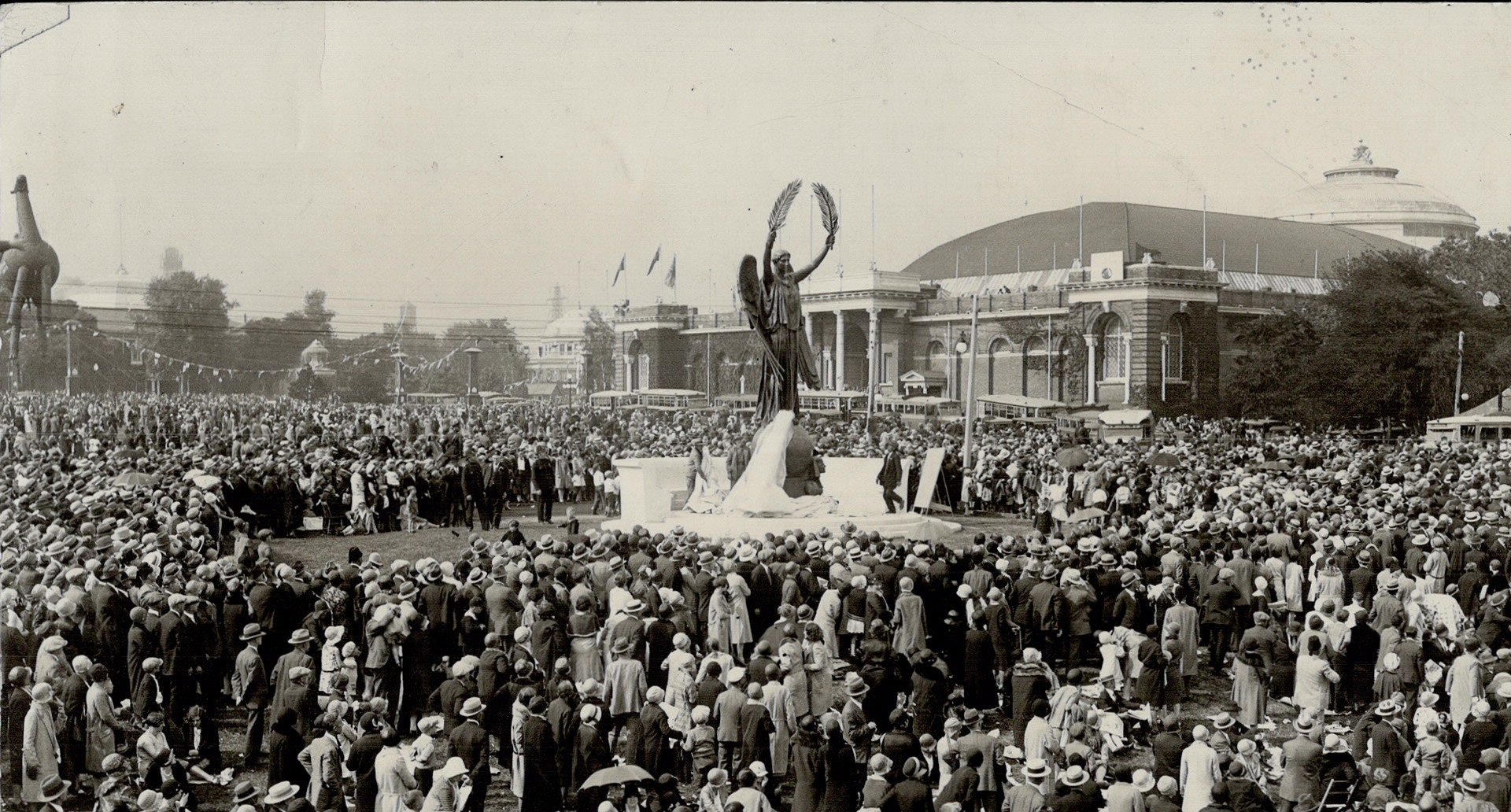
Unveiling of Shriners' Memorial in 1930

The monument was originally dedicated as part of a large ceremony on the final day of a Shriners' summit held in Toronto that year. It was dedicated by the Imperial Potentate of the Shrine of North America, Leo V. Youngworth. United States Secretary of State Henry L. Stimson spoke via radio from Washington and Canadian Prime Minister Mackenzie King spoke via radio from Ottawa, and Ontario Highways Minister George Stewart Henry, who was the Potentate of Rameses Temple No. 33 of Toronto also made an address. The statue was formally received by Toronto Mayor Bert Sterling Wemp as a "sacred trust".

In 1958, the surrounding rose gardens and fountain were erected by the Toronto Parks Department. The memorial and gardens were re-dedicated to the cause of peace by Canadian Prime Minister John Diefenbaker on August 20, 1958. It was again re-dedicated by the Shriners in 1989.
