= Krystyna Sadowska =

Polish-Canadian Artist

- Born: 1912; Lubin, Poland
- Died: 2000 (aged 87–88)
- Known for: Metalwork sculpture, tapestry, ceramics

Krystyna Sadowska (1912–2000) was a contemporary artist from Lubin, Poland known for her metalwork statues, ceramics and tapestries. Her work can be found in the collections of the AGO, The Art Gallery of Windsor, The Government of Ontario Art Collection, and many more.

== Early life ==
Krystyna Sadowska was born on June 2, 1912, in Lublin, Poland, and was one of 4 children. She had a passion for art from a young age, and would draw whenever she got the chance. Her parents, Wladyslaw and Kazimiera Kopezynski, were middle class. Her mother worked at a fashion boutique, while her father worked for the National Library. Due to her father's work, she would take scraps of paper refuse from her father's bookbinding and use it to draw every chance she got. As she got older, her talent grew, and she eventually applied for the Warsaw Academy of Fine Arts, being accepted before she even finished high school. Around this time, tragedy struck as her father was hit by a train and killed, leaving Sadowska's mother to care for three children by herself. After the death of the family patriarch, the family moved to Warsaw, but money was tight. Sadowska often had to choose between buying food or paint, and she often chose paint. Once she completed her education at the Warsaw Academy of Fine Arts, she was offered numerous jobs, as she had become a very versatile artist during her studies. She was sent by the Polish government to go to Brazil and teach Polish expats handicrafts and art, and left for the country in 1937.

== Brazil ==
After arriving in Brazil, she traveled to Parana, a state in the southeast of Brazil. Her time in the country was difficult, as the region she would be teaching in was almost completely jungle and homes were very far from each other. The Polish Consulate gave her two horses, and with them she would ride house-to-house teaching weaving and other crafts to the primarily Jewish Poles living there. She spent two-three years in the country initially, organizing exhibitions of her students' work and earning a gold medal from the government herself. It was at this time that she met her first husband, Konrad Sadowska, when he came to Brazil to teach and inform Sadowska of her mother's death.

== The War ==
Sadowska and her husband moved back to Poland around the outbreak of the second World War, and the government decided to send the pair to the Stanisławów region to teach pottery. She intended to organize a proper school for pottery there, but not long after being sent to the region, the Russian troops began to arrive. Not wanting to fall into the hands of the Russians, Sadowska joined a group of refugees to cross the border into Hungary. She later continued on to Paris, England and other Allied countries. During her time in Europe, she studied at the Central School of Arts and Crafts in London, The Académie de la Grande Chaumière in Paris, and put on exhibitions with other Polish refugees. She would move back to Brazil after the end of the war, and it was then that she learned of the deaths of her two sisters, who perished in the Warsaw uprisings.

== Move to Canada ==
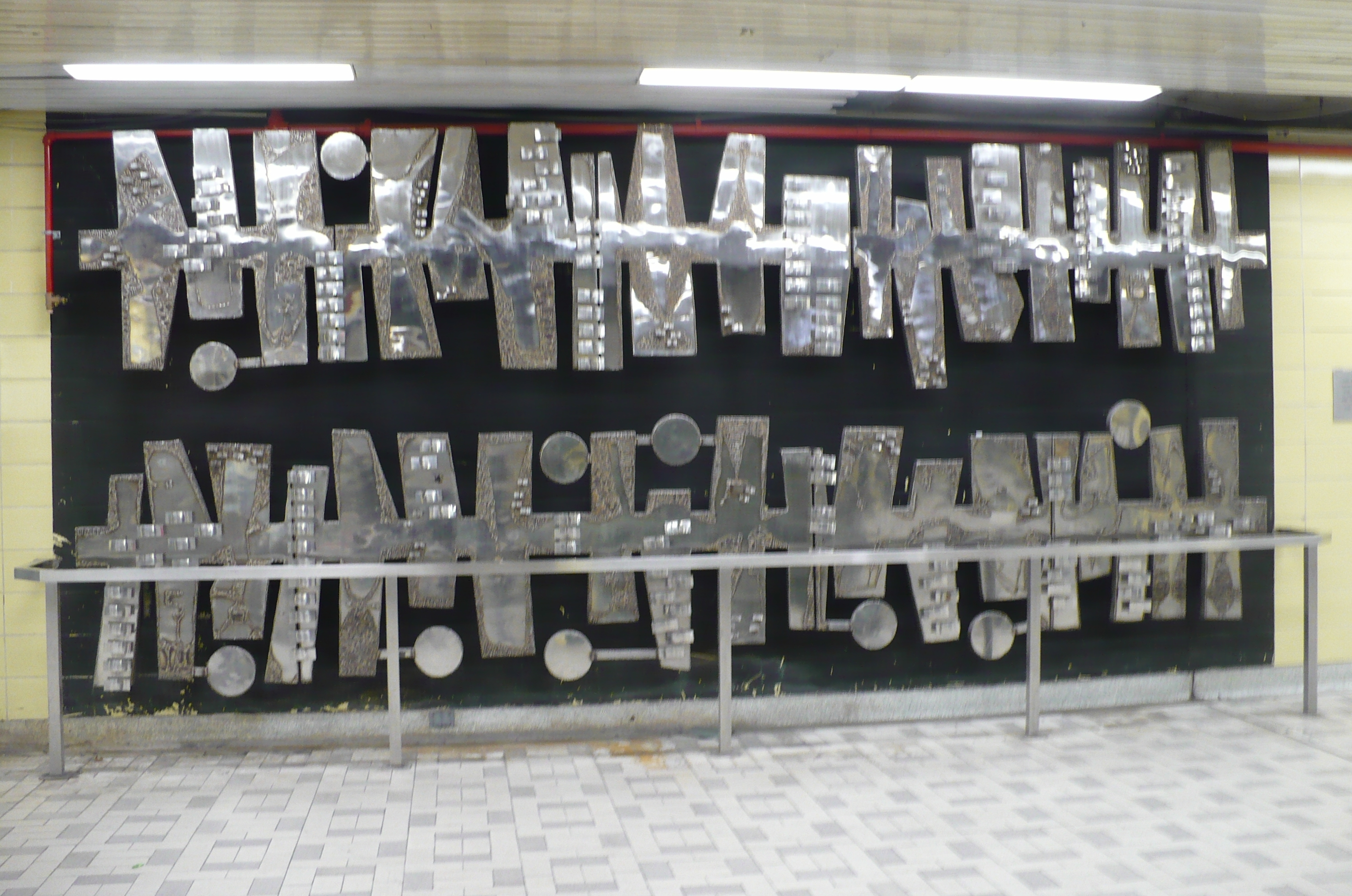
Krystyna Sadowska's sculpture "Rhythm of Exotic Plants" at Finch Subway Station in Toronto

While in Brazil for the second time, she was invited by the government to put on a show in the capital, Rio de Janeiro. Sadowska exhibited a number of tapestries at the show, with one titled Dream of Canada catching the attention of a member of the Canadian consulate. She was invited to move to Canada and she agreed. Sadowska and her husband Konrad initially moved to Nova Scotia in 1949, teaching at the Handcraft Center in Halifax before eventually settling down and starting their own in-house pottery studio in Indian Harbor. She was offered a job at the Ontario College of Art in Toronto by the director of the institution, and after taking the position, the pair made the move to Toronto in 1953 and headed up the ceramics studio at the college. During her time in Toronto, Sadowska took on a number of major commissions from the Canadian government and other large organizations, both in Canada and abroad.

== Later life ==
Toward the end of the 1950s, Sadowska's husband started battling lung disease which took his life not long after it began. She remarried in the late 1960s to a man named Stephen Siwinski, a Polish-born furniture designer living in Toronto. She lived with him for the last 30 years of her life, before dying due to lung cancer.

== Notable works ==
- Homage to the Legendary and Modern Woman, 1967, Government of Ontario Art Collection
- Rhythm of Exotic Plants, 1965, Finch TTC Station, Toronto
- Untitled (1), 1967, 191-201 Sherbourne St., Toronto
- Untitled (2), 1967, Cawthra Rd., Mississauga
- Early Morning Dream, 1972, University of Waterloo, Waterloo

== Notable exhibits ==
- Montreal Museum of Fine Art, 1953
- Art Gallery of Windsor, 1977 - Her first Retrospective
- Art Gallery of Nova Scotia, 2014–2015

== Awards ==
- 1937 World Exhibition of Tapestry, Paris, France - Gold Medal
- 1947 Brazilian Government for tapestry - Silver Medal
- 1949 International Textile Exhibition, Greensboro, USA - 2nd Prize
- 1953 lst Exhibition of Canadian Weaving, London Art Museum, Ontario - 1st Prize for tapestry and Grand Award
- 1958 XX Ceramics International, Syracuse Museum of Fine Arts, USA - Drakenfeld Prize
- 1961 Canadian Handicraft Exhibition, Montreal - 1st Prize for tapestry
