= Rhonda Weppler and Trevor Mahovsky =

Canadian collaborative artist duo

Rhonda Weppler (born 1972) and Trevor Mahovsky (born 1969) are a Canadian collaborative artist duo. They are known for their collaborative works in sculpture.

== Biography ==
Rhonda Weppler was born in Winnipeg, Manitoba in 1972. Trevor Mahovsky was born in Calgary, Alberta in 1969. They met in 1986 at the University of British Columbia, where they both received MFA degrees. They have worked collaboratively since 2004.

== Public sculpture ==
Their 2012 work A False Creek, a set of chromatic markers built around the pilings of Vancouver's Cambie Bridge, is meant to mark rising seas caused by global warming.

== Collections ==
Their work is included in the collections of the Canada Council Art Bank, the Vancouver Art Gallery and the National Gallery of Canada.
