= William McElcheran =

Canadian sculptor (1927–1999)

- Born: 17 September 1927; Hamilton, Ontario, Canada
- Died: 13 February 1999 (aged 71); Hamilton, Ontario, Canada
- Education: Ontario College of Art
- Awards: Lieutenant-Governor's Medal (1948)
- Website: www.williammcelcheran.com

William Hodd McElcheran (17 September 1927 – 13 February 1999) was a Canadian designer and sculptor.

== Career ==
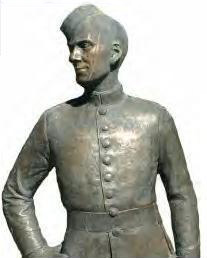
William McElcheran created the Royal Military College Club of Canada's centennial gift, Truth Duty Valour, in 1976. The miniature statues are now known as "Brucie".

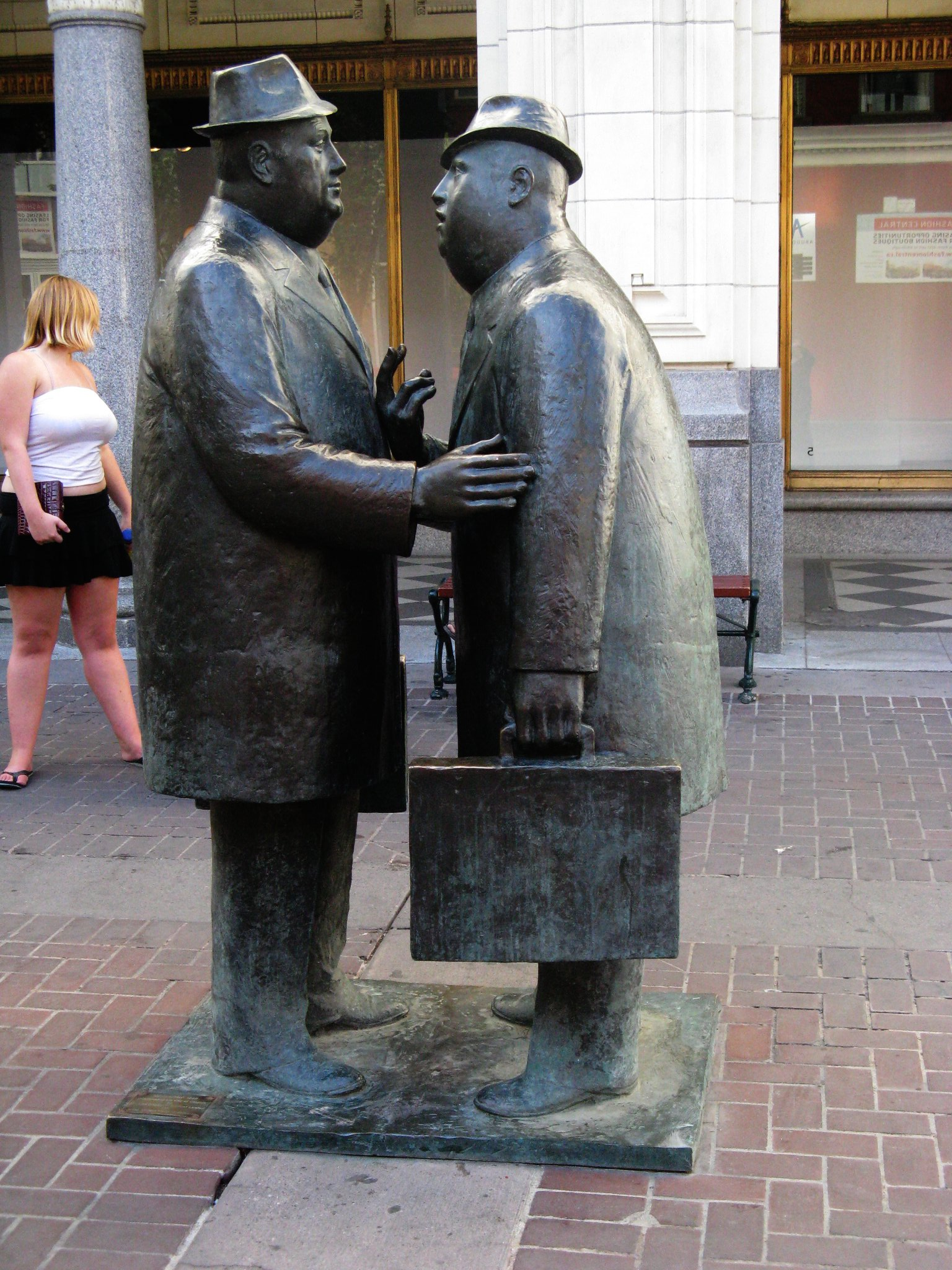
The Conversation in Calgary

McElcheran began modeling portraits as a boy at the age of 10. When he was 16, he was granted an advanced second-year standing at the Ontario College of Art where he studied until 1948, receiving training as a carpenter and designer. During his time at the College, he earned a painting scholarship, and upon graduating at the top of his class in 1948, was awarded the Lieutenant-Governor's Medal. In the mid-fifties, he was employed by Bruce Brown and Brisely Architects in Toronto as a liturgical designer. During his employment, he became their lead designer for church and university buildings, and made a significant impact on architectural interior design. In 1958, he played a major role in the development of McMaster Divinity College and Chapel, contributing sculptures in stone and wood to the interior.

McElcheran began sculpting in the early sixties with wood, and later used bronze and other materials. After 1970, McElcheran started work on his pieces The Crowd, The (Rat) Race and Businessman, for display in Canadian cities. He continued to develop themes of futility and corporatization in his sculptures until his death.

He went to Italy in 1975 and resided in Pietrasanta. After returning to Canada, he commissioned a fountain scene (The Family Fountain) for the city of Guelph.

== Selected works ==
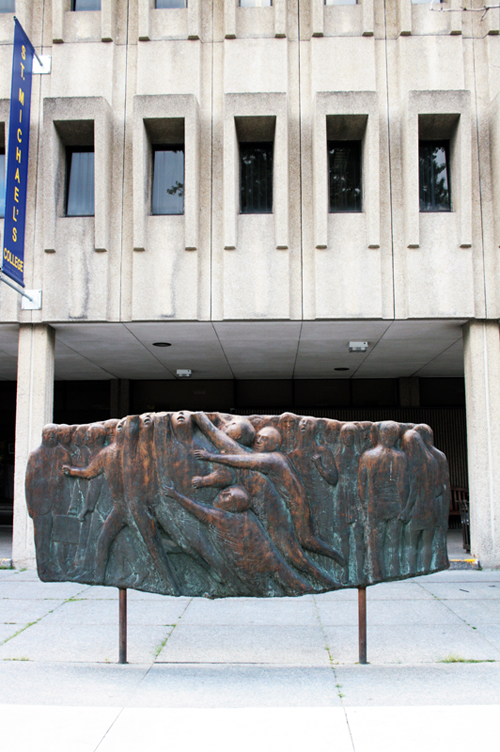
John M. Kelly Library at University of Toronto featuring Untitled by William McElcheran

- The Race (1966), at the front of Rodman Hall Art Centre in St. Catharines
- Untitled – bronze sculpture, relief (1973), John M. Kelly Library – University of Toronto (first in plastic, a few years later in Italy in bronze)
- Businessman (1980), Wellington Street in Toronto and Cobourg (Ontario)
- The Conversation (1981), Stephen Avenue in Calgary
- Cross Section (1984), bas relief at TTC TMU Station in Toronto
- The Family (1985), fountain at Quebec Street and Wydnham Street N in Guelph
- Businessman Walking (1986), King Street and St. Clair Avenue in Toronto
- The Encounter (1986), Commerce Court Courtyard near Bay Street and King Street East in Toronto
- Three Businessmen and Career Woman, outside of Hotel Continental Tirrenia, Via Belvedere in Pisa (Italy)
- Veni Vidi Vici (1989), University of Toronto and the Odette Sculpture Park in Windsor
- The Boss (1989)
- Che Fa? or What's Happening (1995), 108 Cumberland Street, Toronto (Yorkville)
- The Mob or Hunting Party (in plaster), The Village, Toronto
- Encounter (1997), bronze sculpture of two businessmen (1958, 3 of 4), York University in Toronto (outside courtyard next to Student Centre)
- Timewise (year unknown), At the entrance of John C. Munro Hamilton International Airport, Hamilton, Ontario
