= Spirit of Discovery (sculpture) =

2005 sculpture by Veronica and Edwin Dam de Nogales

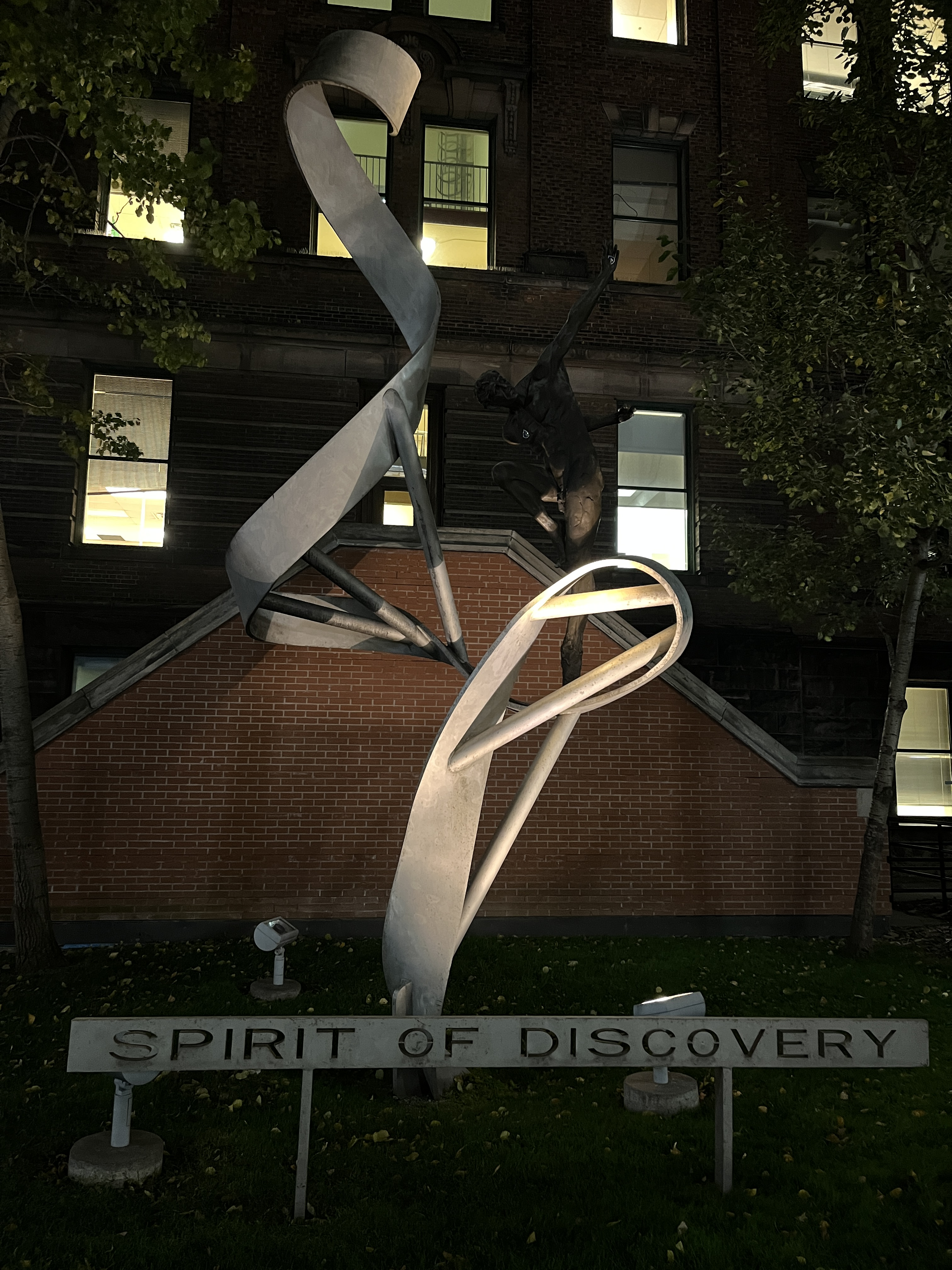
- The sculpture at night, 2023
- Artist: Veronica and Edwin Dam de Nogales
- Location: Toronto, Ontario, Canada; 43°39′35″N 79°23′34.5″W

Spirit of Discovery is a 2005 sculpture by Veronica and Edwin Dam de Nogales, installed on the St. George campus of the University of Toronto at the Donnelly Centre for Cellular and Biomolecular Research in Toronto, Ontario, Canada.

The bronze and stainless steel figurative artwork measures 8m x 4.5m x 4m. The artists have said, "The sculpture attempts to capture not only the activity of the research centre, but the very spirit behind this research. There is in medicine and in art a unique connectivity of subject and subject matter … this work attempts to capture this … the figure is in unison with the protein structure, mimicking its every twist and turn … there in his reach is anticipation, hope and a sought objective … discovery within grasp."
