= TMU station =

Toronto subway station

TMU
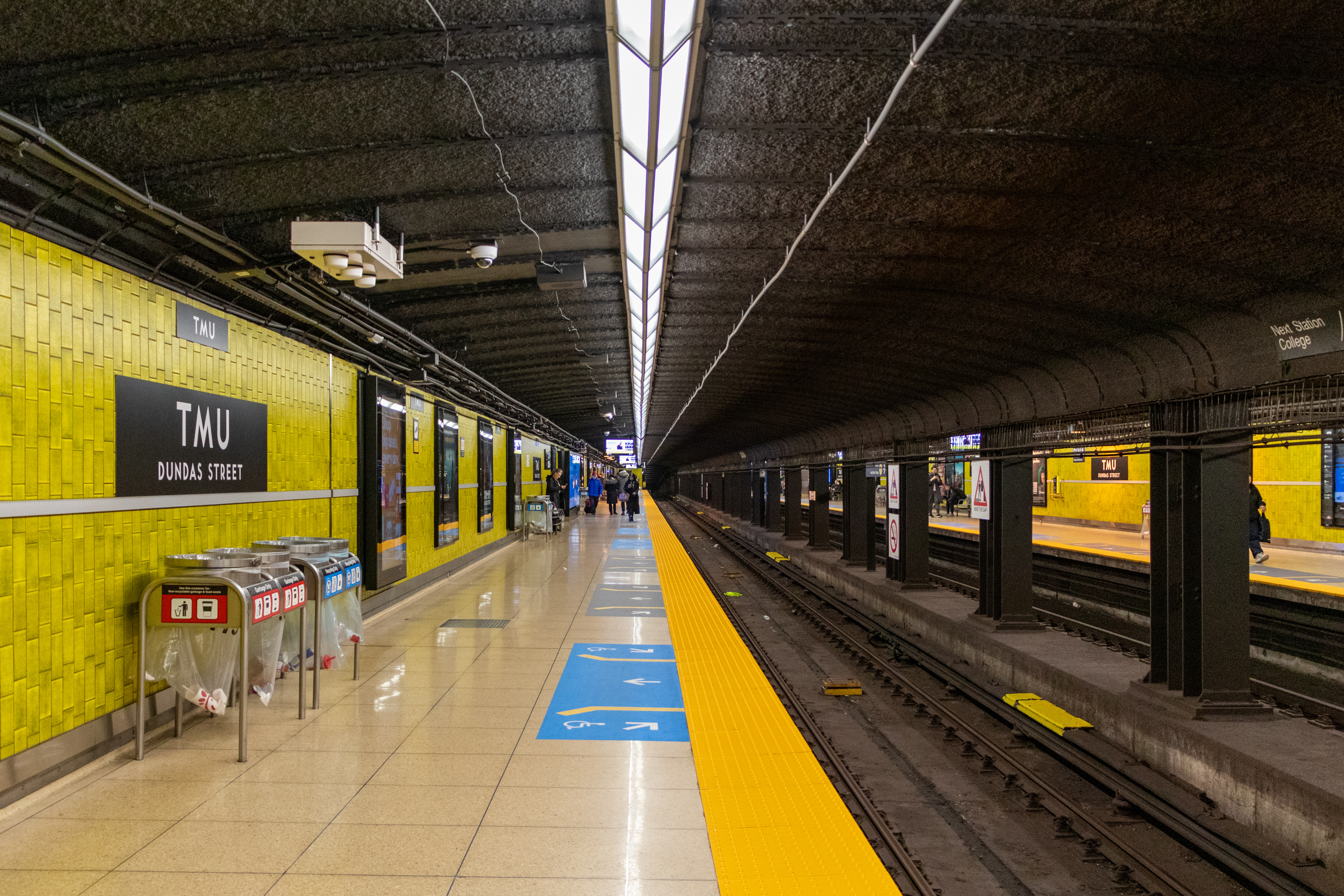
- Station platform

General information
- Location: 3 Dundas Street East; Toronto, Ontario; Canada
- Coordinates: 43°39′24″N 79°22′52″W
- Platforms: Side platforms
- Tracks: 2
- Connections: TTC buses and streetcars: 97 Yonge; 305 Dundas; 320 Yonge; 505 Dundas

Construction
- Structure type: Underground
- Accessible: Yes

Other information
- Website: Official station page

History
- Opened: March 30, 1954; 72 years ago
- Former names: Dundas (1954–2025)

Passengers
- 2023–2024: 72,406
- Rank: 5 of 70

Services
Preceding station	Toronto Transit Commission	Following station
Queen towards Vaughan	Line 1 Yonge–University	College towards Finch
Location

TMU (formerly Dundas) is a Toronto subway station on Line 1 Yonge–University in Toronto, Ontario, Canada. It is located at the intersection of Yonge Street and Dundas Street near Sankofa Square. The station was known as Dundas station before being renamed in 2025 following a partnership between the Toronto Transit Commission and Toronto Metropolitan University (TMU).

== History ==
The station was opened as Dundas in 1954 as part of the original stretch of the Yonge subway line from Union to Eglinton station. The original address, 300 Yonge Street, is still commonly used in TTC system maps.

When Toronto's Eaton Centre was built in the 1970s, a pedestrian tunnel was constructed under the tracks outside the fare-paid areas, connecting the two separate concourses. The station was refurbished in 1982, with the original Vitrolite tiles being replaced with yellow ceramic tiling.

As part of the construction of Yonge–Dundas Square (now Sankofa Square) in the early 2000s, a new entrance staircase was created, giving access to the station directly from the square. In 2002, this station became accessible with the addition of elevators.

=== Name ===
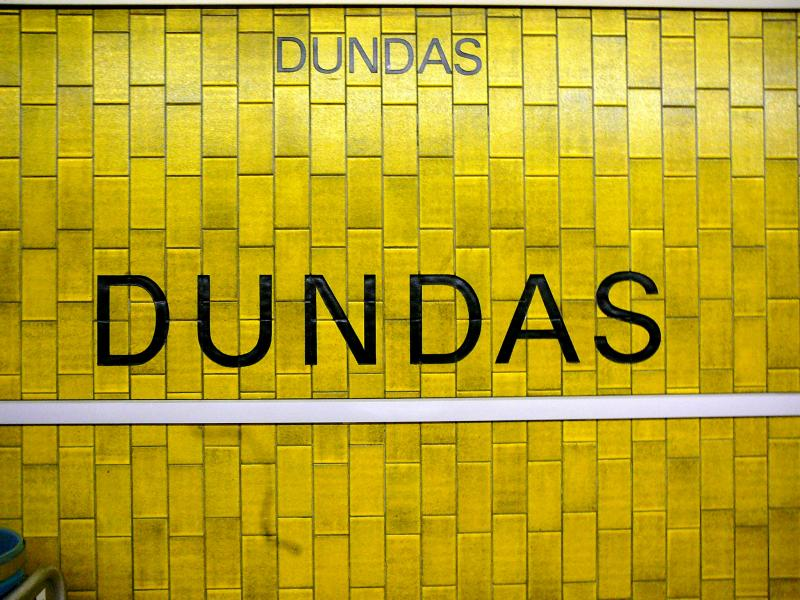
Former Dundas station name on the platform wall

When it first opened in 1954, this station was named Dundas after the nearby Dundas Street, which was named after British politician Henry Dundas.

In 2021, Toronto City Council voted to rename Dundas Street and other civic assets named after Dundas, including Dundas and Dundas West stations, due to Dundas's role in delaying the abolition of the transatlantic slave trade. In December 2023, Toronto City Council passed a motion that instructed the TTC to rename Dundas station by the fourth quarter of 2024. Toronto Metropolitan University expressed an interest in financing the renaming of the station if it was renamed in the university's honour. The TTC approved a proposal to rename the station TMU in May 2025, with the university agreeing to fund the costs associated with the transition. In November 2025, the TTC began erecting temporary signage reflecting the new name. The name change took effect on December 7, 2025.

=== Safety initiatives ===
In 2026, the TTC announced that TMU station would serve as a pilot location for new platform safety measures. Planned improvements included the installation of steel platform barriers near the platform edge and an artificial intelligence–based track intrusion detection system designed to identify and respond to potential track intrusions. The project forms part of the TTC's broader "Advancing Safety" strategy, which proposes similar measures at a number of high-volume stations across the network. Funding was secured for the TMU station pilot, with the TTC identifying up to ten stations as potential candidates for future installations.

At a June 2026 TTC Board meeting, TTC Chief Executive Officer Mandeep Lali described the platform barriers as an interim measure toward the eventual installation of full platform edge doors, which the agency considers the most effective means of preventing track intrusions. TTC staff estimated that installing platform edge doors at ten stations would cost approximately $500 million, or about $50 million per station. The proposal generated debate among board members, with some arguing that funds allocated to platform barriers should instead be directed toward platform edge doors.

However, by the end of August 2026, the TTC had begun installing safety barriers at the platform edge with gaps where the subway train doors would open. These would be similar to those used on the New York City Subway. The installation is a pilot project that, if successful, could be extended to other stations on Line 1. These safety barriers are not the same as platform edge doors, which leave no gaps for the full length of the platform. Platform barriers would cost $2 million per station.

== Station description ==
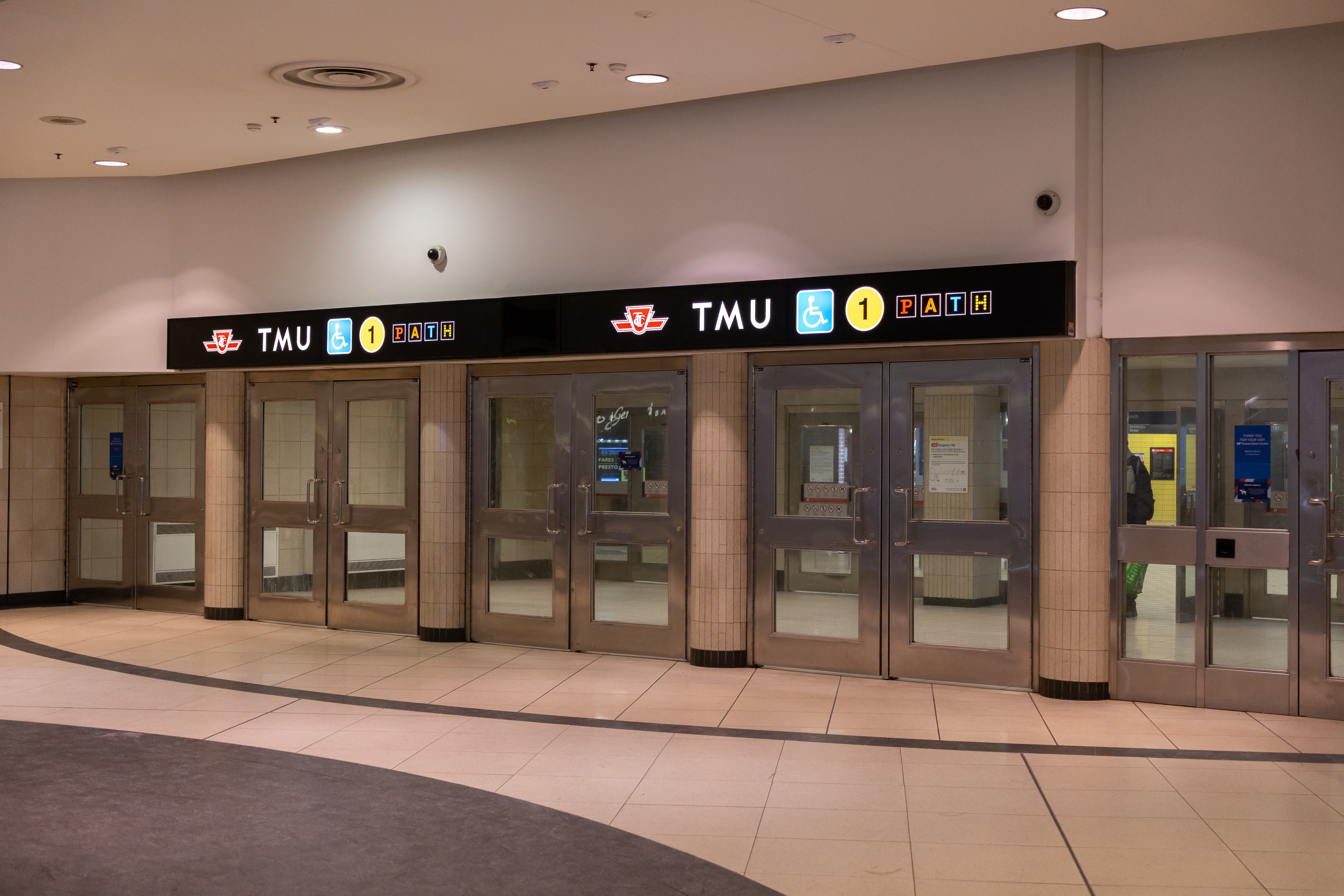
Entrance from Toronto Eaton Centre

The station is located under Yonge Street at Dundas Street and is built on three levels, with entrances on every corner of the intersection. and all being accessible except for the northwest one, which is a sidewalk staircase at the Atrium on Bay building. The southeast, southwest, and northeast entrances are located at Sankofa Square, in the Toronto Eaton Centre and at the Tenor inside the Cineplex Cinemas building respectively. All elevators that connect the entrance to the station are not provided by the TTC, but by the respective managements.

TMU is the only station in Toronto where the northbound and southbound platforms are in separate fare-paid areas, owing to the constrained space and difficult geology at this location. Separate street entrances had to be used for each direction until the Eaton Centre was built, at which time a tunnel was constructed under the tracks outside the fare-paid areas, which is considered the third level. If on the wrong platform, passengers (including Presto card holders) can take a transfer from the transfer machines available on the platform, exit the station, and re-enter the station on the other platform by showing the collector at the booth the transfer obtained.

The station has underground connections to the Toronto Eaton Centre, the Tenor and the Atrium on Bay, and is one of five stations connected to PATH.

== Architecture and art ==
The station features William McElcheran's Cross Section, located by the northwest entrance and along the under-platform crosswalk. It depicts a vibrant urban scene of pets, shoppers, businessmen and other commuters. The piece was created out of terra cotta and fired in two-foot-square tiles. The artwork was donated by Atrium on Bay in May 1984.

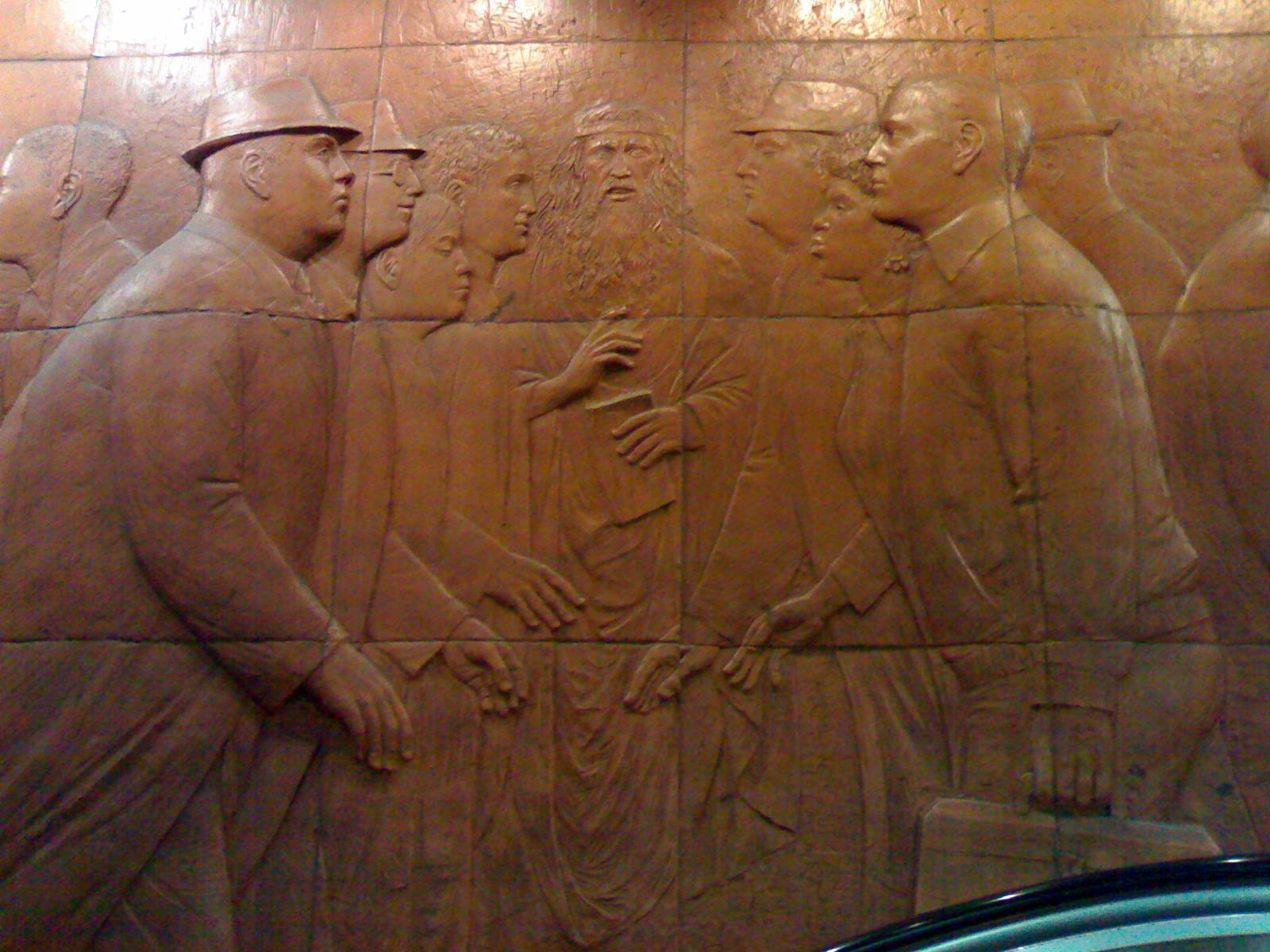
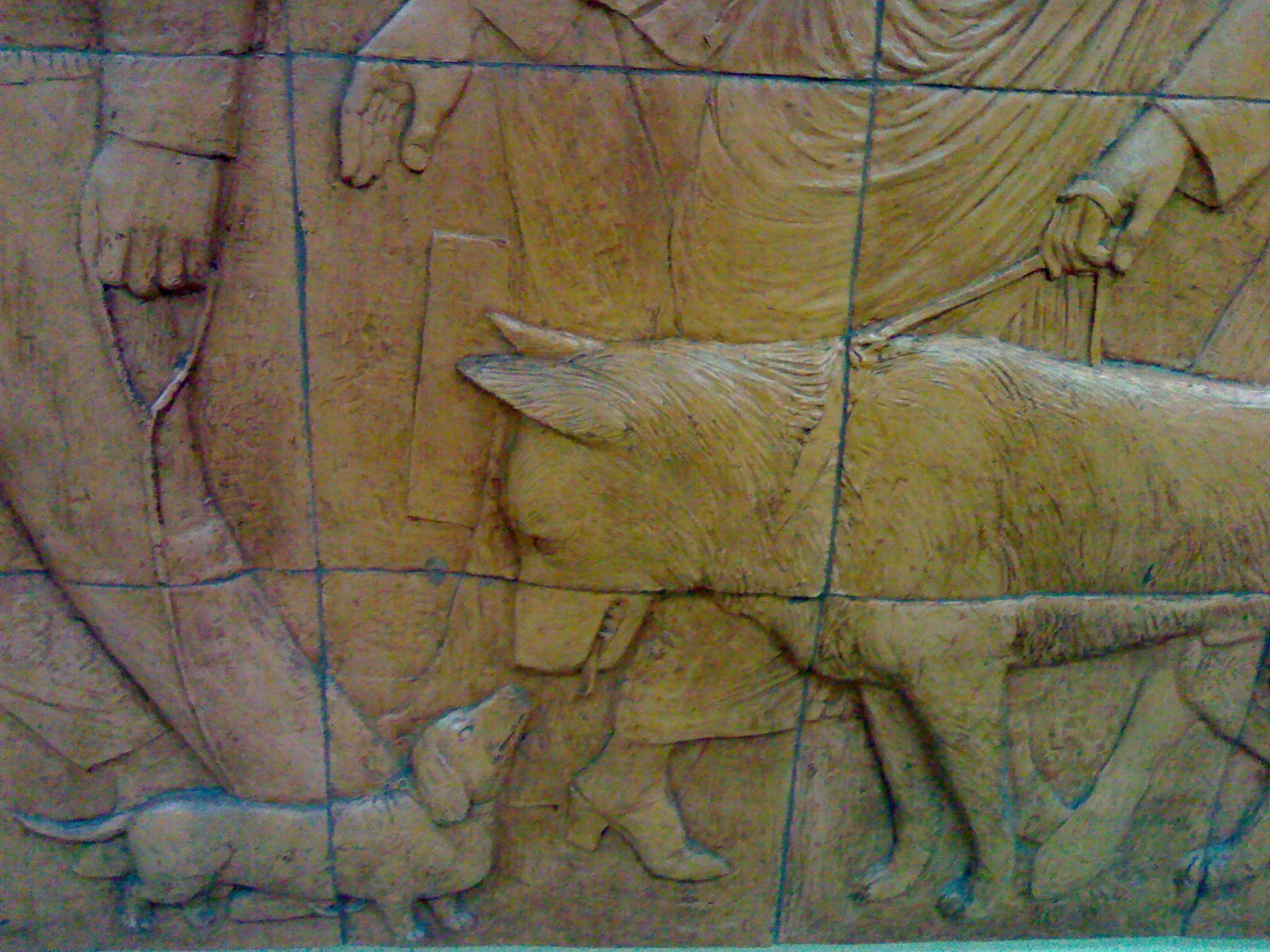
Two sections of William McElcheran's mural Cross Section, showing people and dogs

== Subway infrastructure in the vicinity ==
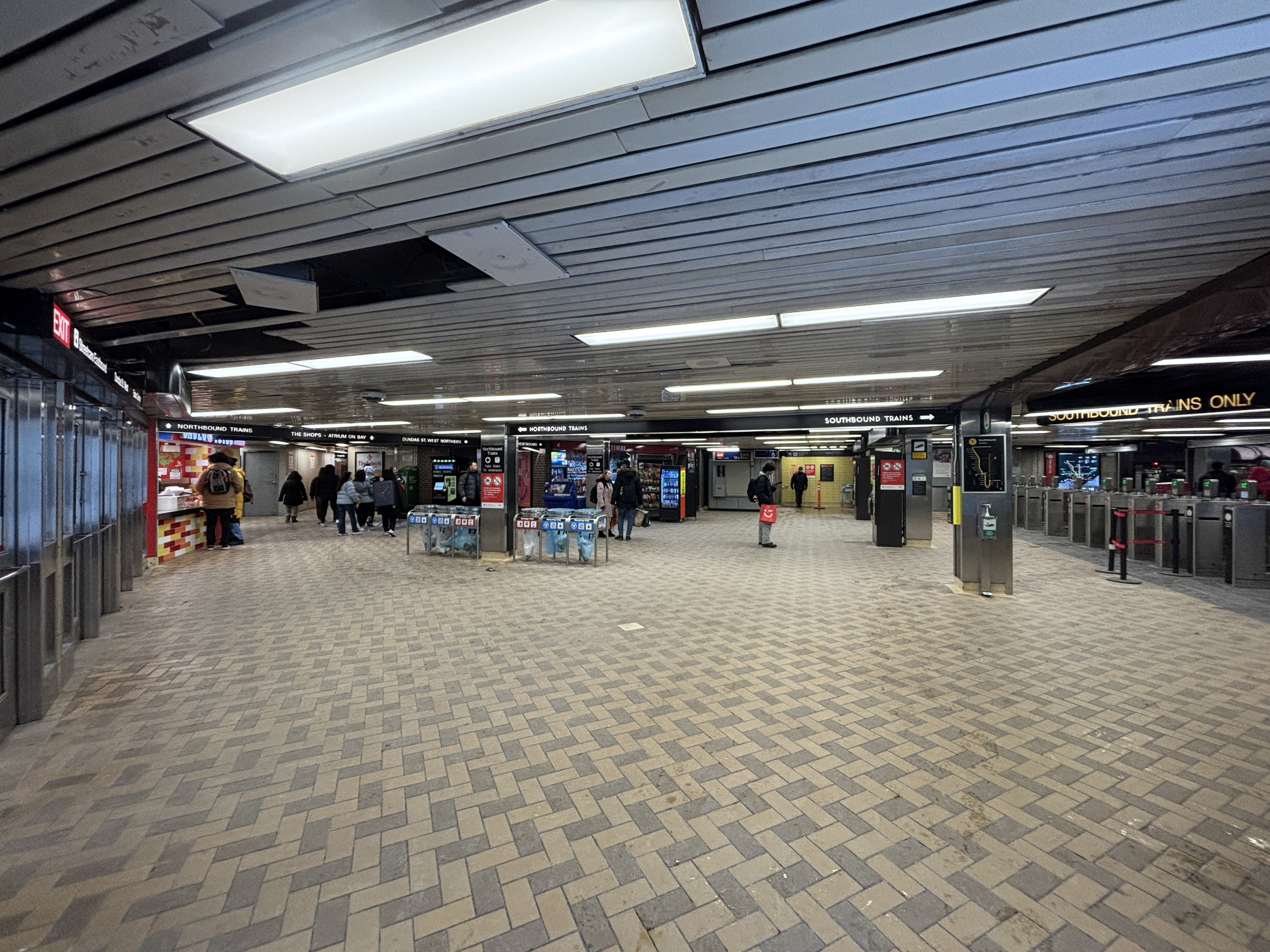
Concourse

North of the station, the subway continues to travel through its tunnels underneath Yonge Street, passing over a double crossover, before entering College station. South of the station, it continues underneath Yonge Street, over Lower Queen station, before fully entering Queen station.

== Nearby landmarks ==
Nearby landmarks include Sankofa Square, the north end of the Eaton Centre, the former Toronto Coach Terminal, Toronto City Hall, the Ed Mirvish Theatre, and The Tenor shopping centre. Buildings on the campus of Toronto Metropolitan University surround the station to the west, north and east. Nearby public art galleries include the Image Centre and Gallery Arcturus.

== Surface connections ==
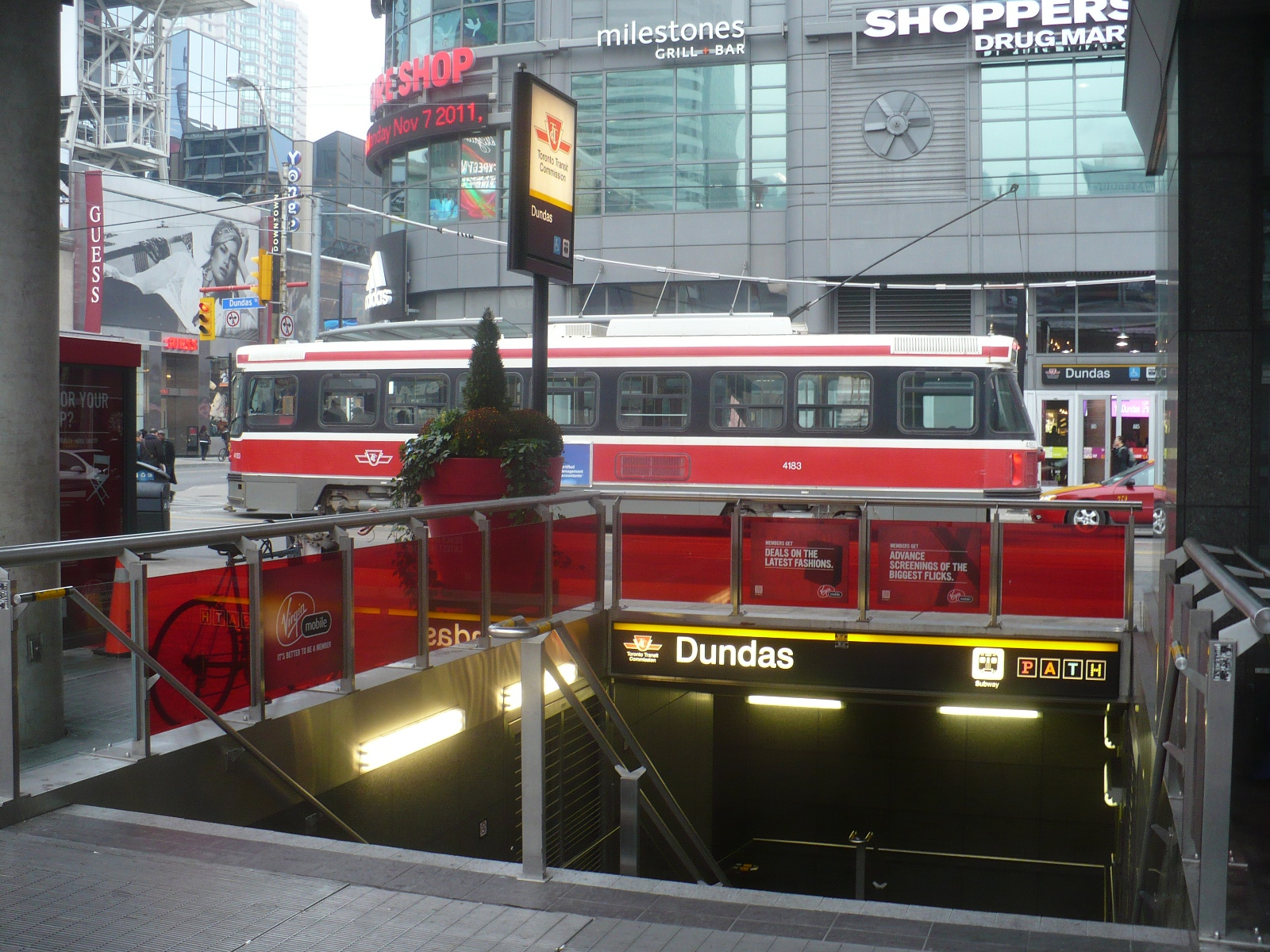
A 505 Dundas streetcar by the station entrance (with the Dundas name)

A 505 Dundas streetcar by the station entrance (with the TMU name)

A transfer is required to connect between the subway system and these surface routes:

TTC routes serving the station include:

Route	Name	Additional information
97C	Yonge	Northbound to Eglinton station and southbound to Union station (Rush hour service)
305	Dundas	Streetcar; Blue Night service; eastbound to Broadview station and westbound to Dundas West station
320	Yonge	Blue Night service; northbound to Steeles Avenue and southbound to Queens Quay
505	Dundas	Streetcar; eastbound to Broadview station and westbound to Dundas West station
