= Last Alarm (sculpture) =

Artwork and memorial in Toronto, Canada

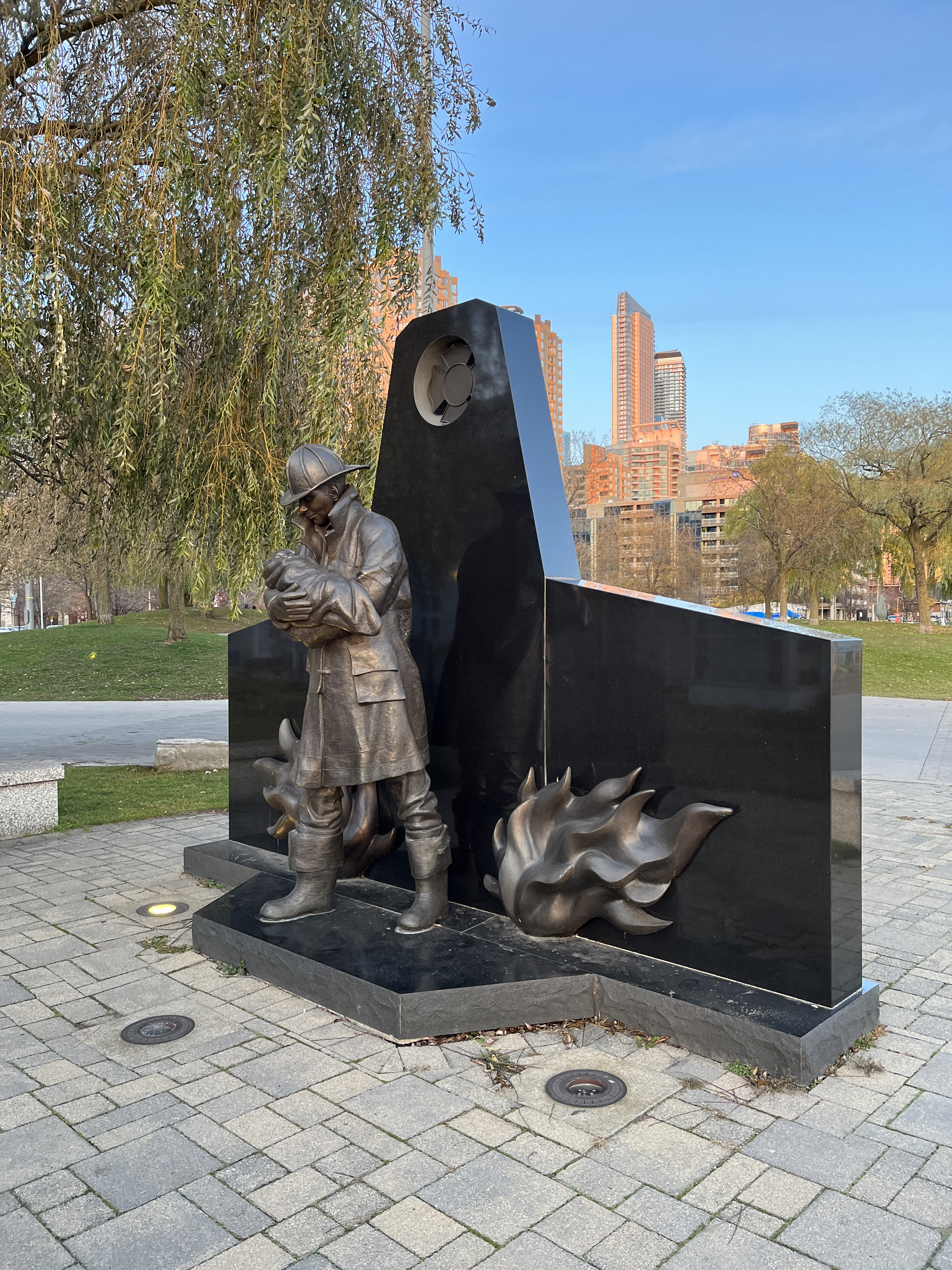
- The memorial in 2023
- Location: Toronto, Ontario, Canada; 43°38′15.2″N 79°23′18.1″W

Last Alarm is a memorial sculpture outside Toronto Fire and Marine Station 334, in Ontario, Canada. It honours firefighters who died in the line of duty in Toronto. It features the Memorial Honour Roll, which includes the names of all of Toronto's fallen firefighters, where a ceremony is held annually.
