= Be Welcoming =

Interactive sculpture

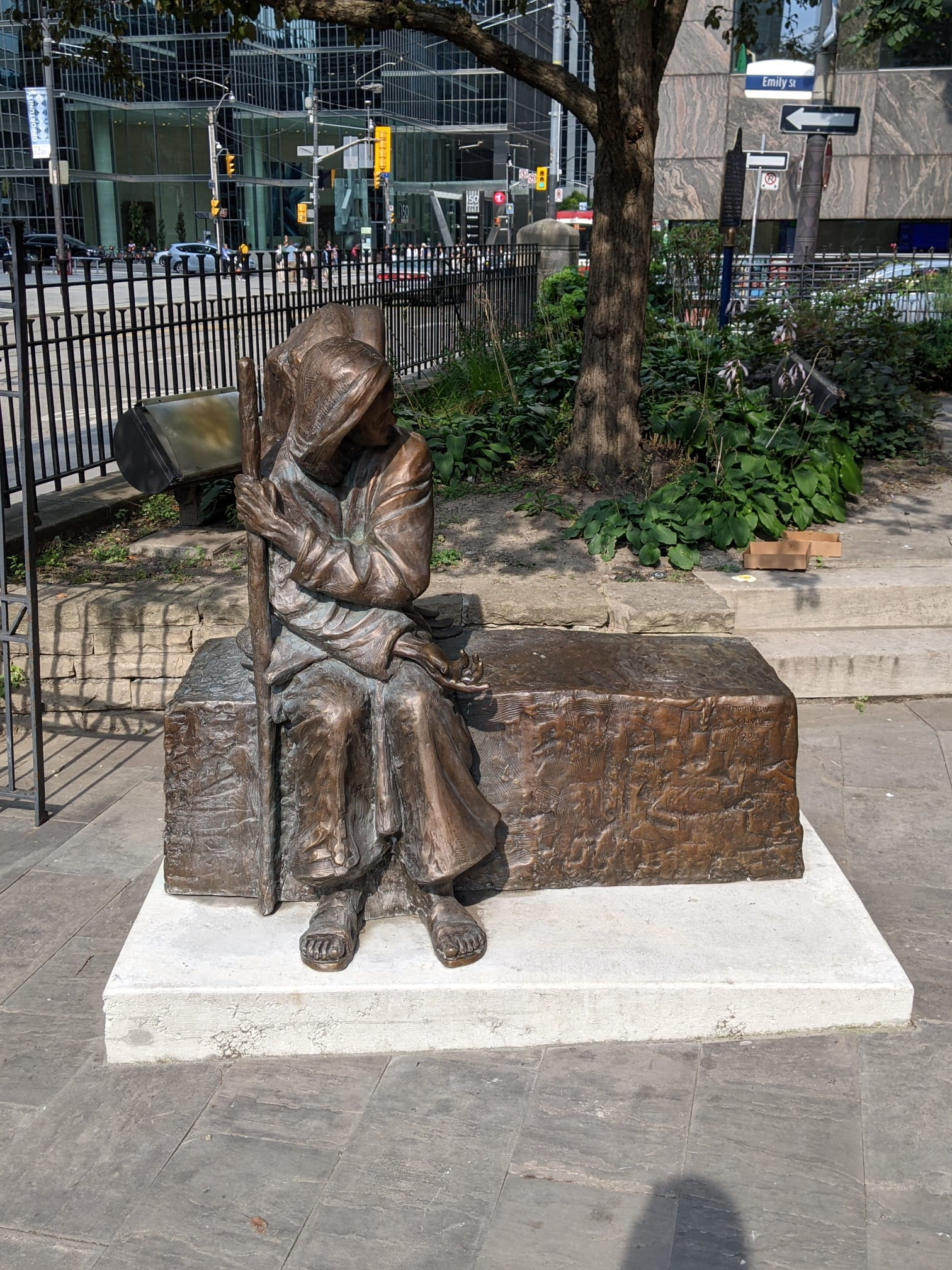
- Artist: Timothy Schmalz
- Year: 2019
- Medium: Bronze
- Dimensions: 1.5 m × 0.92 m × 1.32 m (59 in × 36 in × 52 in)
- Website: bewelcoming.com

Be Welcoming is a bronze sculpture by Canadian artist Timothy Schmalz. It was created in 2019, inspired by the same scripture text that is at the center of Schmalz’s “Angels Unawares” monument in St. Peter’s Square, Hebrews 13:2 “Be welcoming to strangers, many have entertained angels unawares.”

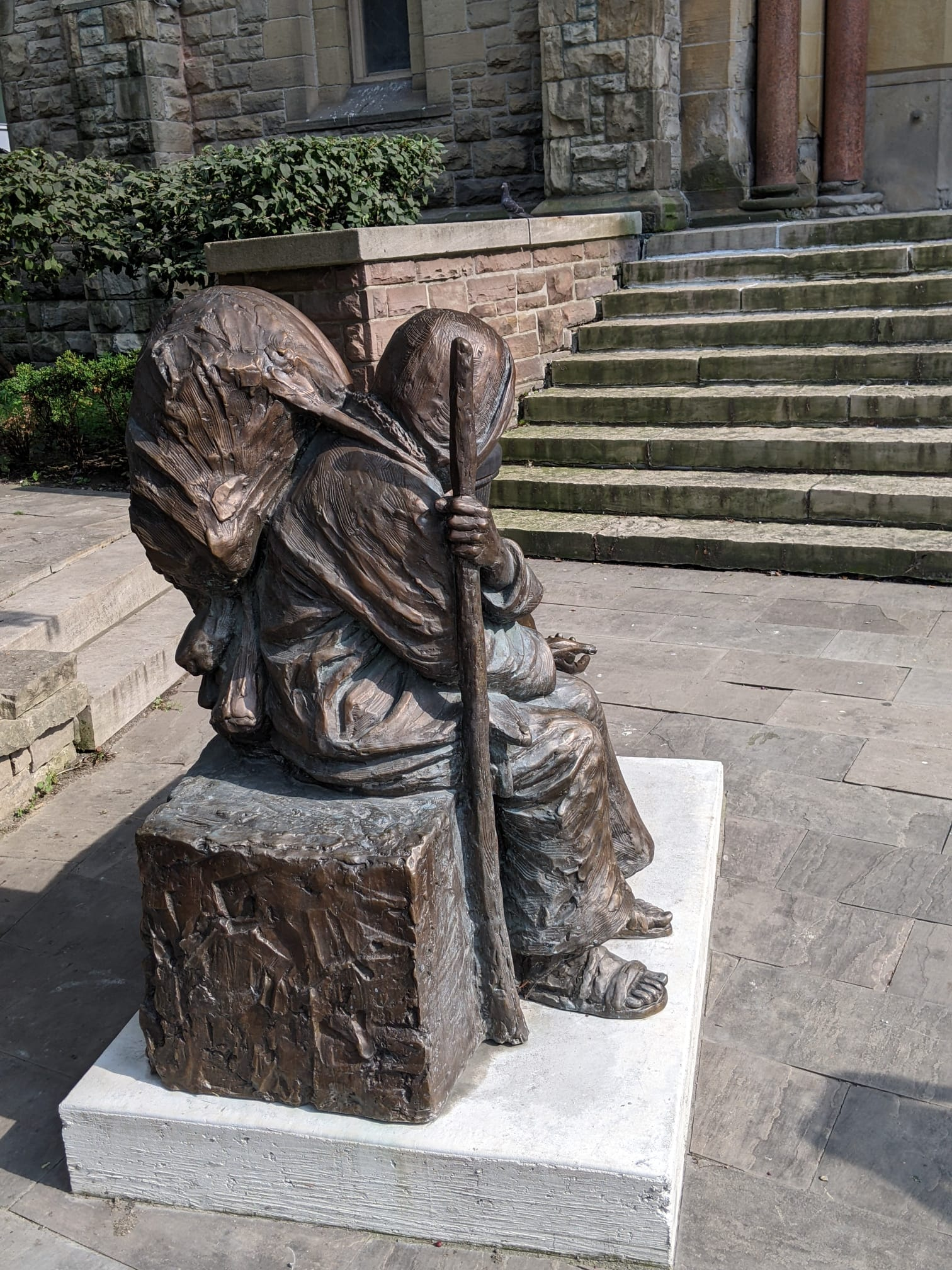
Be Welcoming by Timothy Schmalz, Pilgrim side

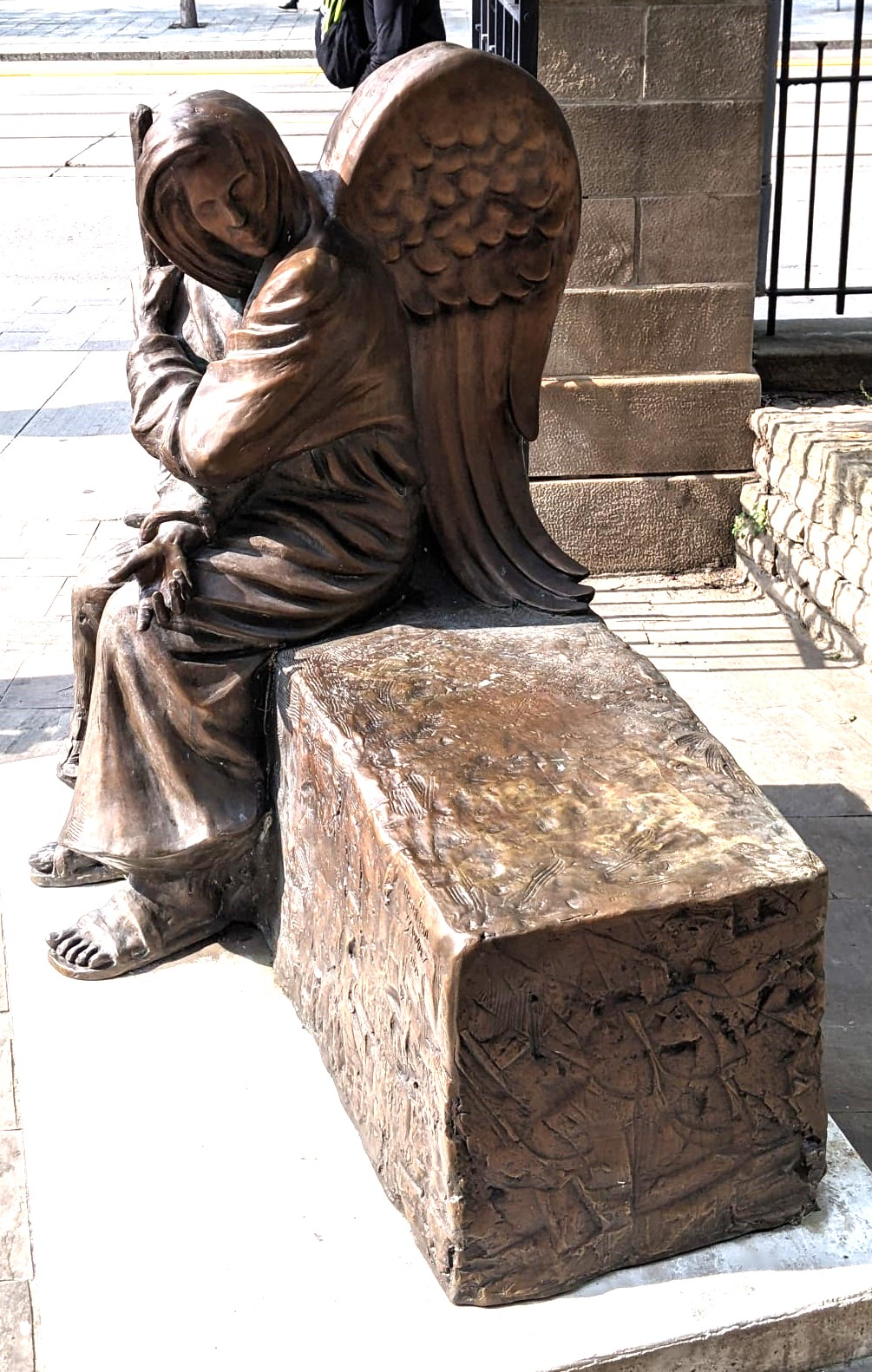
Be Welcoming by Timothy Schmalz, Angel side

Be Welcoming is an interactive sculpture. The sculpture at first glance depicts a hooded figure, appearing to be a stranger, a traveler or a pilgrim. However, as the viewer walks around the sculpture and changes perspective, the figure is shown to be an angel with an outstretched hand motioning as if to invite the viewer to sit beside them. The full sculpture includes the life-sized pilgrim-angel sculpture with a bronze bench large enough for an adult to sit upon.

The sculpture has been placed along the paths associated with Christian pilgrimages such as El Camino de Santiago in Spain and the St. Padre Pio Shrine in Southern Italy. Replicas of this piece are also installed in Chicago, Des Moines, Toronto, and Quebec City.

On April 15, 2025, Be Welcoming was installed near the Showers for the Poor and the Mother of Mercy Clinic in the colonnade of St. Peter’s Square. Be Welcoming is the third Schmalz installation located in the vicinity of St. Peter’s Basilica. The artist’s “Homeless Jesus” statue, inaugurated in March 2016 during the Extraordinary Jubilee of Mercy, is located in the square in front of the Vatican’s apostolic charity offices.
