= San Pietro in Vincoli =

Church in Rome

Basilica of Saint Peter in Chains
- San Pietro in Vincoli al Colle Oppio (Italian); S. Petri ad vincula (Latin)
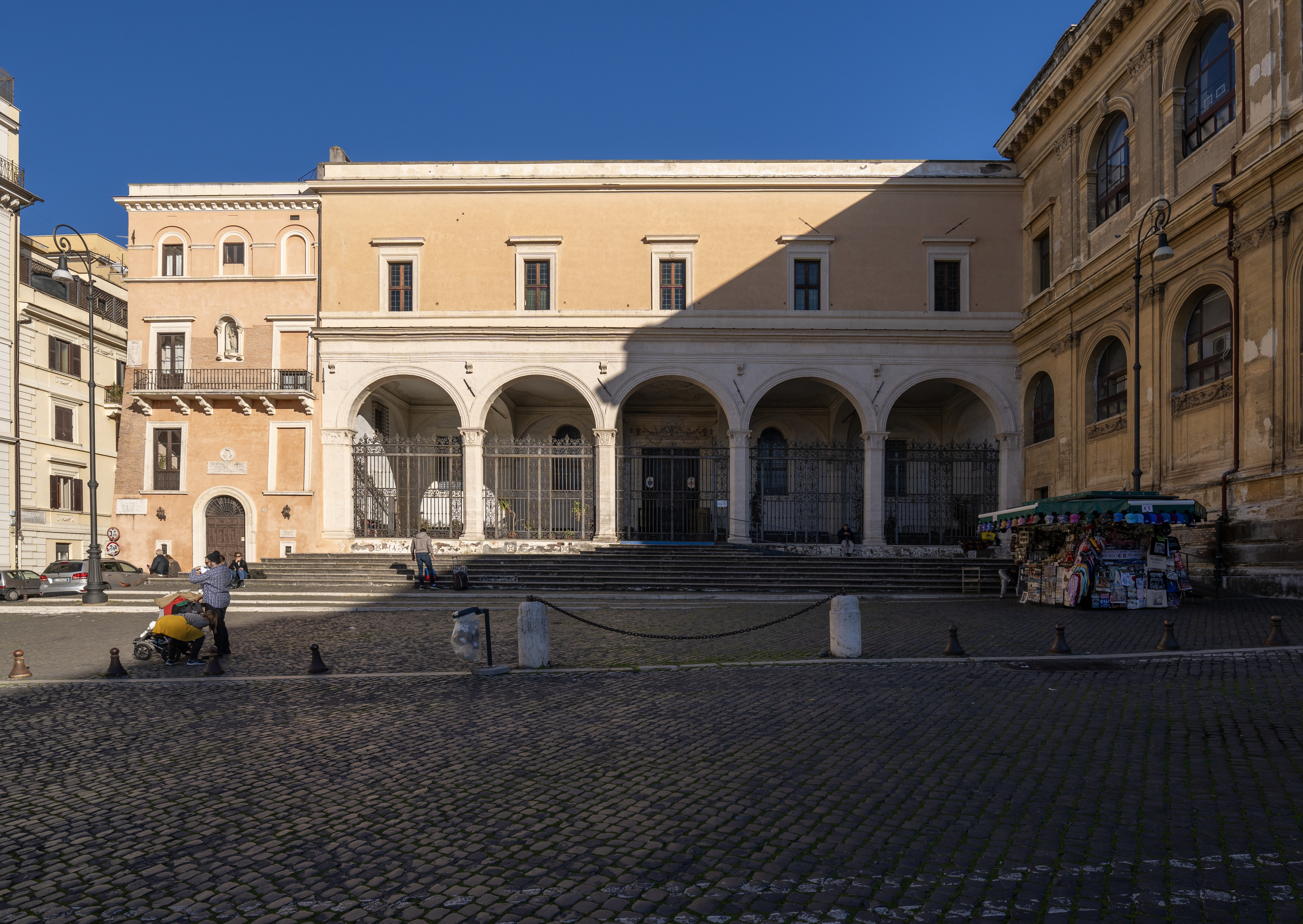
- Façade of the Basilica
- Click on the map for a fullscreen view
- 41°53′38″N 12°29′35″E
- Location: Piazza di San Pietro in Vincoli 4a, Rome, Italy
- Country: Italy
- Denomination: Catholic
- Tradition: Roman Rite
- Website: Official website

History
- Status: Titular church, minor basilica
- Dedication: Saint Peter
- Consecrated: 439 CE

Architecture
- Architect: Giuliano da Sangallo
- Architectural type: Renaissance, Baroque
- Groundbreaking: 5th century

Specifications
- Length: 70 metres (230 ft)
- Width: 40 metres (130 ft)

San Pietro in Vincoli ([sam ˈpjɛːtro iɱ ˈviŋkoli]; Saint Peter in Chains) is a Roman Catholic titular church and minor basilica in Rome, Italy. The church is on the Oppian Hill near Cavour metro station, a short distance from the Colosseum. The name alludes to the Biblical story of the Liberation of Peter.

This church is best known for housing Michelangelo's statue of Moses, part of the tomb of Pope Julius II.

Following the death of Pio Laghi, Donald Wuerl became the Cardinal-Priest in 2010.

Housed in the adjacent building, formerly a convent associated with the church, is the Faculty of Engineering of La Sapienza University. Confusingly, this academic institution also carries the epithet "San Pietro in Vincoli".

== History ==
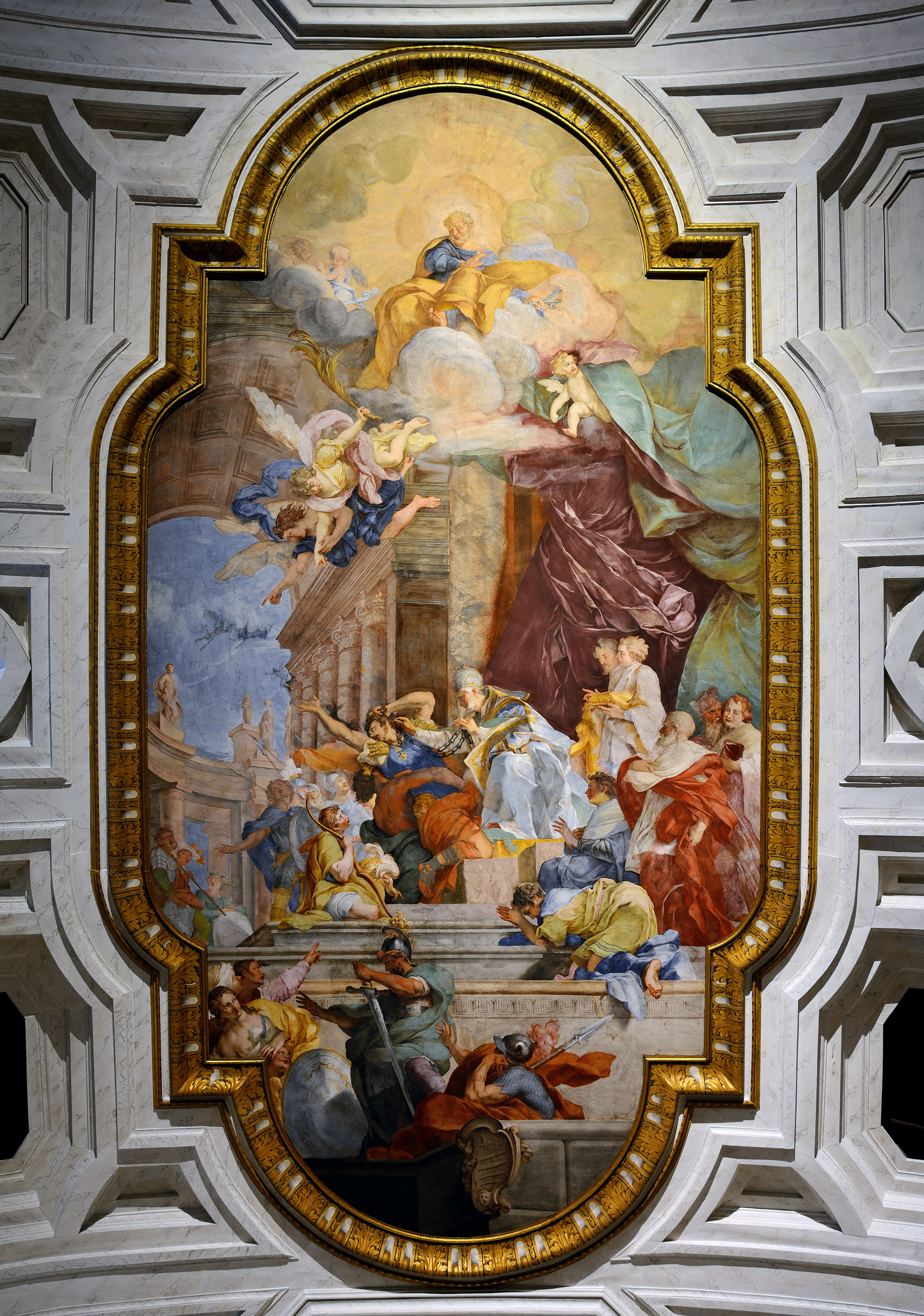
The Miracle of the Chains ceiling fresco by Giovanni Battista Parodi (1706).

Also known as the Basilica Eudoxiana (Italian: Basilica Eudossiana, it was first rebuilt on older foundations in 432–440 to house the relic of the chains that bound Saint Peter when he was imprisoned in Jerusalem, the episode called "Liberation of Saint Peter". The Empress Eudoxia (wife of Emperor Valentinian III), who received them as a gift from her mother, Aelia Eudocia, presented the chains to Pope Leo I. It was probably during a pilgrimage in 438-439 that Aelia Eudocia had received the chains as a gift from Juvenal, bishop of Jerusalem.

The chain is now kept in a reliquary under the main altar in the basilica. Since 1894, a link of the chain has been housed in St Peter's Church, Rutland, Vermont. Around the world, numerous churches to St Peter bear the Ad Vincula suffix, relating to the basilica and relic.

Of interest in this context are St Peter's two imprisonments. According to legend, when Leo compared the Jerusalem chain to that of St Peter's final imprisonment in the Mamertine Prison, in Rome, the two chains miraculously fused together.

The basilica, consecrated in 439 by Sixtus III, has undergone several reconstructions, among them a restoration by Pope Adrian I, and further work in the eleventh century. From 1471 to 1503, when he was elected Pope Julius II, Cardinal Della Rovere, the nephew of Pope Sixtus IV, achieved notable rebuilding. The front portico, attributed to Baccio Pontelli, was added in 1475. The cloister (1493–1503) has been attributed to Giuliano da Sangallo. The vault was lowered in 1705 under the architect Francesco Fontana, and there was another renovation in 1875.

== Interior ==
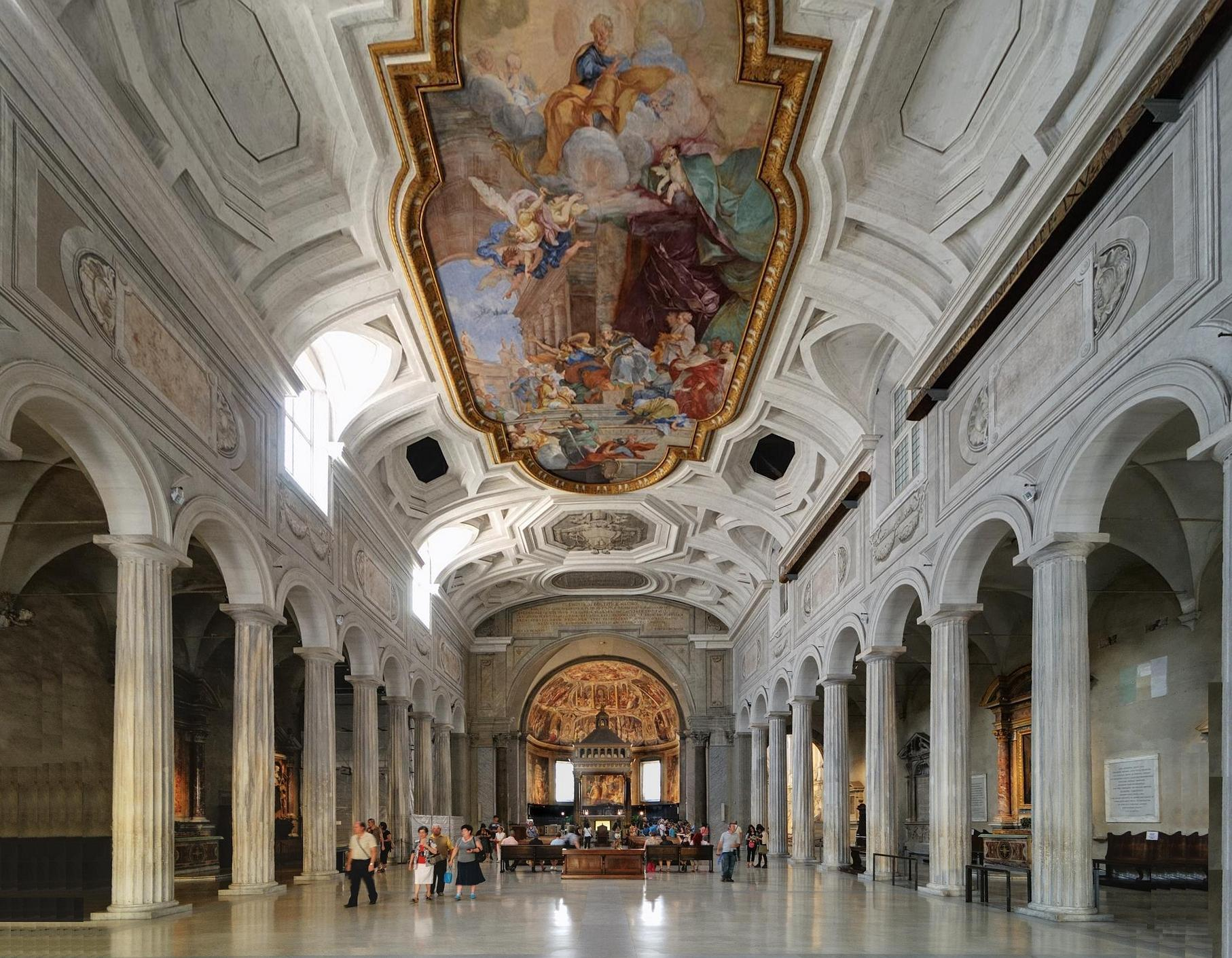
Interior of the basilica

The interior has a nave and two aisles, with three apses divided by antique Doric columns. The aisles are surmounted by cross-vaults, while the nave has an 18th-century coffered ceiling, frescoed in the centre by Giovanni Battista Parodi, portraying the Miracle of the Chains (1706). In this scene, based purely on a fable, Pope Alexander heals the neck goiter of the mythical Saint Balbina by touching her with the chains that had once bound St Peter.

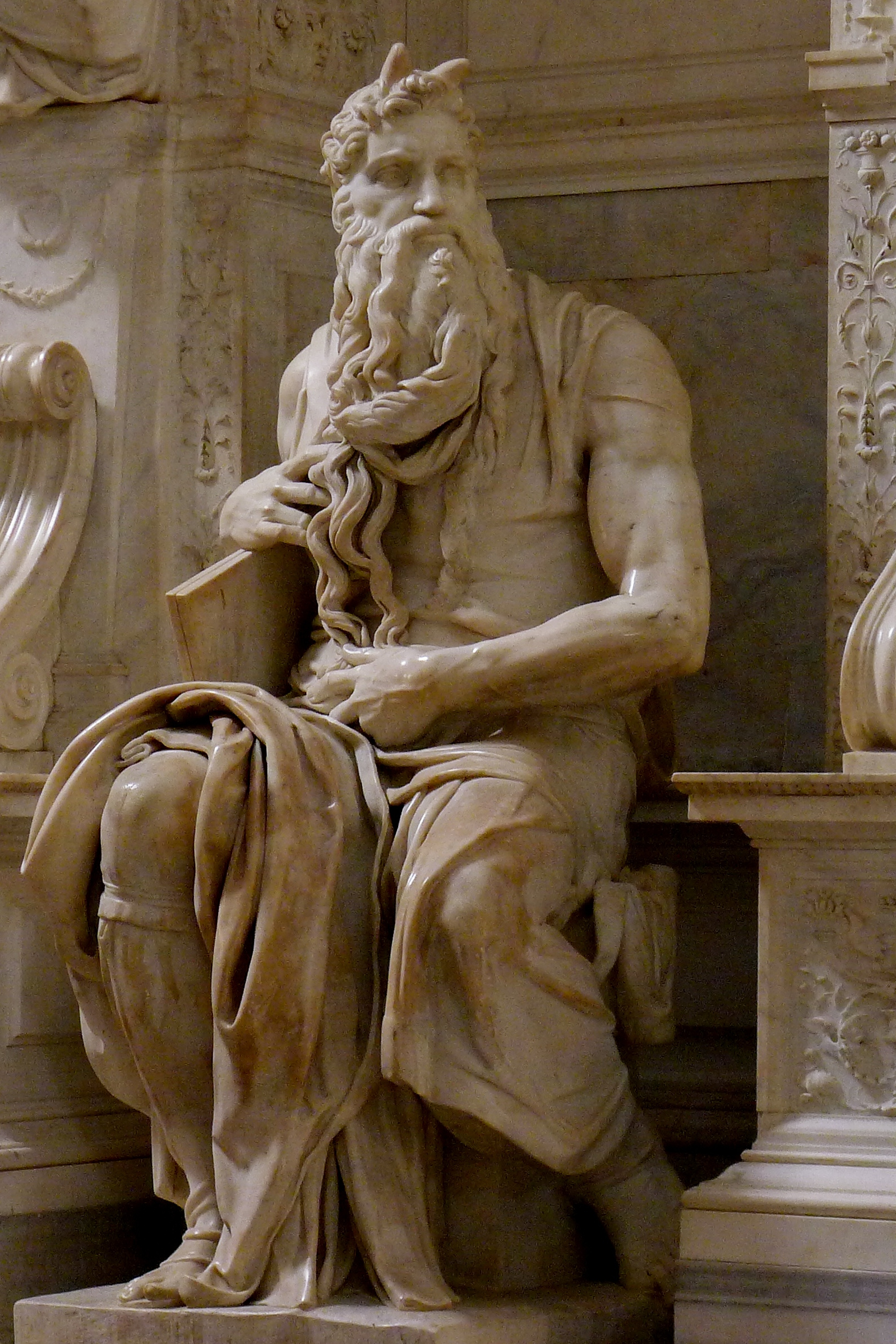
Michelangelo's Moses statue

Michelangelo's Moses (completed in 1515), while originally intended as part of a massive 47-statue, free-standing funeral monument for Pope Julius II, became the centerpiece of the Pope's funeral monument and tomb in this, the church of della Rovere family. Moses is depicted with horns, connoting "the radiance of the Lord", due to the similarity in the Hebrew words for "beams of light" and "horns". This kind of iconographic symbolism was common in early sacred art, and for an artist horns are easier to sculpt than rays of light.

Other works of art include two canvases of Saint Augustine and St Margaret by Guercino, the monument of Cardinal Girolamo Agucchi designed by Domenichino, who is also the painter of a sacristy fresco depicting the Liberation of St Peter (1604). The altarpiece on the first chapel to the left is a Deposition by Cristoforo Roncalli. The tomb of Cardinal Nicholas of Kues (d 1464), with its relief, Cardinal Nicholas before St Peter, is by Andrea Bregno. Painter and sculptor Antonio del Pollaiuolo is buried at the left side of the entrance. He is the Florentine sculptor who added the figures of Romulus and Remus to the sculpture of the Capitoline Wolf on the Capitol. Inside a portico at the entrance is the original sculpture When I was Naked, created by Canadian artist Timothy Schmalz as part of the Matthew 25 collection installed throughout Rome on the occasion of the Extraordinary Jubilee of Mercy.

The tomb monument of Cardinal Cinzio Aldobrandini was erected 1705–07 by prince Giovanni Battista Pamphili Aldobrandini to a design by his architect Carlo Francesco Bizzaccheri and with the sculptures of putti and a winged skeleton by Pierre Le Gros the Younger.

In 1876 archeologists discovered the tombs of those once believed to be the seven Maccabean martyrs depicted in 2 Maccabees 7–41. They are remembered each year on 1 August, the same day as the miracle of the fusing of the two chains.

The third altar in the left aisle holds a mosaic of Saint Sebastian from the seventh century. This mosaic is related to an outbreak of plague in Pavia, in northern Italy. The relics of Sebastian were taken there in order to stop a 680 outbreak of plague, since Sebastian was believed to have been born in Lombardy, and an altar was constructed for his relics at a San Pietro in Vincoli in Pavia. As a symbol of the subsequently reinforced relationship between Pavia and Rome, an identical altar to Sebastian was built at the Roman church of the same name, resulting in a parallel cult for the saint in both regions.

== List of Cardinal-Priests since 1405 ==
List of the cardinals titular of the church

...

- Deusdedit (c. 1078 – c. 1098)
- Albericus (attested 1100)
- Benedictus (c. 1102 – c. 1127)
- Matthaeus (c. 1127 – c. 1137)
- Comes (1138 – 1139)
- Guillelmus of Pavia (1158 – 1176)

...

- Antonio Arcioni (12 June 1405 – 21 July 1405)
- Antonio Correr (9 May 1408 – 9 May 1409)
- João Afonso Esteves da Azambuja (6 June 1411 – 23 January 1415)
- Juan de Cervantes (27 May 1426 – 27 March 1447)
- Nicholas of Cusa (3 January 1449 – 12 August 1464)
- Francesco della Rovere (20 November 1467 – 10 August 1471)
- Giuliano della Rovere (22 December 1471 – 1 November 1503)
- Galeotto Franciotti della Rovere (6 December 1503 – 11 September 1507)
- Sisto Gara della Rovere (11 September 1507 – 8 March 1517)
- Leonardo Grosso della Rovere (9 March 1517 – 17 September 1520)
- Silvio Passerini (17 September 1520 – 5 January 1521)
- Albrecht von Brandenburg (5 January 1521 – 24 September 1545)
- Jacopo Sadoleto (27 November 1545 – 18 October 1547)
- Jean du Bellay (26 October 1547 – 9 April 1548)
- Giulio della Rovere (9 April 1548 – 12 April 1570)
- Antoine Perrenot de Granvella (9 June 1570 – 9 July 1578)
- Giovanni Antonio Serbelloni (12 April 1570 – 9 June 1570)
- Markus Sitticus von Hohenems Altemps (3 October 1578 – 17 August 1579)
- Stanislaus Hosius (9 July 1578 – 3 October 1578)
- Alfonso Gesualdo (17 August 1579 – 5 December 1580)
- Marco Antonio Colonna (5 December 1580 – 13 October 1586)
- Girolamo della Rovere (14 January 1587 – 7 February 1592)
- Alessandro Ottaviano de' Medici (14 February 1592 – 21 February 1600)
- François de Joyeuse (27 April 1594 – 24 March 1604)
- Girolamo Agucchi (25 June 1604 – 27 April 1605)
- Cinzio Passeri Aldobrandini (1 June 1605 – 1 January 1610)
- Lanfranco Margotti (11 January 1610 – 28 February 1611)
- Bartolomeo Cesi (5 December 1611 – 7 January 1613)
- Bonifazio Bevilacqua Aldobrandini (7 January 1613 – 29 March 1621)
- Michelangelo Tonti (13 October 1621 – 21 April 1622)
- François d'Escoubleau de Sourdis (29 March 1621 – 13 October 1621)
- Luigi Capponi (2 May 1622 – 20 August 1629)
- Laudivio Zacchia (17 September 1629 – 30 August 1637)
- Antonio Barberini (7 September 1637 – 26 May 1642)
- Bernardino Spada (22 May 1642 – 19 February 1646)
- Marzio Ginetti (19 February 1646 – 23 September 1652)
- Giovanni Battista Maria Pallotta (23 September 1652 – 21 April 1659)
- Ulderico Carpegna (21 April 1659 – 21 November 1661)
- Alderano Cybo (21 November 1661 – 24 May 1676)
- Emmanuel Théodose de la Tour d'Auvergne de Bouillon (19 October 1676 – 19 October 1689)
- Savo Millini (12 December 1689 – 10 February 1701)
- Pierre de Bonzi (19 October 1689 – 28 November 1689)
- Marcello Durazzo (21 February 1701 – 27 April 1710)
- Fulvio Astalli (7 May 1710 – 16 April 1714)
- Ferdinando d'Adda (16 April 1714 – 21 January 1715)
- Lorenzo Casoni (21 January 1715 – 19 November 1720)
- Lorenzo Corsini (16 December 1720 – 19 November 1725)
- Gianantonio Davia (19 November 1725 – 11 February 1737)
- Vincenzo Petra (11 February 1737 – 16 September 1740)
- Francesco Antonio Finy (16 September 1740 – 11 March 1743)
- Nicolò Maria Lercari (11 March 1743 – 21 March 1757)
- Antonio Andrea Galli (23 May 1757 – 24 March 1767)
- Gaetano Fantuzzi Gottifredi (6 April 1767 – 1 October 1778)
- Lazzaro Opizio Pallavicino (14 December 1778 – 23 February 1785)
- Giuseppe Doria Pamphili (11 April 1785 – 20 September 1802)
- Girolamo Della Porta (20 September 1802 – 5 September 1812)
- Tommaso Arezzo (29 April 1816 – 29 May 1820)
- Paolo Giuseppe Solaro (24 November 1823 – 9 September 1824)
- Joachim-Jean-Xavier d'Isoard (17 September 1827 – 15 April 1833)
- Castruccio Castracane degli Antelminelli (29 July 1833 – 22 January 1844)
- Niccola Paracciani Clarelli (25 January 1844 – 22 February 1867)
- Luis de la Lastra y Cuesta (12 July 1867 – 5 May 1876)
- Giovanni Simeoni (18 December 1876 – 14 January 1892)
- Ignatius Persico (19 January 1893 – 7 December 1895)
- Adolphe Perraud (25 June 1896 – 10 February 1906)
- Désiré-Joseph Mercier (18 April 1907 – 23 January 1926)
- Luigi Capotosti (24 June 1926 – 16 February 1938)
- Teodósio de Gouveia (22 February 1946 – 6 February 1962)
- Leo Joseph Suenens (22 March 1962 – 6 May 1996)
- Jean Marie Balland (21 February 1998 – 1 March 1998)
- Louis-Marie Billé (21 February 2001 – 22 July 2001)
- Pio Laghi (26 February 2002 – 10 January 2009)
- Donald Wuerl (20 November 2010 – present)

== Bibliography ==
- Federico Gizzi, Le chiese medievali di Roma, Newton Compton/Rome, 1998.

Preceded by San Pancrazio	Landmarks of Rome; San Pietro in Vincoli	Succeeded by Santa Prassede
