= Josephine Bakhita =

Italian saint and former slave (1869–1947)

Saint Josephine Bakhita FDCC
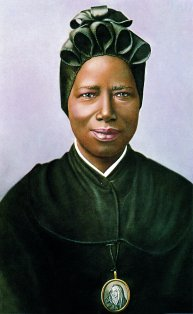

Virgin
- Born: c. 1869; Olgossa, Sultanate of Darfur
- Died: 8 February 1947 (aged 77–78); Schio, Veneto, Italy
- Venerated in: Catholic Church; Anglican Communion
- Beatified: 17 May 1992, St Peter's Basilica by Pope John Paul II
- Canonized: 1 October 2000, St Peter's Basilica by Pope John Paul II
- Feast: 8 February
- Patronage: Catholic Church in Sudan, Sudan, South Sudan

Josephine Margaret Bakhita, FDCC (Arabic: جوزفين بخيتة; c. 1869 – 8 February 1947) was a Sudanese religious sister who joined the Canossians in 1896 after winning her freedom from slavery. She served in Italy for 50 years until her death in 1947. She was canonized in 2000, becoming the first female black saint in the modern era.

== Biography ==
=== Early life ===
She was born around 1869 in Darfur (now in western Sudan) in the village of Olgossa, west of Nyala and close to Mount Agilerei. She was one of the Daju people; her respected and reasonably prosperous father was brother of the village chief. She was surrounded by a loving family of three brothers and three sisters; as she says in her autobiography: "I lived a very happy and carefree life, without knowing what suffering was".

=== Enslavement ===
In 1877, when she was 7–8 years old, she was seized by Arab slave traders, who had abducted her elder sister two years earlier. She was forced to walk barefoot about 960 kilometres (600 mi) to El Obeid and was sold and bought twice before she arrived there. Over the course of twelve years (1877–1889), she was sold three more times.

'Bakhita' was not the name she received from her parents at birth. It is said that the trauma of her abduction caused her to forget her original name; she took one given to her by the slavers, bakhīta (بخيتة), Arabic for 'lucky' or 'fortunate'. She was also forcibly converted to Islam.

In El Obeid, Bakhita was bought by a rich Arab who used her as a maid for his two daughters. They treated her relatively well, until after offending one of her owner's sons, wherein the son lashed and kicked her so severely that she spent more than a month unable to move from her straw bed. Her fourth owner was a Turkish general, and she had to serve his mother-in-law and his wife, who were cruel to their slaves. Bakhita said: "During all the years I stayed in that house, I do not recall a day that passed without some wound or other. When a wound from the whip began to heal, other blows would pour down on me."

She once said that the most terrifying of all of her memories there was when she (along with other slaves) was marked by a process resembling both scarification and tattooing, which was a traditional practice throughout Sudan. As her mistress was watching her with a whip in her hand, a dish of white flour, a dish of salt and a razor were brought by a woman. She used the flour to draw patterns on her skin, and then she cut deeply along the lines before filling the wounds with salt to ensure permanent scarring. A total of 114 intricate patterns were cut into her breasts, stomach and into her right arm.

By the end of 1882, El Obeid came under the threat of an attack by Mahdist revolutionaries. The Turkish general began making preparations to return to his homeland and sold his slaves. In 1883, Bakhita was bought in Khartoum by the Italian Vice Consul Callisto Legnani, who did not beat or punish her. Two years later, when Legnani himself had to return to Italy, Bakhita begged to go with him. At the end of 1884, they escaped from a besieged Khartoum with a friend, Augusto Michieli. They travelled a risky 650-kilometre (400 mi) trip on camelback to Suakin, which was the largest port of Sudan. In March 1885, they left Suakin for Italy and arrived at the port of Genoa in April. They were met there by Augusto Michieli's wife, Maria Turina Michieli, to whom Legnani gave ownership of Bakhita. Her new owners took her to their family villa at Zianigo, near Mirano, Veneto, about 25 km (16 mi) west of Venice. She lived there for three years and became nanny to the Michieli daughter Alice (Mimmina), born in February 1886. The Michielis brought Bakhita with them back to the Sudan, where they stayed for nine months before returning to Italy.

=== Conversion to Catholicism and freedom ===
Suakin on the Red Sea was besieged but remained in Anglo-Egyptian hands. Augusto Michieli acquired a large hotel there and decided to sell his property in Italy and to move his family to Sudan permanently. Selling his house and lands took longer than expected. By the end of 1888, Turina Michieli wanted to see her husband in Sudan even though land transactions were unfinished. Since the villa in Zianigo was already sold, Bakhita and Mimmina needed a temporary place to stay while Michieli went to Sudan without them. On the advice of their business agent Illuminato Cecchini, on 29 November 1888, Michieli left both in the care of the Canossians in Venice. There, cared for and instructed by the sisters, Bakhita encountered Christianity for the first time. Grateful to her teachers, she recalled, "Those holy mothers instructed me with heroic patience and introduced me to that God who from childhood I had felt in my heart without knowing who He was."

When Turina Michieli returned to take her daughter and maid back to Suakin, Bakhita firmly refused to leave. For three days, Michieli tried to force the issue, finally appealing to the attorney general of the King of Italy; while the superior of the Institute for baptismal candidates (catechumenate) that Bakhita attended contacted the Patriarch of Venice about her protégée's problem. On 29 November 1889, an Italian court ruled that because the British had outlawed slavery in Sudan before Bakhita's birth and because Italian law had never recognized slavery as legal, Bakhita had never legally been a slave. For the first time in her life, Bakhita found herself in control of her own destiny, and she chose to remain with the Canossians. On 9 January 1890, Bakhita was baptised with the name Josephine Margaret Fortunata (the Latin translation of the Arabic Bakhita). On the same day, she was also confirmed and received Holy Communion from Archbishop Giuseppe Sarto, the Cardinal Patriarch of Venice and later Pope Pius X.

=== Canossian sister ===
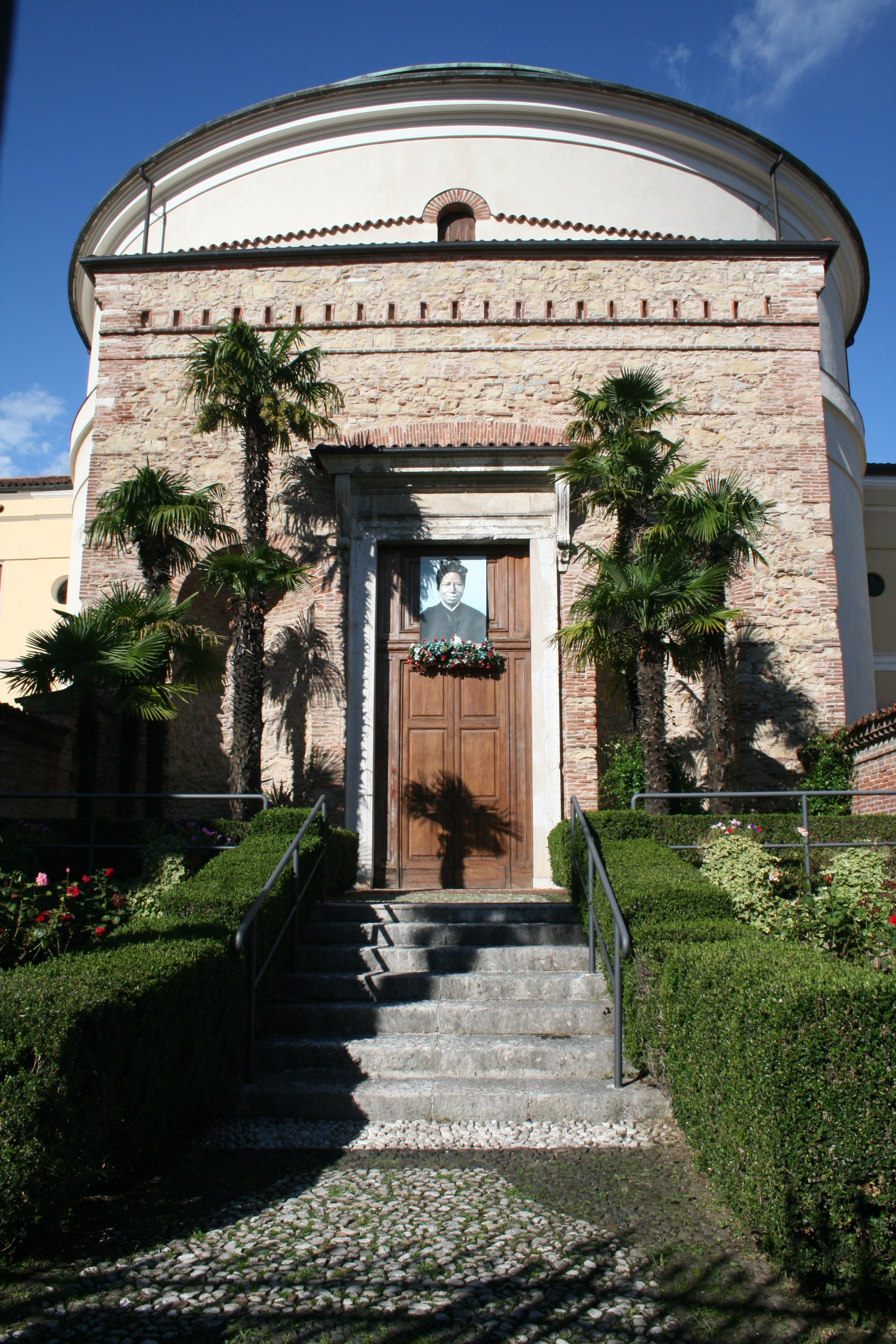
Church of the Holy Family, Schio

On 7 December 1893, Josephine Bakhita entered the novitiate of the Canossians and on 8 December 1896, she took her vows, welcomed by Cardinal Sarto. In 1902 she was assigned to the Canossian convent at Schio, in the northern Italian province of Vicenza, where she spent the rest of her life. Her only extended time away was between 1935 and 1939, when she stayed at the Missionary Novitiate in Vimercate (near Milan); mostly visiting other Canossian communities in Italy, talking about her experiences and helping to prepare young sisters for work in Africa. A strong missionary drive animated her throughout her entire life – "her mind was always on God, and her heart in Africa".

During her 42 years in Schio, Bakhita was employed as the cook, sacristan, and portress (doorkeeper) and was in frequent contact with the local community. Her gentleness, calming voice, and the ever-present smile became well known, and Vicenzans still refer to her as Sor Moretta ("little brown sister") or Madre Moretta ("black mother"). Her special charisma and reputation for sanctity were noticed by her order; the first publication of her story (Storia Meravigliosa by Ida Zanolini) in 1931 made her famous throughout Italy. During the Second World War (1939–1945) she shared the fears and hopes of the townspeople, who considered her a saint and felt protected by her presence. Bombs did not spare Schio, but the war passed without a single casualty.

Her last years were marked by pain and sickness. She used a wheelchair, but she retained her cheerfulness, and if asked how she was, she would always smile and answer: "As the Master desires." In the extremity of her last hours, her mind was driven back to her youth in slavery, and she cried out: "The chains are too tight, loosen them a little, please!" After a while, she came round again. Someone asked her, "How are you? Today is Saturday," probably hoping that this would cheer her because Saturday is the day of the week dedicated to Mary, mother of Jesus. Bakhita replied, "Yes, I am so happy: Our Lady... Our Lady!" These were her last audible words.

Bakhita died at 8:10 PM on 8 February 1947. For three days, her body lay in repose while thousands of people arrived to pay their respects. Her remains were translated to the Church of the Holy Family of the Canossian convent of Schio in 1969.

== Legacy and canonization ==
A young student once asked Bakhita: "What would you do, if you were to meet your captors?" Without hesitation, she replied: "If I were to meet those who kidnapped me, and even those who tortured me, I would kneel and kiss their hands. For, if these things had not happened, I would not have been a Christian and a religious today".

The petitions for her canonization began immediately, and the process commenced by Pope John XXIII in 1959, twelve years after her death. On 1 December 1978, Pope John Paul II declared Josephine Venerable, the first step towards canonization. On 17 May 1992, she was declared Blessed and given 8 February as her feast day. On 1 October 2000, she was canonized as Saint Josephine Bakhita. She is venerated as a modern African saint and as a statement against the brutal history of slavery. She is regarded as the patron saint of both the country and the Catholic Church in Sudan. Caritas Bakhita House in London, which provides accommodation and support for women escaping human trafficking, is named in her honour.

Today, Catholics teach that Bakhita's legacy is that transformation is possible through suffering. Her story of deliverance from physical slavery also symbolises all those who find meaning and inspiration in her life for their own deliverance from spiritual slavery. In May 1992, news of her beatification was banned by the authorities in Khartoum, which Pope John Paul II visited nine months later. On 10 February 1993, he solemnly honoured Bakhita on her own soil, saying:

"Rejoice, all of Africa! Bakhita has come back to you. The daughter of Sudan sold into slavery as a living piece of merchandise and yet still free. Free with the freedom of the saints."

Pope Benedict XVI, on 30 November 2007, in the beginning of his second encyclical letter Spe Salvi ("In Hope We Were Saved"), relates her life story as an outstanding example of the Christian hope.

Bakhita is honored with a Lesser Feast on the liturgical calendar of the Episcopal Church in the United States of America, also on 8 February.

In 2023, Canadian sculptor Timothy Schmalz centred his human-trafficking sculpture "Let the Oppressed Go Free" on Bakhita, depicting her opening a trapdoor as she frees human-trafficking victims who emerge from underground. The bronze sculpture was installed near her remains in the Italian city of Schio. Replicas of the sculpture are installed at St. Patrick's Cathedral, New York, USA, and at Regis College in Toronto, Canada.

Several refuges for survivors of sex trafficking and other women in need around the world are named for Bakhita, including a Catholic Worker House in Milwaukee, Wisconsin, in Hamilton, Ontario, Canada., and in Westminster, London, England. Also in London, St Mary's University, Twickenham named its research center on slavery, exploitation and abuse the Bakhita Centre, which opened in 2015.

== In art ==
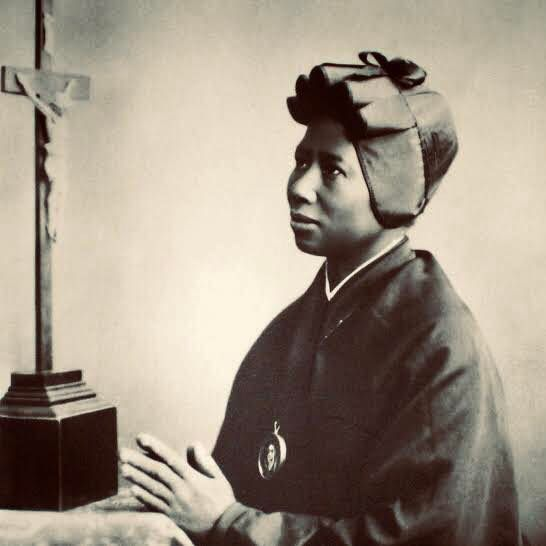
Photograph of Saint Josephine Bakhita (c. 1910)

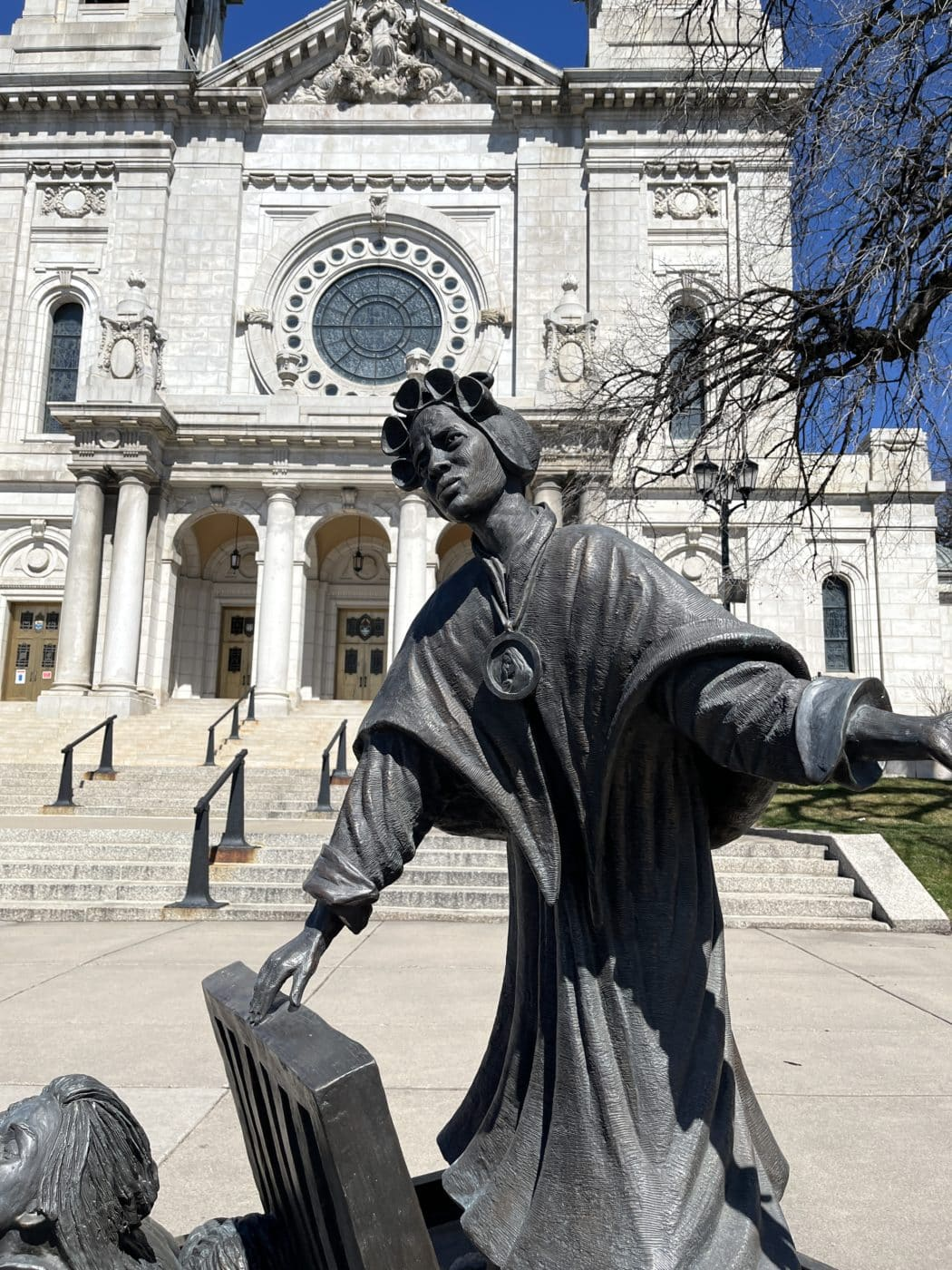
Timothy Schmalz, Let the Oppressed Go Free (detail) (2023)

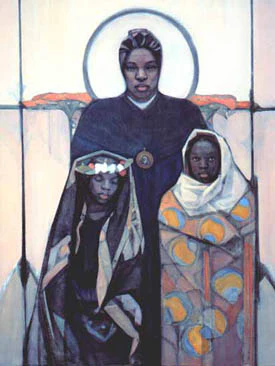
Janet Mckenzie, St. Josephine Bakhita

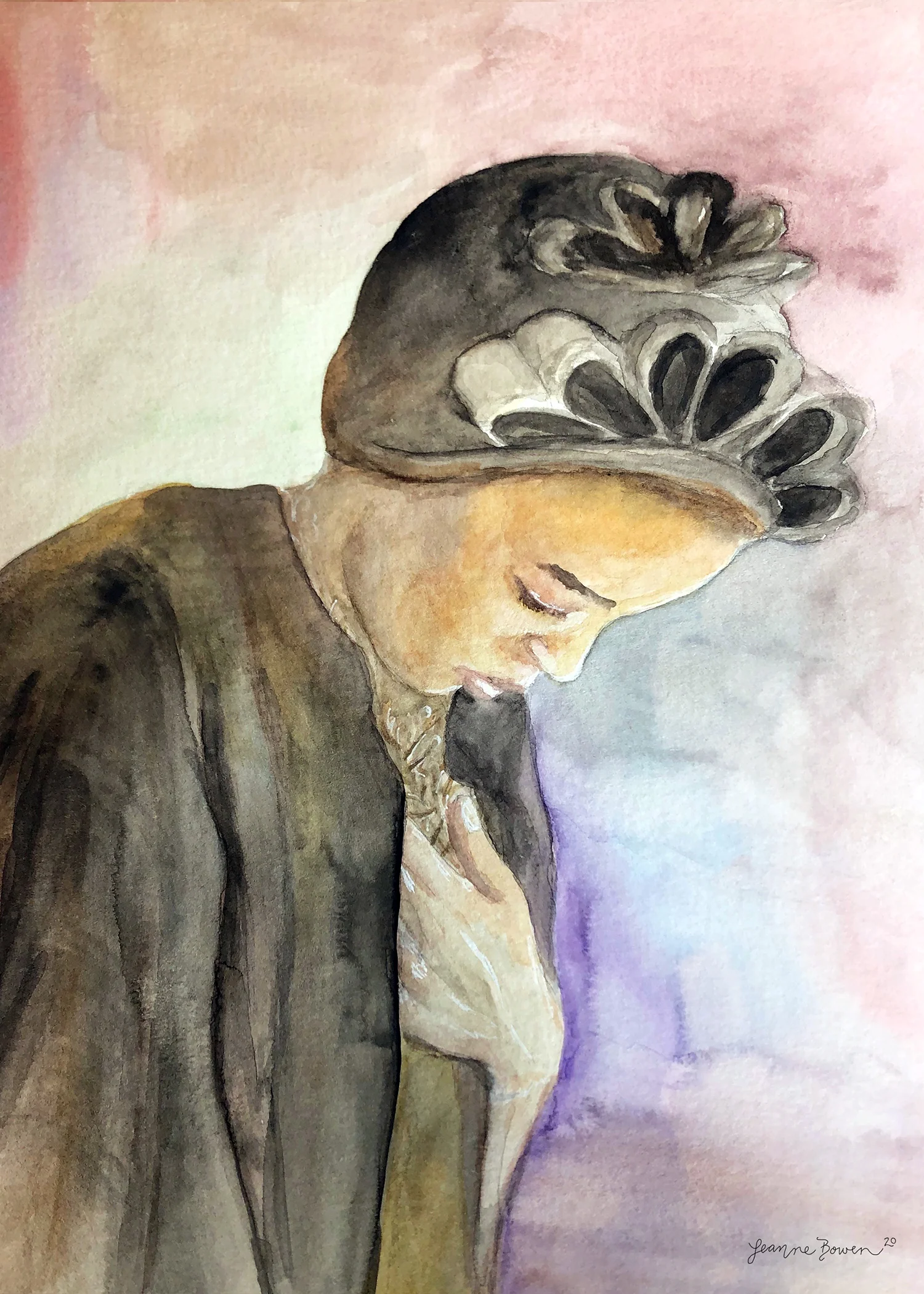
Leanne Bowen, Saint Josephine Bakhita

== See also ==
- Radio Bakhita in South Sudan

== Bibliography ==
- African Online News (2000). Josephine Bakhita – an African Saint. 2000 October 14. Retrieved on 5 January 2010.
- Zanini, Roberto Italo (2009). Bakhita: From Slave to Saint. Ignatius Press. ISBN 9781586176891.
- Burns, Paul; Butler, Alban (2005). Butler's Lives of the Saints: Supplement of New Saints and Blesseds, Volume 1, pp. 52–55. Liturgical Press. ISBN 0-8146-1837-5.
- Carter, Rozann (2011). St. Josephine Bakhita and the Door to Holiness. Word On Fire, 2011. Retrieved on 7 February 2012.
- Copeland, M. Shawn (2009). St Josephine Bakhita. In: Perry, Susan ed. Holiness and the Feminine Spirit: the Art of Janet McKenzie. New York, pp. 113–118. ISBN 1-57075-844-1.
- Dagnino, Maria Luisa (1993). Bakhita Tells Her Story. Third edition, 142 p. Canossiane Figlie della Carità, Roma. Includes the complete text of Bakhita's autobiography (pp. 37–68).
- Davis, Cyprian (2000). Black Catholic Theology: A Historical Perspective. In: Theological Studies, 61, pp. 656–671.
- Hurst, Ryan. Mahdist Revolution (1881-1898). In: Online Encyclopedia of Significant People in Global African History. Retrieved on 8 June 2011.
- Hutchison, Robert (1999). Their Kingdom Come: Inside the Secret World of Opus Dei, St. Martin's Press. ISBN 0-312-19344-0.
- Maynard, Jean Olwen (2002). Josephine Bakhita: The Lucky One. London, 76 p. ISBN 1-86082-150-2.
- Olmi, Véronique (2017). Bakhita. Ed. Albin Michel, Paris, 455 p. ISBN 978-2-226-39322-7.
- O'Malley, Vincent (2001). St. Josephine Bakhita. In: Saints of Africa, pp. 32–35. Our Sunday Visitor Publishing. ISBN 0-87973-373-X.
- Roche, Aloysius (1964). Bakhita, Pearl of the Sudan. Verona Fathers, London, 96 p.
- Roullet, Hervé (2015). Joséphine Bakhita, l'esclave devenue sainte. Paris, Ed. Emmanuel, 174 p.
- Zanini, Roberto Italo (2000). Bakhita: A Saint For the Third Millennium. Orca Printing Company, 190 p.
- Zanolini, Ida (2000). Tale of Wonder: Saint Giuseppina Bakhita. 8th edition, 255 p. ISBN 2-7468-0294-5.
