= When I Was Naked =

Sculpture by Timothy Schmalz

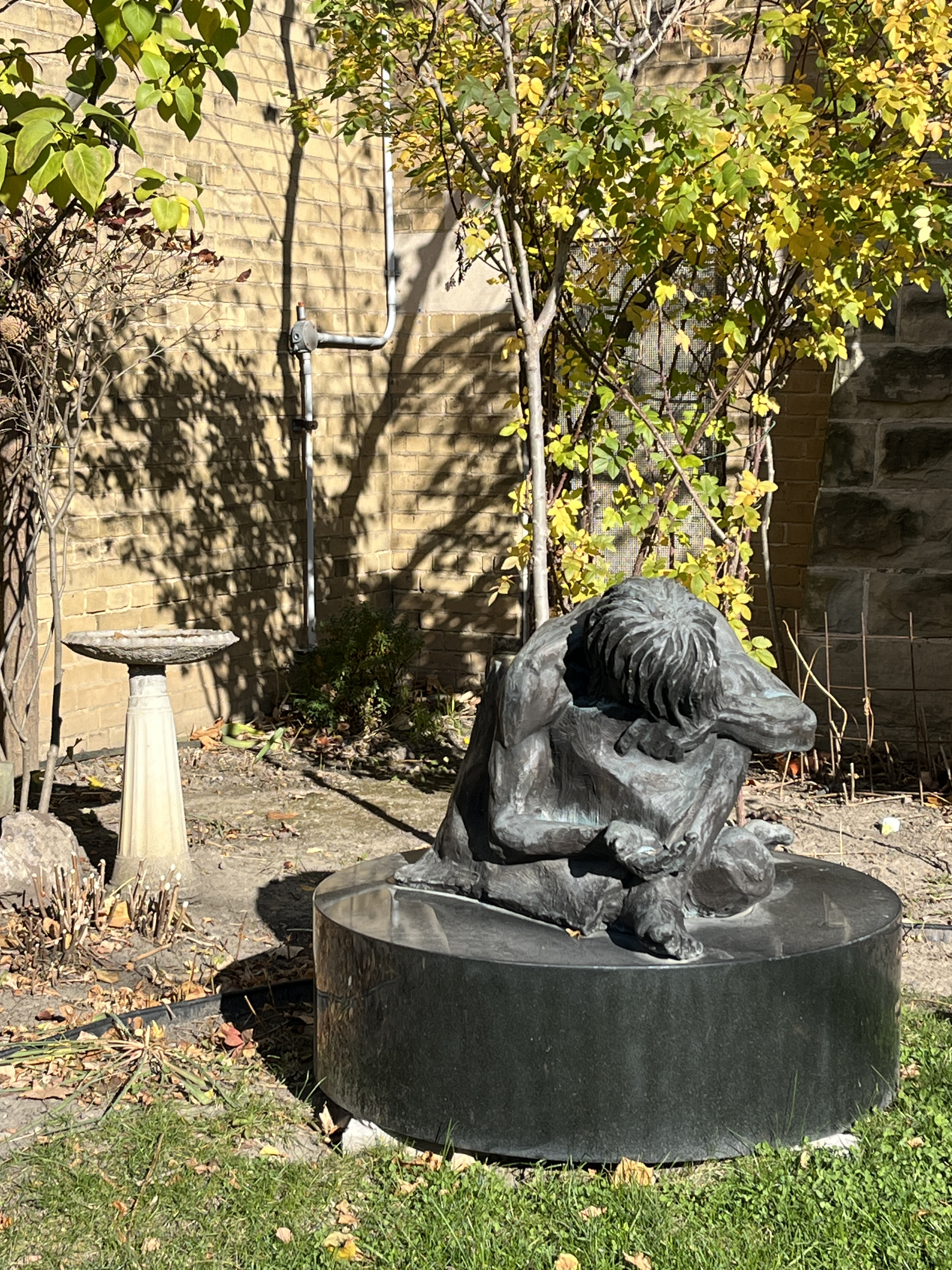
- The statue at St. Patrick's Church in Toronto, 2023
- Artist: Timothy Schmalz
- Year: 2016 (Note: The original cast of the statue in Rome was unveiled in 2016.)
- Medium: Bronze
- Subject: Jesus
- Dimensions: 61 cm × 76 cm × 71 cm (24 in × 30 in × 28 in)

When I Was Naked, also known as When I Was Naked You Clothed Me, is a sculpture of Jesus by Canadian artist Timothy Schmalz. The original sculpture was installed in 2016 at San Pietro in Vincoli in Rome. Additional replicas of the statue by Schmalz have been placed in various locations across North America, starting in 2017.

This sculpture is part of the Matthew 25 Series by Schmalz. The series of 5 sculptures depicts the Bible passage of Matthew 25:31-46. These sculptures include: "When I was Naked", "When I was a Stranger", "When I was Hungry, Thirsty", "When I was Sick", and "When I was in Prison".

== Description ==
The work depicts Jesus seated with His head bent down and His hand outstretched. He is naked and covered by a piece of cardboard.

The dimensions of the statue is 61 by 76 by 71 centimetres (24 by 30 by 28 in).

== History ==
When I Was Naked was designed by Timothy Schmalz, a Canadian sculptor and a Catholic. Schmalz was partly inspired to create the statue in 2013 when he visited Rome to discuss the creation of another sculpture, Homeless Jesus. While in Rome, Schmalz saw homeless people across his hotel, building things with cardboard and getting ready for the night. The scene helped Schmalz realize that his next sculpture needed to be a naked figure to make sense.

The first cast of When I Was Naked was installed inside a portico at the entrance of San Pietro in Vincoli in Rome.

In 2017, a year after the first cast was unveiled, a copy of the statue created by Schmalz was installed at the Cathedral Basilica of St. Peter in Chains in Cincinnati. By the end of 2019, there were copies of the sculpture installed in four other Catholic parishes, including the one in Cincinnati, one at the Cathedral of the Most Blessed Sacrament in Detroit, one outside St. Patrick's Church in Toronto, and another at the Cathedral of St. Matthew the Apostle in Washington, D.C. Another copy of the sculpture was unveiled in 2021 at Malachi House on Clinton Avenue in Cleveland.
