= Let the Oppressed Go Free =

Sculpture by Timothy Schmalz

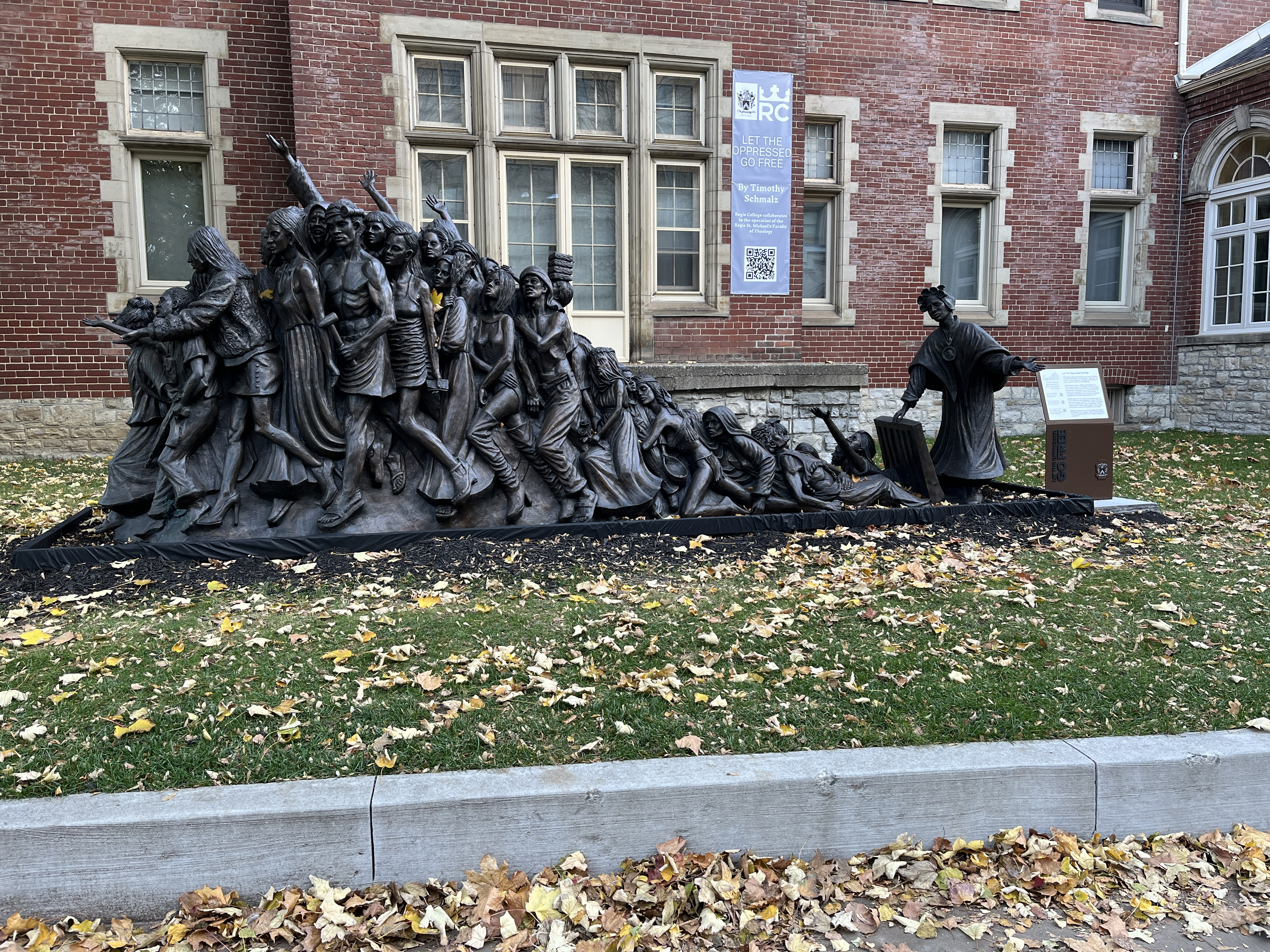
- Copy in Toronto, 2023
- Artist: Timothy Schmalz
- Year: 2023
- Medium: bronze
- Subject: St Josephine Bahkita
- Dimensions: 2.4 m × 1.2 m × 6 m (94 in × 47 in × 240 in)

Let the Oppressed Go Free is a sculpture of the Afro-Italian nun and saint Josephine Bakhita created by Timothy Schmalz.

== Description ==
It depicts formerly enslaved Afro-Italian nun and saint Josephine Bakhita opening a trapdoor as she frees figures that represent human-trafficking victims. The sculpture contains almost a hundred figures representing the different faces of human trafficking including sex exploitation, forced labor, debt bondage and more. Men, women, and children, including an infant are shown to demonstrate the wide range of victims of human trafficking.

The sculpture’s inspiration and name come from the Bible passage Isaiah 58:6 “Is not this the kind of fasting I have chosen: to loose the chains of injustice and untie the cords of the yoke, to set the oppressed free and break every yoke?”

29 June 2023, the sculpture was installed near the remains of Josephine Bahkita in the Italian city of Schio. The sculpture installed in Schio is the original work. Replicas have also been installed at St. Patrick's Cathedral, New York, USA, and at Regis College in Toronto, Canada.

The original is made of bronze and is 6 meters long, 1.2 meters wide and 2.4 meters high, weighing over three tons.
