= When I Was Sick =

Sculpture by Timothy Schmalz

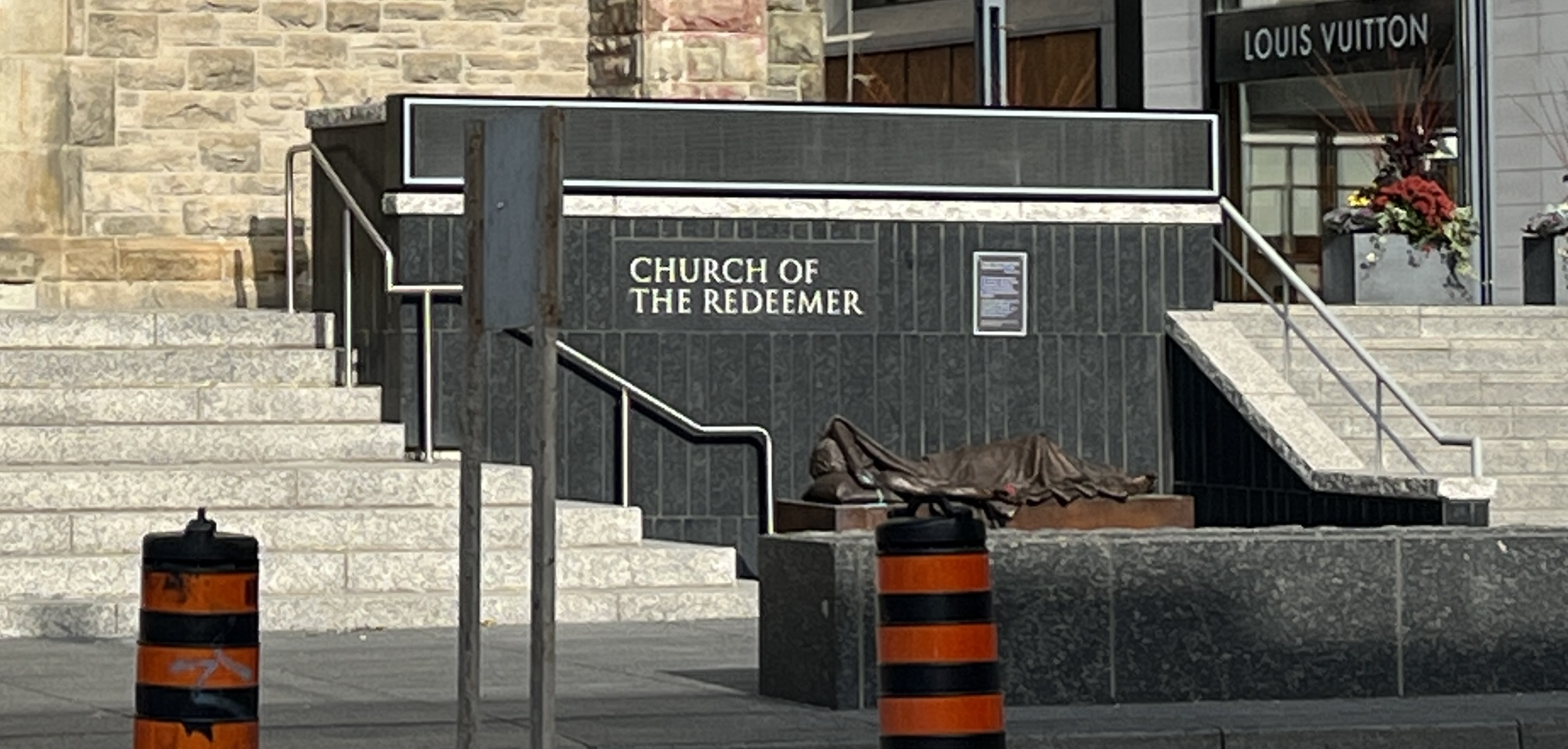
- The copy in Toronto in 2023
- Artist: Timothy Schmalz
- Year: 2016
- Type: Sculpture
- Medium: Bronze
- Subject: Jesus
- Dimensions: 53 cm × 180 cm × 81 cm (21 in × 71 in × 32 in)

When I Was Sick, also known as When I Was Sick You Visited Me, is a bronze sculpture by Timothy Schmalz that depicts an infirmed Jesus suffering from sickness. The sculpture is 53 by 180 by 81 centimetres (21 by 71 by 32 in).

The sculpture is part of the Matthew 25 Series by Schmalz. The series of 5 sculptures depicts the Bible passage of Matthew 25:31-46. These sculptures include: "When I was Naked", "When I was a Stranger", "When I was Hungry, Thirsty", "When I was Sick", and "When I was in Prison".

== History ==
When I Was Sick was designed by Canadian sculptor Timothy Schmalz. The original sculpture was installed in 2016 at Ospedale di Santo Spirito in Sassia in Rome. Additional replicas of the statue by Schmalz have been placed in various locations across North America, with the first copy being installed at St. Joseph's Health Centre in Hamilton, Ontario.

Other copies of When I Was Sick were installed in Cleveland, Youngstown, Ohio, and Toronto. The copy in Cleveland was acquired by the Community West Foundation and was installed at the Cleveland Clinic Lutheran Hospital in 2021. The Youngstown copy was unveiled at Mercy Health's St. Elizabeth Hospital in 2022, as a part of a larger memorial dedicated to COVID-19 pandemic victims and health care teams that cared for them. The Toronto copy was installed in 2023 outside the Church of the Redeemer.
