= Angels Unawares =

2019 sculpture in St. Peter's Square in the Vatican

- Artist: Timothy Schmalz
- Year: 2019
- Type: Sculpture
- Medium: Bronze
- Subject: Group of migrants and refugees
- Website: angelsunawares.org

Angels Unawares is a bronze sculpture by Timothy Schmalz installed in St. Peter's Square in the Vatican since September 29, 2019, the 105th World Migrant and Refugee Day.

This statue was inaugurated by Pope Francis in 2019 for the 105th World Day of Migrants and Refugees. At its inauguration, Pope Francis said he wanted the sculpture "to remind everyone of the evangelical challenge of hospitality".

== History ==
The six-meter-long sculpture depicts a group of migrants and refugees on a boat wearing clothes that show they originate from diverse cultures and historical moments. For example, there are a Jew fleeing Nazi Germany, a Syrian departing the Syrian civil war, and a Pole escaping the communist regime. The sculptor of the work said that he "wanted to show the different moods and emotions involved in a migrant's journey". Previously, the artist had already made sculptures of a similar theme as Homeless Jesus. The work includes angel wings, through which the author suggests that a migrant is secretly an angel in our midst. The artist's inspiration was Hebrews 13:2: "Do not neglect to show hospitality to strangers, for thereby some have entertained angels unawares". It was the first time in 400 years, i.e. since Bernini, that a new sculpture was installed in St Peter's Square. The idea for the sculpture originated with Cardinal Michael Czerny, a fellow Canadian and undersecretary of the Migrants and Refugees Section, who commissioned it in 2016. Among the people represented on the ship are the Cardinal's parents, who immigrated to Canada from Czechoslovakia. The sculpture was funded by a family of migrants from northern Italy, the Rudolph P. Bratty Family. On September 29, 2019, Pope Francis and four refugees from various parts of the world inaugurated the sculpture. A smaller reproduction, about a meter and a half high, will be permanently installed in the Basilica of Saint Paul Outside the Walls in Rome. A replica of the sculpture has been displayed in Boston College, United States since 15 November 2020. A life-size replica was shown in Miami in February 2021 until 8 April 2021. Archbishop of Miami Thomas Wenski stated about the statue: "This is a representation of the human family and the story of migration and certainly, that’s the story of Miami. Miami is the Ellis Island of the South, and this, I think, represents that very well." He then blessed the replica, commenting: "May all who gaze upon it be filled with compassion for the stranger among us and eager to extend a hand of friendship."

In April 2021, a replica was put in front of Notre Dame Seminary in New Orleans. After a national tour, this sculpture was installed on the campus of The Catholic University in Washington, DC in fall of 2021.

On November 3, 2022, a replica was unveiled at Saint Joseph's Oratory—located in the multicultural borough of Cote-des-Neiges also known as the Neighbourhood of Nations, in Montreal, Quebec, Canada—in the presence of the artist Timothy Schmalz and Oratory rector Father Michael DeLaney, CSC. “[H]ost[ing] the sculpture [is] a continuation of the mission of the founder of Saint Joseph’s Oratory of Mount Royal, Saint Brother André, CSC. An international crossroads, the Oratory is a significant place of welcome for many people upon their arrival in this country.”

== See also ==
- Index of Vatican City-related articles
