= Giovanni Battista Parodi =

Italian painter

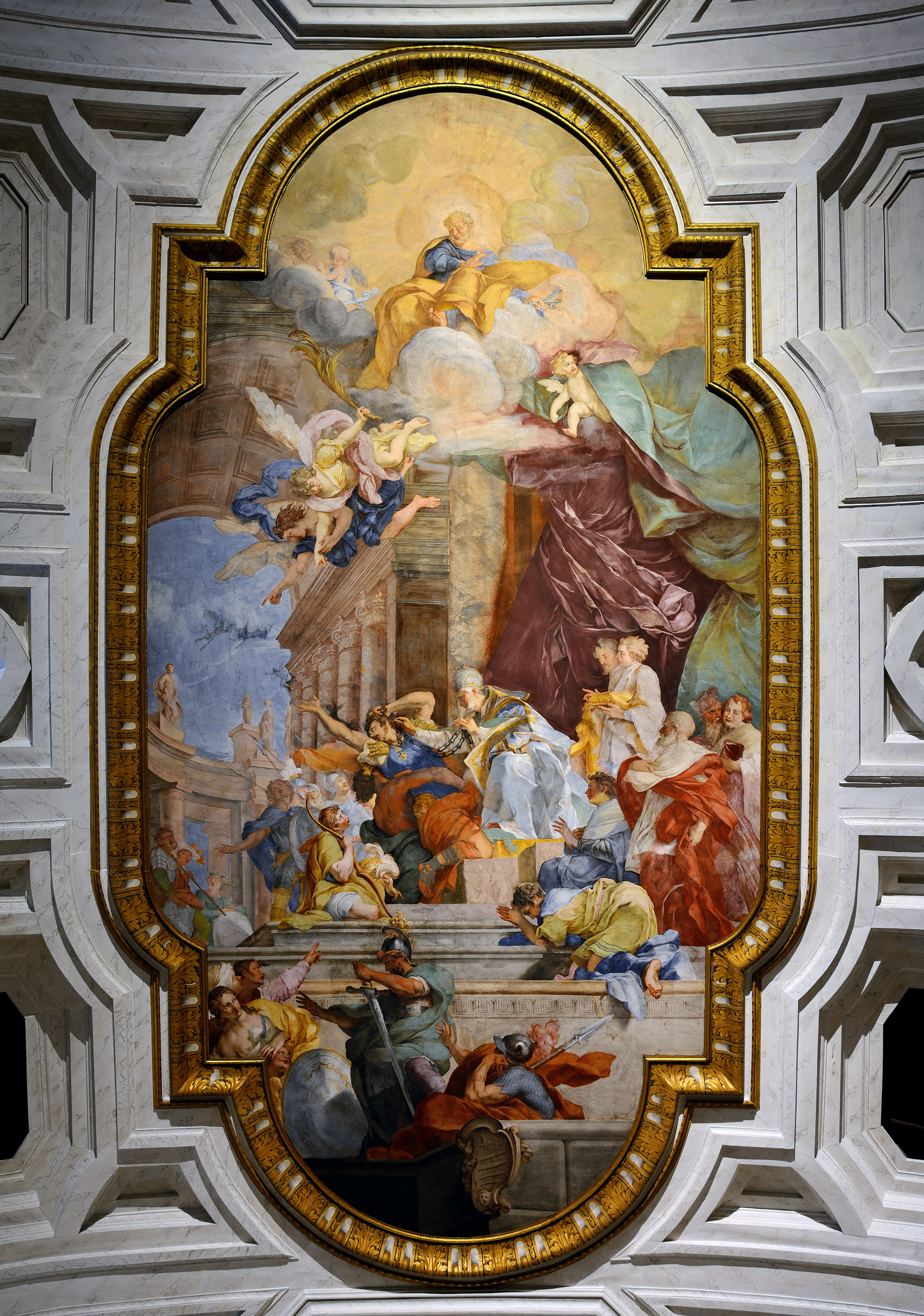
The Miracle of the Chains of Peter (1706), ceiling fresco in San Pietro in Vincoli, Rome

Giovanni Battista Parodi (1674–1730) was an Italian painter, born in Genoa. He belonged to an Italian family of artists. His father was the sculptor and wood-carver Filippo Parodi (1630–1702). His brother was Domenico Parodi (1672–1742), a painter, sculptor and architect.

In Genoa his frescoes are to be seen in the Church of Santa Maria Maddalena, but he spent most of career in Milan and Bergamo. He added church ceilings in Milan, contributed to the decoration of churches in Bergamo and to the Palazzo Mazzoleni in Bibbiena. In Rome, his sole prominent public commission was for the fresco of the ceiling of San Pietro in Vincoli in 1706 and the vault medallions (c. 1706) in Santa Maria dell’Orto, Rome.
