= Dante Garden =

Sculpture garden in Toronto

The Dante Sculpture Garden
- Interactive map of The Dante Sculpture Garden
- Type: sculpture park
- Location: Toronto, Ontario
- Coordinates: 43.66514°N 79.39083°W
- Website: www.dantesculpture.com

The Dante Garden or the Dante Sculpture Park is a sculpture garden located on the campus of the University of St. Michael's College in Toronto, Ontario. The garden consists of 100 bronze page-like relief sculptures created by Canadian sculptor Timothy Schmalz, making him the first artist to represent the full poem through sculpture. Each of the sculptures depict a single scene from each canto of Dante Alghieri's Divine Comedy, creating an "open-air book". In the center of the garden is a life-sized sculpture of Dante hunched over, appearing to write the first canto which he holds in his hand.

The Dante Garden is freely accessible to the public and is intended to provide a visual read or walk through of all three poems of the Divine Comedy: Inferno (Hell), Purgatorio (Purgatory), and Paradiso (Heaven).

== History ==
In 2021, Schmalz undertook the project to celebrate Dante Alighieri, creating an anthology of pieces representing the first sculptural interpretation of the entire work of the Divine Comedy in 700 years. The project began under COVID-19 restrictions, where Schmalz was essentially "locked away" in his studio in Ontario and had the time for the undertaking. Schmalz noted when Dante wrote the Divine Comedy, he was in exile from his native Florence. "I am sculpting it while all the world is in social isolation, in a sense, in exile," Schmalz said in 2020.

On September 8, 2021, Canto 1 of Inferno, the first of the cantos to be cast in bronze, was presented to Pope Francis at the Vatican. On September 14, the date Dante is believed to have died in 1321, Schmalz completed the 100th sculpture, Canto 33 of Paradise, in person at the Badia Florentia. The event was both open to the public and live streamed. Later, a life-sized sculpture of Dante was installed at the Badia Florentia with many cantos scattered throughout the monastery.

On July 5, 2022, the Dante sculpture holding Canto 1 of Inferno was officially unveiled at 2 Adams Road, Robinson College, Cambridge University, UK. A reception was held in the Adams Road Garden to celebrate the arrival of the new work of art. The programme included readings from Dante's Divine Comedy, in both English and Italian, the singing of two of the psalms that are of central importance in Dante's text and a short address introducing Dante's work and its sculptural representation by Professor Robin Kirkpatrick, a Life Fellow of Robinson College, Emeritus Professor in English and Italian Literature.

Dante Garden Toronto - Paradise Canto 4-6

In spring 2022, the complete work - the Dante sculpture and all 100 cantos - was installed on the southwest corner of University of Toronto's St. Michael's campus.

== Description ==
The format of the pieces is relatively small: page-like, two feet tall and one foot wide.
