= Janet McKenzie =

Artist on religious themes

Janet McKenzie is an American artist known for her depictions of religious themes which represent a wide range of human subjects. Her painting "Jesus of the People," for which she used an African American woman as the model, won the Jesus 2000 competition hosted by the National Catholic Reporter.

== Biography ==
Born and raised in and near New York City, McKenzie studied at the Fashion Institute of Technology and the Art Students League. She relocated to Vermont with her son, and supported herself through her art, often painting female figures. In the 1990s, she became more interested in creating art with sacred themes, and in including images of people of color in her work. In 1999, she won the competition sponsored by the National Catholic Reporter for an image of "Jesus 2000." Her painting Jesus of the People, depicting Jesus as an African-American woman, was met with both acclaim and condemnation.

The book, Holiness and the Feminine Spirit: The Art of Janet McKenzie by Susan Perry features 29 paintings with accompanying reflections by religious leaders and writers such as Sr. Joan Chittister, O.S.B. Sr. Helen Prejean C.S.J., author China Galland and Bishop Katharine Jefferts Schori. Deborah Sokolove reviewed this book saying, "This book is an artist's dream, in which Janet McKenzie is given the rare opportunity to receive thoughtful, passionate reflections on her work from some of the most important women writers living today."

== Selected works ==
McKenzie's work, Jesus of the People won the National Catholic Reporter's worldwide art competition in 2000. Her work placed first among 1,678 entries by 104 artists from 19 countries and 6 continents.

In 2016, McKenzie created a piece entitled Jesus of Arrupe College, for Arrupe College in Chicago, Loyola University of Chicago's two year college, depicting Jesus and his companions in the likeness of the Arrupe College student body.

Her painting Sanctuary (d. 2020) was acquired by the Basilica of St. Mary in Minneapolis, MN for its permanent collection. The work depicts a woman and child of color and was inspired by the text of Psalm 61: 4 – "Let me live forever in your sanctuary, safe beneath the shelter of your wings."
