= Timothy Schmalz =

Canadian sculptor (born 1969)

- Born: 1969 (age 56–57); Elmira, Ontario, Canada
- Notable work: Homeless Jesus; Angels Unawares; Let the Oppressed Go Free
- Website: timothypaulschmalz.com

Timothy Paul Schmalz (born 1969) is a Canadian sculptor from St. Jacobs, Ontario, Canada.

Cast editions of his life-sized sculptures have been installed in major cities in front of some of the most historically significant Christian sites in the world, including Capernaum, the Vatican and Fatima. In recent years, he has worked directly with the Vatican to create several sculptures that highlight spiritual concerns in our modern day.

Schmalz is best known for his Homeless Jesus that he created in reaction to the many homeless living on the streets. Schmalz conceives his sculptures with keen devotion to Catholicism and gives his time to each piece, sometimes taking as much as 10 years forming the idea and sculpting it. Some of his works are created in series and others are single pieces. Installments of his work have brought his visual message across the globe with Homeless Jesus having been displayed in many places including St. Peter's Basilica.

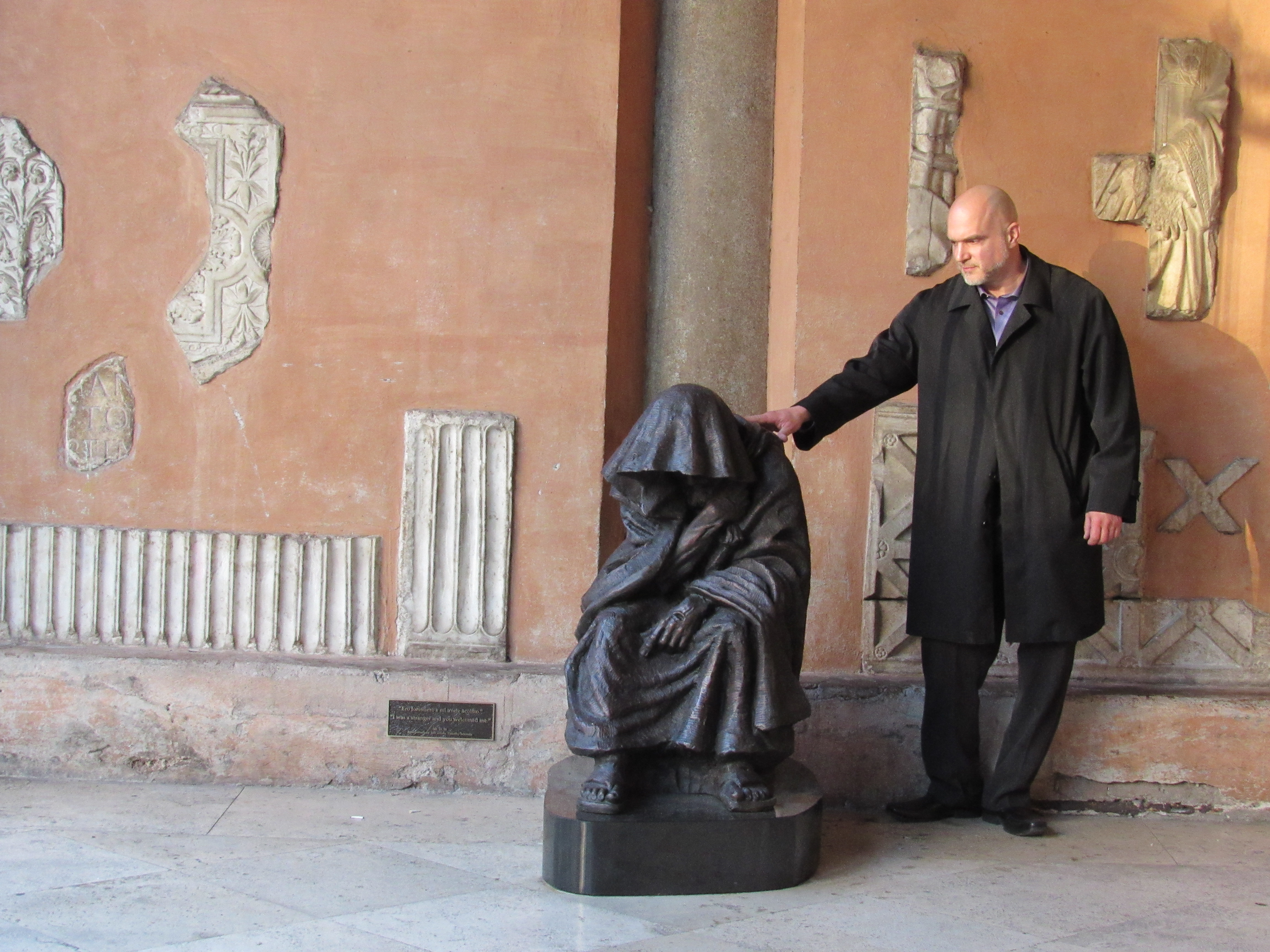
When I was a Stranger, designed by Schmalz

== Work ==
=== Religious works ===
==== A Quiet Moment (1995) ====
In 1995, Schmalz created A Quiet Moment, giving society a new way to look at the Holy Family. The statue is a depiction the Virgin Mary holding an infant Jesus surrounded by the arms of St Joseph, showing the love and intimacy of a happy family. Since that time, Schmalz has recreated the sculpture on many different scales. A ten foot model of the sculpture is among the largest in Bethlehem, which was installed in the Holy Land in 2000 for the anniversary of Christianity. In 2004, Schmalz had the opportunity to meet Pope John Paul II at the Vatican and gift him with a bronze model of this popular piece.

==== Homeless Jesus (2013) ====
The Homeless Jesus statue depicts Jesus as a homeless person, sleeping on a park bench. His face and hands are obscured, hidden under a blanket, but Crucifixion wounds on his feet reveal his identity. The statue has been described as a "visual translation" of the Gospel of Matthew passage in which Jesus tells his disciples, "as you did it to one of the least of my brothers, so you did it to me." The bronze sculpture was intended to be provocative, with its sculptor, Schmalz commenting, "That's essentially what the sculpture is there to do. It's meant to challenge people." As of today, over 50 bronze casts of Homeless Jesus are installed in religiously significant and historical locations around the world from Vatican City to Capernaum, Israel to Johannesburg, South Africa to Singapore.

==== Divine Comedy ====
In 2021 Schmalz completed sculpting all 100 Cantos of Dante Alighieri's Divine Comedy to celebrate what would have been Dante's 700th birthday, including a life-sized sculpture of Dante. Each of the bronze relief sculptures highlights one of the most interesting scenes from the canto, creating a visual read of the epic poem. The Dante Garden, installed on the campus of the University of St. Michael's College in Toronto, Canada is an outdoor sculpture park, with all 100 bronze cantos of the Divine Comedy encircling the life-sized statue of Dante.

==== Matthew 25 series ====
The "Matthew 25 Series" is a collection of five sculptures that bring to life the scripture passage Matthew 25:31-46 in which Jesus uses the parable of "The Judgement of the Nations" to ask his followers to see him in every person they meet, especially in those who are suffering. These sculptures include: "When I was Naked", "When I was a Stranger", "When I was Hungry, Thirsty", "When I was Sick", and "When I was in Prison". The complete Matthew 25 series has been installed throughout the cities of both Rome, Italy and Cleveland, OH.

==== Angels Unawares ====
The Angels Unawares bronze sculpture - the first sculpture to be installed in St. Peter's Square in centuries - highlights the modern day migrant. As his inspiration for the piece, Schmalz used the Bible verse Hebrew 13:2 "Be welcoming to strangers, for many have entertained angels unawares." The epic 20 ft sculpture shows a crowd of migrants upon a boat headed towards new horizons, and in the center there is an angel, only identifiable by the wings that rise above the sculpture.

==== Be Welcoming ====
The Be Welcoming sculpture was created in 2019, inspired by the same scripture text that is the inspiration for the Angels Unawares monument, Hebrews 13:2 "Be welcoming to strangers, many have entertained angels unawares." The sculpture shows a weary traveler/pilgrim who visually transform into an angel when the one walks over to the seat that the figure is welcoming the viewer to take. According to Schmalz, "Be Welcoming" intends to show that all humanity possesses a spiritual nature resembling angels. It reminds us that we can become like angels on our journey through life, and also that spirituality is found only when one is generous to oneself, others and God. The sculpture is installed on locations associated with Christian pilgrimages, including El Camino de Santiago in Spain and the St. Padre Pio Shrine in Southern Italy.

==== Let the Oppressed Go Free ====
After the completion of Angels Unawares, Schmalz was requested by the Vatican to create a sculpture on the theme of human trafficking. The work Let the Oppressed Go Free shows almost one hundred victims of human trafficking being freed by the former slave St Josephine Bakhita. This massive bronze sculpture is installed in the Shrine of St. Bahkita in Schio, Italy.

While covering yet another sculpture Schmalz had created at the request of Pope Francis, Mary, Untier of Knots, Vatican Correspondent for the National Catholic Reporter, Christopher White, noted: "Pope Julius II had Michelangelo and Raphael. Pope Francis has Timothy Schmalz.

=== Secular works ===
Schmalz has also created many secular pieces. On October 23, 2015, a 4-metre (13 ft) tall statue commemorating Gordon Lightfoot was unveiled in Orillia. The statue, Golden Leaves, features young Lightfoot playing guitar surrounded by a ring of maple leaves. The leaves each contain an image inspired by one song. Schmalz plans to sculpt each leaf and place them along the Lightfoot Trail in Orillia and make duplicates that will be placed at locations fitting for each song. A leaf inspired by the song Black Day in July was revealed in Tudhope Park on July 10, 2016, as the second installment in the Gordon Lightfoot Sculpture Park.

Schmalz also created the Canadian Veterans Memorial. Schmalz worked every Canadian Armed Forces uniform into this piece that stretches towards the sky using perspective. He also networked through the local paper asking for families to send in images of family or friends who had served in the war.

=== Documentary about Timothy Schmalz ===
A documentary entitled Angels Unawares about the work of Timothy Schmalz was released by Agoras Media in April 2025. The film was directed by veteran documentary filmmaker Nicolas Rossier.

== Personal life ==
Schmalz is married and has a son and a daughter. He is Catholic.
