= Homeless Jesus =

Sculpture depicting Jesus as a homeless person

- The statue at Regis College
- Artist: Timothy Schmalz
- Year: 2013
- Type: Sculpture
- Medium: Bronze
- Subject: Jesus
- Dimensions: 91 cm × 61 cm × 213 cm (36 in × 24 in × 84 in)
- Location: Toronto, Ontario, Canada (Note: Copies of the statue have also been installed in several other cities.); 43.66393°N 79.3899°W
- Owner: Regis College

Homeless Jesus, also known as Jesus the Homeless (French: Jésus le sans-abri), is a bronze sculpture by Timothy Schmalz depicting Jesus as a homeless person, sleeping on a park bench. The original sculpture was installed in 2013 at Regis College, a theological college federated of the University of Toronto on its St. George campus. Numerous copies of the statue have been installed in several other locations beginning in 2014. As of 2017, over 50 copies were created and placed around the world.

== Description ==
The statue depicts Jesus as a homeless person, sleeping on a park bench. His face and hands are obscured, hidden under a blanket, but Crucifixion wounds on his feet reveal his identity. The statue has been described as a "visual translation" of the Gospel of Matthew passage in which Jesus tells his disciples, "as you did it to one of the least of my brothers, you did it to me". The bronze sculpture was intended to be provocative, with its sculptor, Timothy Schmalz commenting, "That's essentially what the sculpture is there to do. It's meant to challenge people."

The dimensions of the statue is 91 by 61 by 213 centimetres (36 by 24 by 84 in), providing enough room for someone to sit on the bench.

== History ==
Homeless Jesus was designed by Timothy Schmalz, a Canadian sculptor and devout Catholic. Schmalz was inspired to create the statue after seeing a homeless person sleeping on a park bench in Toronto in 2012.

Schmalz visited Pope Francis in Vatican City in November 2013 to present a miniature version of his statue. He recalled the Pope's reaction, "He walked over to the sculpture, and it was just chilling because he touched the knee of the Jesus the Homeless sculpture, and closed his eyes and prayed. It was like, that's what he's doing throughout the whole world: Pope Francis is reaching out to the marginalized."

He offered the first cast to St. Michael's Cathedral in Toronto and St. Patrick's Cathedral in New York, but both churches declined. One spokesperson for St. Michael's said the church declined because appreciation "was not unanimous" and it was undergoing restoration. Similarly, a spokesperson for St. Patrick's complimented the work but declined to purchase the cast due to ongoing renovations. The Archdiocese of Toronto tried to locate alternative locations for Schmalz, including St. Augustine's Seminary in Scarborough, but the location was rejected by Schmalz, who desired a location that would provide the sculpture with a wider public reach. Regis College, a Jesuit school of theology federated with the University of Toronto, acquired the first cast in 2013 and installed it outside its main entrance. The acquisition was provided through a donation from Peter Benninger.

Installations in other locations followed. The first location in the United States was located at St. Alban's Episcopal Church in Davidson, North Carolina. It was purchased for $22,000 and displayed as a memorial to parishioner Kate McIntyre, who had an affinity for public art. According to the Rev. David Buck, rector of St. Alban's, "It gives authenticity to our church. This is a relatively affluent church, to be honest, and we need to be reminded ourselves that our faith expresses itself in active concern for the marginalized of society". Buck welcomed discussion about the sculpture and considers it a "Bible lesson for those used to seeing Jesus depicted in traditional religious art as the Christ of glory, enthroned in finery." Furthermore, he said in an interview with NPR, "We believe that that's the kind of life Jesus had. He was, in essence, a homeless person."

A painting of a homeless Jesus by Peter Howson was unveiled alongside a cast of Homeless Jesus in Nelson Mandela Place, Glasgow, in December 2017.

A lightweight version of Homeless Jesus, made out of wood and fibreglass, was crafted by Schmalz at the request of the Archdiocese of Baltimore in 2017. The lightweight statue was exhibited in several schools, parishes and institutions around Baltimore before it was returned to Schmalz in 2018.

== Reception ==
=== Critical reception ===
Lennie Bennett, an art critic for the Tampa Bay Times noted that the statue was "technically well done", although also remarked that the design is "nothing new or interesting aesthetically". However, Bennett acknowledged Schmalz intended for the statue to be a social statement.

=== Public reaction ===
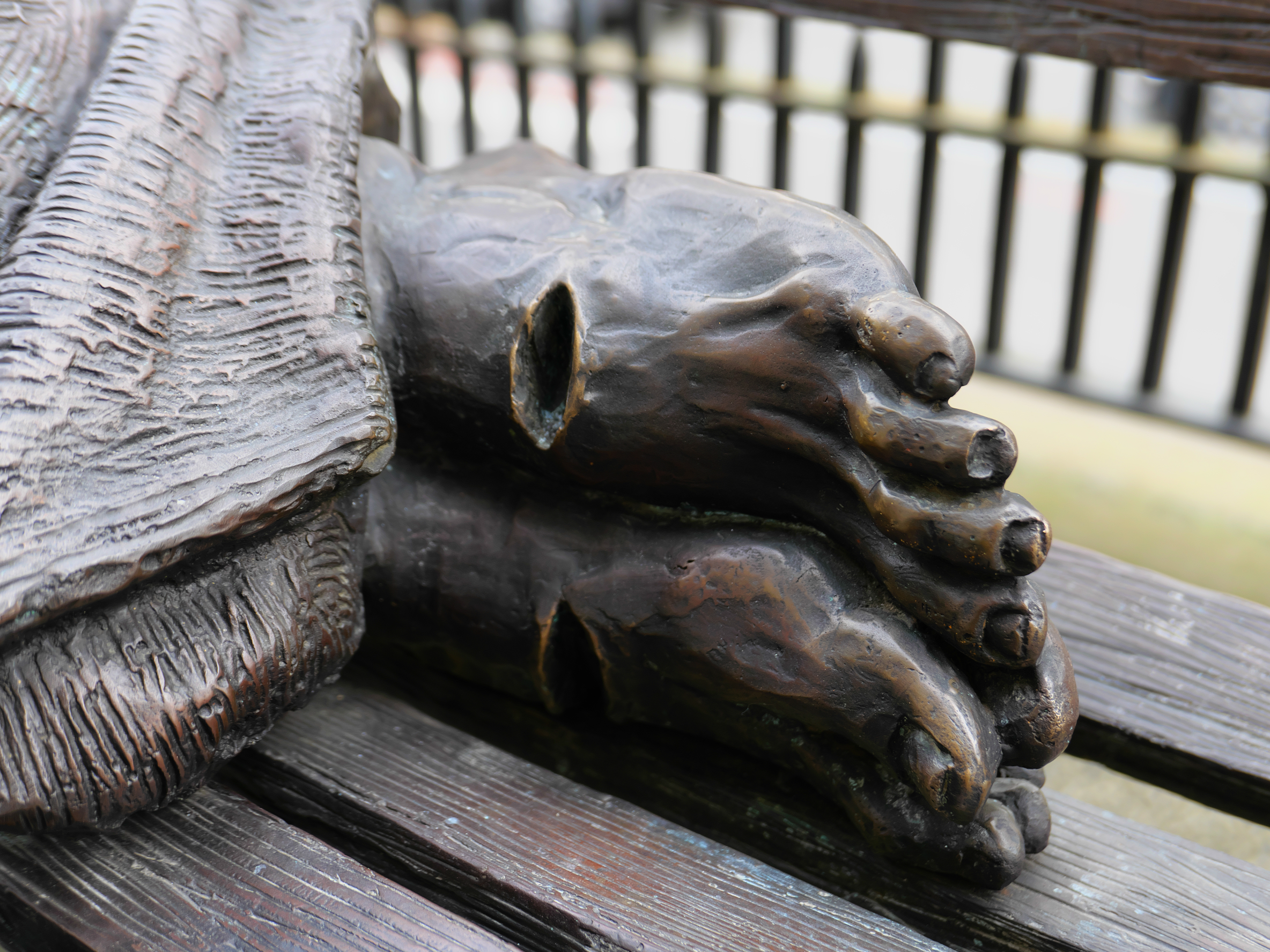
Crucifixion wounds are visible on the statue.

Reception of the statue has been mixed. NPR said, "The reaction [to the cast in Davidson, North Carolina] was immediate. Some loved it; some didn't." Some Davidson residents felt it was an "insulting depiction" of Jesus that "demeaned" the neighbourhood. Another neighbour wrote a letter, saying it "[creeped] him out". However, according to Buck, residents are often seen sitting on the bench alongside the statue, resting their hands on Jesus and praying.

A proposal to install a cast at the Methodist Central Hall was rejected by Westminster City Council in 2016, who voiced concerns the statue would not maintain or improve the character or appearance of the Parliament Square Conservation Area.

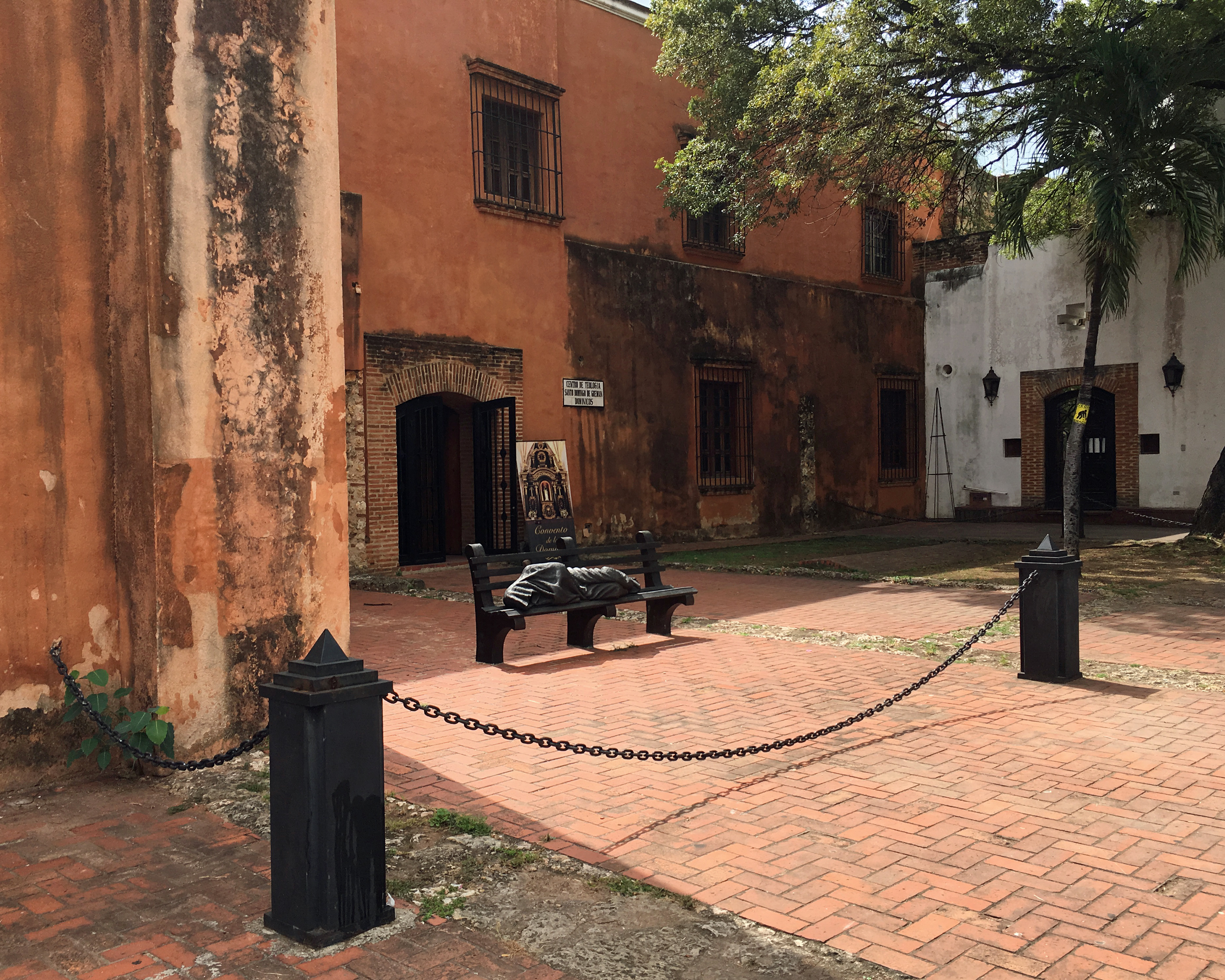
A statue of Homeless Jesus from afar. The statue is occasionally mistaken for a real person on a bench.

The statue's design has occasionally resulted in people mistaking the figure for a real person. When the statue was installed in Davidson, North Carolina, one resident reported they called the police the first time she saw it, mistaking the statue for a real homeless person. After a statue was installed in Hamilton, Ontario, emergency services received several calls during cold and snowy nights from passersby who mistook the statue for a living human. Similar instances of concerned individuals who mistook a Homeless Jesus statue for a homeless person also took place in Minneapolis and Fargo, North Dakota. In October 2020, a Bay Village, Ohio resident mistook a statue installed in the area 20 minutes earlier for a sleeping homeless person and called the police, garnering national attention for highlighting people's privilege and indifference towards homelessness.

== Copies ==
In addition to the original sculpture installed at Regis College in Toronto, a number of copies were installed in other locations around the world. As of 2017, over 50 copies were created by Schmalz. The price of statues made between 2014 and 2018 varied, ranging from US$22,000 to $40,000. It typically takes Schmalz three months to form and cast the work into bronze.

The following list shows some places where copies of the sculpture have been installed permanently.

=== Americas ===
Image	Location	City	Country	Year installed	Notes	Ref.
	Central Presbyterian Church	Austin	United States	2015	Located outside on the premises of the church.	
	St. Vincent de Paul Church	Baltimore	United States	2018	Located outside on the premises of the church.	
	Monserrate Sanctuary	Bogotá	Colombia	2021	Located outside on the premises of the sanctuary.	
	Buenos Aires Metropolitan Cathedral	Buenos Aires	Argentina	2019	Located inside the cathedral.	
	St. Paul's Cathedral	Buffalo, New York	United States	2015	Located outdoors on the premises of the cathedral.	
	St. Clement's Roman Catholic Church	Cambridge, Ontario	Canada	2016	Located outdoors on the premises of the church.	
	St. Marks United Methodist Church	Charleston, West Virginia	United States	2014	Located outdoors on the premises of the church. The eighth cast of the statue installed in the world.	
	Catholic Charities of the Archdiocese of Chicago	Chicago	United States	2014	Located outdoors.	
	Calvary Episcopal Church	Cincinnati	United States	2015	Located outdoors on the premises of the church.	
	Saint Malachi Parish	Cleveland	United States	2021	Located outdoors on the premises of the church. The cast is owned by the Community West Foundation and was previously loaned out and exhibited at St. Barnabas Episcopal Church in Bay Village, Ohio in 2016.	
	Missouri United Methodist Church	Columbia, Missouri	United States	2022	Located outdoors on the premises of the church.	
	St. Ann Catholic Parish	Coppell, Texas	United States	2016	Located outdoors on the premises of the church.	
	Catholic Charities Dallas Central Service Center	Dallas	United States	2018	Located outdoors.	
	St. Alban's Episcopal Church	Davidson, North Carolina	United States	2014	Located outdoors on the premises of the church. The first statue installed in the United States.	
	Father Woody's Haven of Hope	Denver	United States	2017	Located outdoors on the premises of the shelter	
	Saints Peter and Paul Jesuit Catholic Church	Detroit	United States	2015	Located outdoors on the premises of the church. An anonymous alumnus of the University of Detroit Mercy School of Law donated funds for the statue at the church.	
	First Lutheran Church	Fargo, North Dakota	United States	2016	Located outdoors on the premises of the church.	
	Saint Patrick's Roman Catholic Church	Hamilton, Ontario	Canada	2015	Located outdoors on the premises of the church.	
	Roberts Park Methodist Episcopal Church	Indianapolis	United States	2015	Located outdoors on the premises of the church.	
	King's University College	London, Ontario	Canada	2019	Located outside on the institution's campus next to Cardinal Carter Library	
	Jesuit Retreat Center of Los Altos	Los Altos, California	United States	2018	Located outdoors in the center's gardens.	
	St. James Catholic Church	Louisville, Kentucky	United States	2018	Located outdoors on the premises of the church.	
	Mexico City Metropolitan Cathedral	Mexico City	Mexico	2020	Located outdoors on the premises of the cathedral.	
	Basilica of Saint Mary	Minneapolis	United States	2017	Located outdoors on the premises of the basilica.	
	The City of St. Jude Parish	Montgomery, Alabama	United States		Located outdoors on the premises of the City of St. Jude Interpretive Center.	
	St. James United Church	Montreal	Canada	2019	Located outdoors on the premises of the church.	
	Cathedral of St. John the Divine	New York City	United States	2017	Located outdoors on the premises of the cathedral.	
	Catholic Charities of the Archdiocese of Oklahoma City	Oklahoma City	United States	2016	Located outdoors.	
	Christ Church Cathedral	Ottawa	Canada	2018	Located outdoors on the premises of the cathedral.	
	Saint John's Hospice	Philadelphia	United States	2017	Located outdoors on the premises of the hospice.	
	University of Nevada, Reno	Reno, Nevada	United States	2019	Located outside on the university's campus next to Our Lady of Wisdom Newman Center.	
	Rio de Janeiro Cathedral	Rio de Janeiro	Brazil	2018	Located outdoors on the premises of the cathedral.	
	St. Mary's Catholic Church	San Antonio	United States			
	Church and Convent of los Dominicos	Santo Domingo	Dominican Republic	2017	Located outdoors on the premises of the church.	
	St. Luke's Catholic Church	Schenectady	United States	2018	Located outdoors on the premises of the church.	
	The Josephinum (Catholic Housing Services in Western Washington)	Seattle	United States	2017	Located outdoors on the premises of the building.	
	Church of the Palms United Church	Sun City, Arizona	United States	2023	Located outdoors on the premises of the church.	
	Hyde Park United Methodist Church	Tampa	United States	2016	Located outdoors on the premises of the church	
	Trinity Episcopal Church	Toledo, Ohio	United States	2019	Located outdoors on the premises of the church.	
	Valparaiso University	Valparaiso, Indiana	United States	2015	Located outside on the university's campus next to Harre Union	
	Holy Rosary Cathedral	Vancouver	Canada	2017	Located outdoors on the premises of the cathedral.	
	Epiphany Cathedral	Venice, Florida	United States	2020	Located outdoors on the premises of the cathedral.	
	Catholic Charities DC	Washington, D.C.	United States	2015	Located outdoors at the front of the building.	

=== Africa, Asia and Oceania ===
Image	Location	City	Country	Year installed	Notes	Ref.
	St. Peter's Church	Capernaum	Israel	2017	Located outdoors on the premises of the church.	
	Manila Cathedral	Manila	Philippines	2022	Located outdoors on the premises of the church.	
	Newman College	Melbourne	Australia	2019	Located outdoors at the entrance of the college.	
	Seosomun Historical Park	Seoul	South Korea			
	Cathedral of the Good Shepherd	Singapore	Singapore	2016	Located outdoors on the premises of the church.	
	St James' Church	Sydney	Australia	2018	Located outdoors on the premises of the church.	
	Sacred Heart Cathedral	Townsville	Australia	2018	Located outdoors on the premises of the cathedral.	
	Holy Trinity Catholic Church	Johannesburg	South Africa	2017	Located outdoors at the entrance of the church.	
	St. Mary of the Cross MacKillop Church	Ballajura, Perth	Australia	2014	Located outdoors at the entrance of the Church.	

=== Europe ===
Image	Location	City	Country	Year installed	Notes	Ref.
	Mozes en Aäronkerk	Amsterdam	Netherlands	2022	Located outdoors on the premises of the church.	
	Community of Sant'Egidio offices	Antwerp	Belgium		Located outdoors.	
	Santa Anna de Barcelona	Barcelona	Spain	2015	Located outdoors on the premises of the church.	
	Centenary House & Calder Fountain Lifehouse (Salvation Army)	Belfast	United Kingdom		Located outdoors.	
	Holy Magdalena Church	Bruges	Belgium		Located outdoors on the premises of the church.	
	Christ Church Cathedral	Dublin	Ireland	2015	Located outdoors on the premises of the cathedral. The Dublin sculpture was the first erected outside of North America.	
	Badia Fiorentina	Florence	Italy	2019		
	Sanctuary of Fátima	Fátima	Portugal	2023	Located inside of the sanctuary	
	St George's Tron Church	Glasgow	United Kingdom	2017	Located outdoors on the premises of the church.	
	Church of Our Lady and Saint Nicholas	Liverpool	United Kingdom	2019	Located outdoors on the premises of the church.	
	Church of the Immaculate Conception, Farm Street	London	United Kingdom	2018	Located inside the church.	
	Almudena Cathedral	Madrid	Spain	2016	Located outdoors on the premises of the cathedral.	
	St Ann's Church	Manchester	United Kingdom	2018	Located outdoors on the premises of the church.	
	St. Boniface's Abbey	Munich	Germany	2022	Located outdoors on the premises of the abbey.	
	Community of Sant'Egidio headquarters	Rome	Italy	2018	Located outside.	
	Dicastery for the Service of Charity offices	Vatican City	Vatican City	2016	Located outside at the entrance of the office. Temporarily relocated to Sant'Egidio Courtyard for Holy Week in 2016.	
	Capuchin monastery	Warsaw	Poland	2021	Located outdoors	

== See also ==
- Depiction of Jesus
- Homelessness in popular culture
- List of statues of Jesus
