= Jean Tharaud =

French writer (1877–1952)

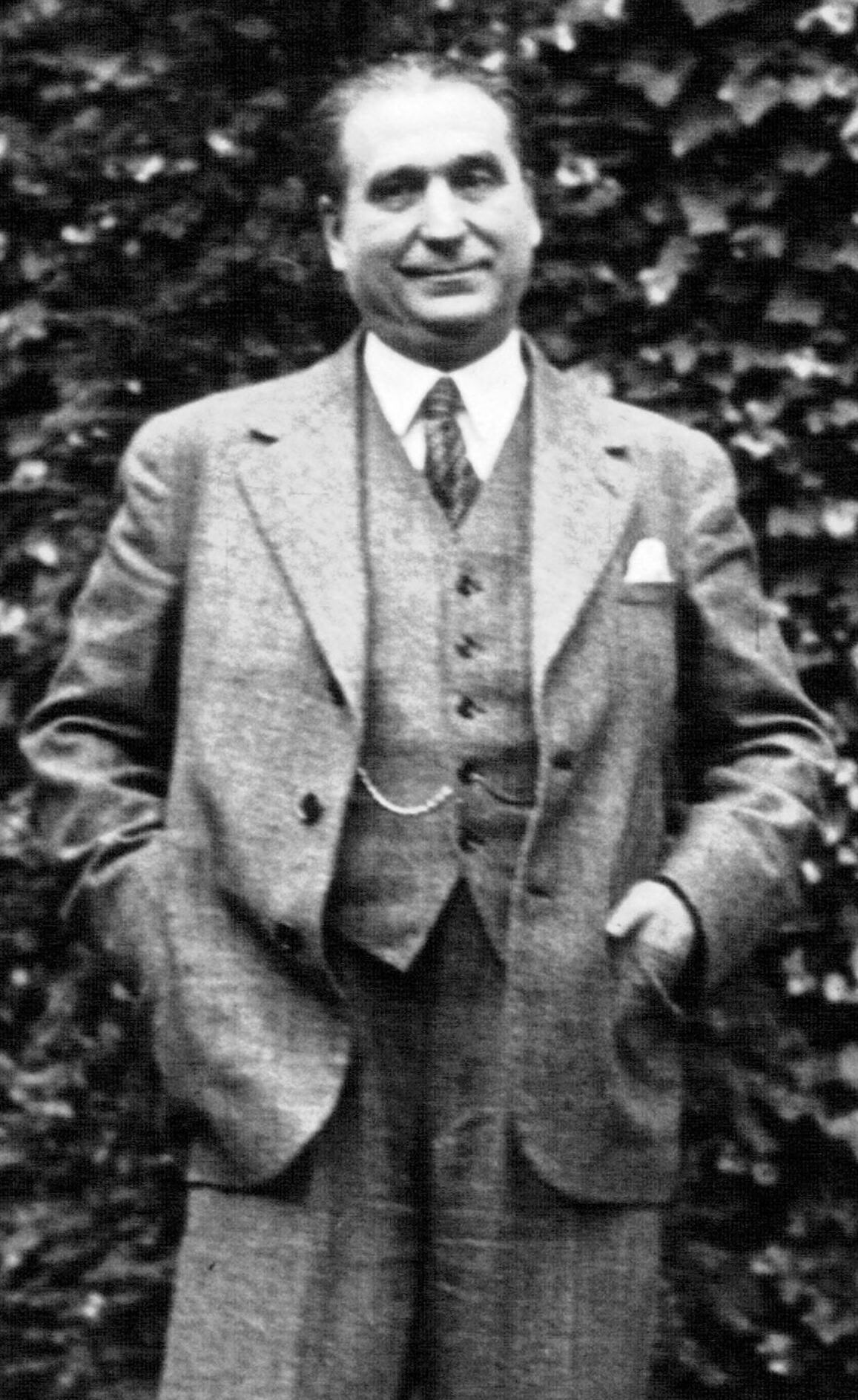
- Jean Tharaud in 1932
- Born: 9 May 1874
- Occupations: Journalist; novelist

Jean Tharaud (9 May 1877 – 8 April 1952) was a French writer.

== Biography ==
Jean Tharaud, along with Jérôme Tharaud (1874-1953), his brother, were born at Saint-Junien in the Haute-Vienne, but spent their youth at Angoulême.

They left their native Limousin at the end of the 1890s to establish themselves in Paris. "Tied to Charles Péguy, whom they followed from the time of the Dreyfus Affair and the Cahiers de la Quinzaine, they soon placed themselves under the patronage of Maurice Barrès (from 1904 onwards), and became his secretaries. The prix Goncourt they obtained in 1906 for [their novel] Dingley, l'illustre écrivain, opened the doors of fame to them.

For fifty years, the two brothers wrote novels collaboratively, always signing their works with both their names.

After the First World War, the left the editor Émile-Paul for the great house of Plon-Nourrit who offered them exceptional conditions, including 20% royalties, and they became the house's flagship authors. Their great commercial successes in France made necessary the translation of their books in foreign languages throughout Europe and the United States.

On February 6, 1930, Jean Tharaud, while driving his car, accidentally capsized the writer Auguste Dorchain who was going down the rue Garancière. On the 12th of May of the following year, he was acquitted for that deadly accident.

Indefatigable travelers, they toured numerous countries, Palestine, Ottoman Syria, Iran, Morocco, Romania, Germany (in 1933), Italy (in 1938), Indochina, Ethiopia... and brought back from their voyages material for their journalism, novels or works claiming to be historical or sociological.

In 1935, Jean Tharaud became president of the Académie des Sciences Morales des Lettres et des Arts at Versailles.

The Tharaud brothers were both elected to the Académie Française. The election (December 1st, 1938) of Jérôme Tharaud before the war posed a question of conscience to the academicians: the writer, in fact, was only "half of a duo of authors" and one could not elect two people to the same seat. Jérôme having been elected alone in 1938, the Second World War and the Occupation delayed the election of Jean. After the Liberation, he was, with Ernest Seillière, René Grousset, Octave Aubry et Robert d'Harcourt, one of the five people elected on February 14, 1946 to the Académie française during the first election of that year, which aimed to fill the numerous places left vacant by the period of the Occupation. He was received on December 12, 1946 by Louis Madelin to the seat of Louis Bertrand.

The brothers' very dated work is marked by a spirit of conformism to the values of the time and notably by nationalism, racism, and antisemitism (cf. in L'Ombre de la Croix, the description of the hands of Jews: "... long nervous hands... Each one of these long thin fingers, ending in black nails... plunged themselves feverishly in the beards, to search for a louse or an idea"; the journalist René Johannet writes in regards to this work that "It's the most terrible antisemitic novel that I know"; or the chapter « Un ghetto marocain » in their 1920 work Marrakech where the mellah is represented as "one of the most frightful places in the world"; or when, speaking of Montaigne to the editor Édouard Champion, they called him ironically "l’excellent Judéo-Bordelais"; in La Rose de Sâron, they affirm that "misery is a natural state to Israel."

The historian Michel Leymarie evokes the "Jewish vein" that the Tharaud brother never ceased to exploit in an "obsessional" way (everywhere they went, they sought out the ghetto), particularly after the Great War, through novelistic, historical, and journalistic writings et historique whose "indubitably antisemitic" message made them a great success in the Revue des Deux Mondes and the Maurrasian Revue universelle. Léon Daudet praised the Tharauds as making themselves "the adepts of a theory of Jewish conspiracy which enlists them in the extreme right"; "From being subjects of astonishment or mockery, the Jews then became for our authors subjects of concern, a danger for the West."

The poet André Spire, who advised the brothers before their travel to Jerusalem, said that he had "sniffed out their latent antisemitism" and that he sensed that what attracted them to Jewish subjects was "neither the taste for justice, nor the hatred of the executioners, nor pity for the victims, but the cold curiosity of the reporter, of the traveler for the picturesque of the most atavistic, trampled Judaism, for the most excluded, corralled Judaism of the ghettoes."

Jean Tharaud is buried at the cimetière Saint-Louis in Versailles.

His wife, Hélène (née Vasseur), born at Épernay on October 19, 1910, died at Versailles on April 12, 1989.

== Works ==
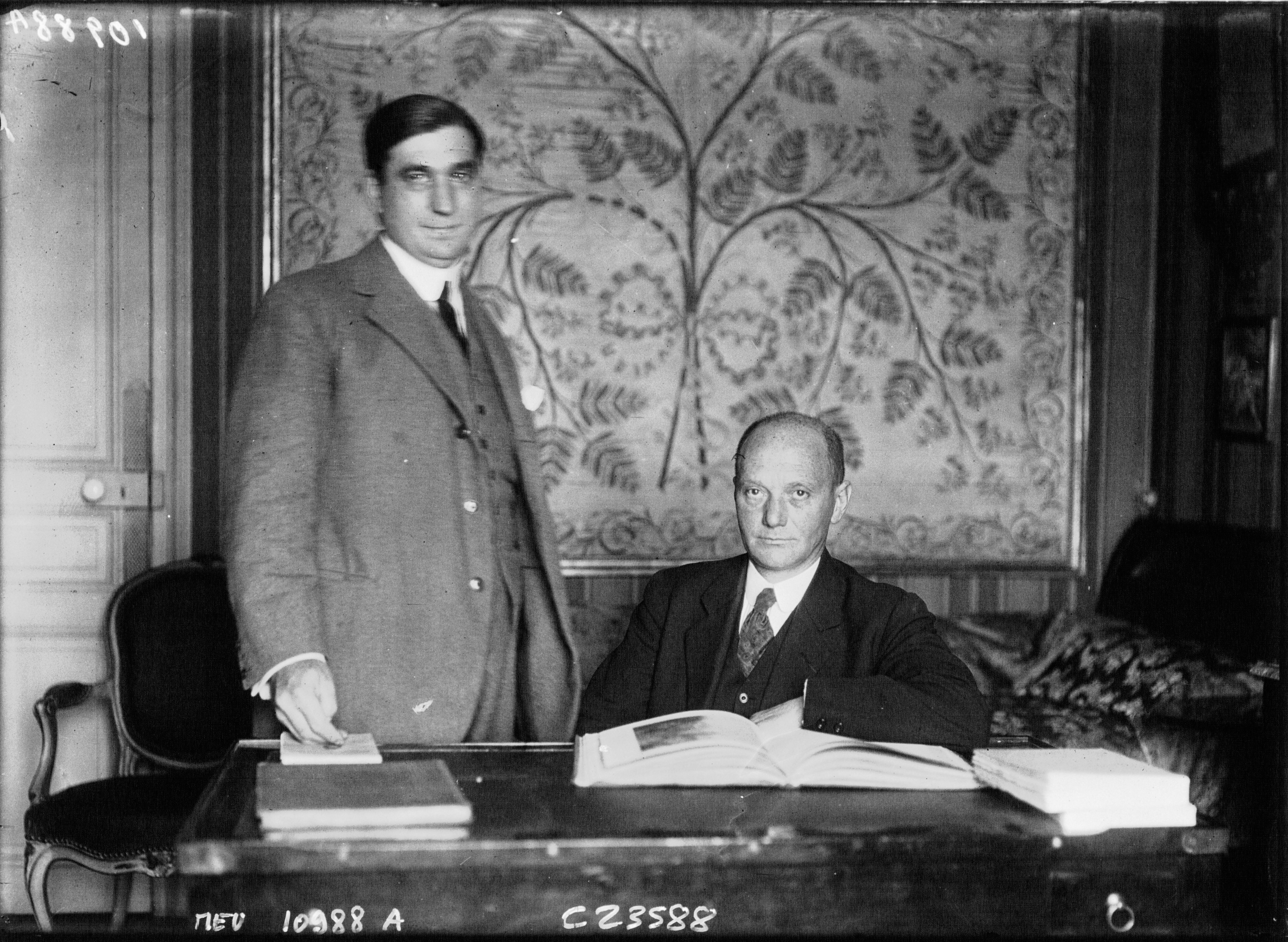
Jean & Jérôme Tharaud in 1923

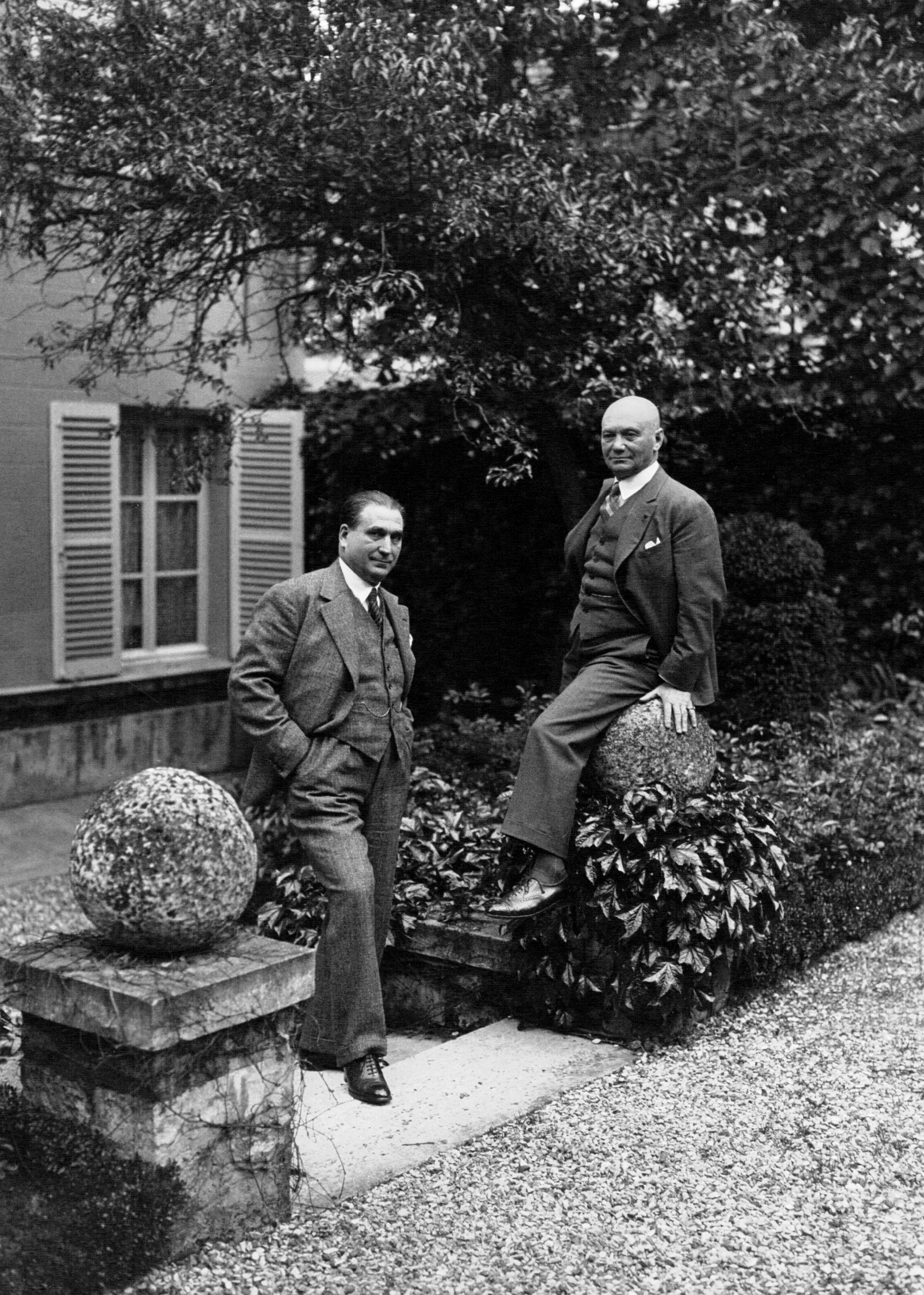
Brothers Tharaud in 1932

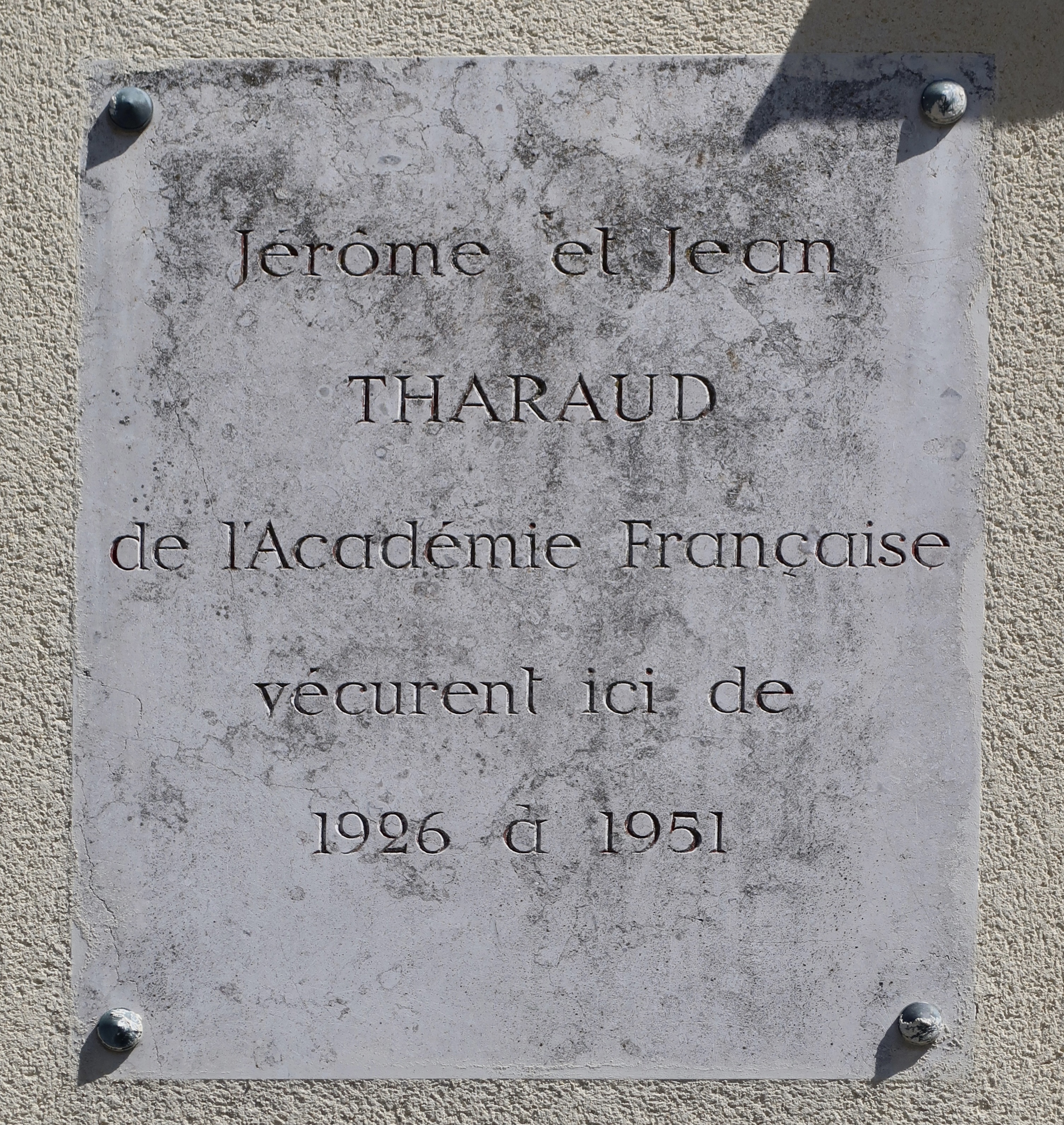
Wall plaque 93 rue Royale in Versailles, where he lives with his brother between 1926 and 1951

Books co-written with his brother Jérôme

- Le Coltineur débile (1898)
- La Lumière (1900)
- Dingley, l'illustre écrivain (1902, prix Goncourt en 1906)
- Les Hobereaux (1904)
- L'Ami de l'ordre (1905)
- Les Frères ennemis (1906)
- Bar-Cochebas (1907), Cahiers de la Quinzaine
- Déroulède (1909)
- La Maîtresse servante (1911)
- La Tragédie de Ravaillac (1913)
- La Mort de Déroulède (1914)
- L’Ombre de la croix, Emile-Paul, 1917; grand succès réédité par Plon en 1920, Société du Livre d'art/Imprimerie Nationale (édition de luxe illustrée par Henry Cheffer) en 1924, Grasset en 1929, Lapina (édition de luxe illustrée par Franck Brangwyn) et Mornay (édition de luxe illustrée par Aizik Feder) en 1931.L'Ombre de la croix (1917).
- Rabat, ou les heures marocaines (1918)
- Une relève (1919)
- Marrakech ou les seigneurs de l'Atlas (1920)
- Un Royaume de Dieu (1920), Revue des Deux Mondes puis Plon (87 200 exemplaires)
- Quand Israël est roi (1921), Revue des Deux Mondes (feuilleton intitulé Bolchevistes de Hongrie) puis dédié à Maurice Barrès, chez Plon (101 000 exemplaires)
- La Fête arabe (1922)
- L'invitation au voyage (1922)
- La randonnée de Samba Diouf (1922)
- La Maison des Mirabeau (1923)
- Le Chemin de Damas (1923)
- L'An prochain à Jérusalem ! (1924), Revue des Deux Mondes puis Plon (106 000 exemplaires)
- Rendez-vous espagnols (1925)
- Un royaume de Dieu (1925)
- Causerie sur Israël (1926)
- Notre cher Péguy (1926)
- La Semaine sainte à Séville (1927)
- Petite Histoire des Juifs (1927), Revue Universelle puis Plon
- En Bretagne (1927)
- Mes années chez Barrès (1928)
- La Reine de Palmyre (1928)
- La Chronique des frères ennemis (1929)
- La Rose de Sâron (1929) (plus de 76 000 exemplaires)
- Fès ou les bourgeois de l'Islam (1930)
- L'Empereur, le philosophe et l'évêque (1930)
- L'Oiseau d'or (1931)
- Paris-Saïgon dans l'azur (1932)
- La Fin des Habsbourg (1933)
- Quand Israël n'est plus roi, (1933), Plon
- La Jument errante (1933), Éditions de France
- Versailles (1934)
- Vienne la rouge (1934)
- Les Mille et un jours de l'Islam I : Les cavaliers d'Allah (1935)
- Les Mille et un jours de l’Islam II : Les grains de la grenade (1938)
- Le Passant d’Éthiopie (1936)
- Cruelle Espagne (1937)
- L'Envoyé de l'Archange (1939)
- Les Mille et un jours de l’Islam III : Le rayon vert (1941)
- Contes de Notre Dame, Plon (1943)
- Le Miracle de Théophile, illustrations de Paul Charlemagne, éditions du Rocher, Monaco (1945)
- Fumées de Paris et d'ailleurs (1946)
- Vieille Perse et jeune Iran (1947)
- Les Enfants perdus (1948)
- Les Mille et un jours de l’Islam IV : La chaîne d'or (1950)
- La Double confidence (1951)

=== English traductions ===
- When Israël is king, translate by The Hon. Lady Whitehead, New York, Robert M. McBride Company, 1924 ; republication by Antelope Hill Publishing, 2024 ISBN 979-8892520072
- Next Year in Jerusalem, New York, Boni & Liveright, 1925.
- A Moroccan Trilogy: Marrakesh, Rabat and Fez, translate by Anthony Gladstone-Thompson, London, Eland Publishing, 320 p., 2021 ISBN 978-1780601625
