= Ernest Boiceau =

- Born: 30 November 1881; Lausanne, Vaud, Switzerland
- Died: 16 March 1950 (aged 68)
- Occupation: Designer

Ernest Boiceau (30 November 1881 – 16 March 1950), born in Lausanne, Switzerland, was a Swiss designer and decorator of the interwar period.

== Biography ==
Born in a family of bankers, Ernest Boiceau received training in Munich, then studied drawing, painting and architecture at the École des Beaux Arts in Paris. From 1900 to 1910, he traveled and painted landscapes and portraits.

Starting in the 1910s, Boiceau dedicated himself to embroidery, passementerie and upholstery in his workshop, rue des Moulins in Paris, working initially for fashion houses and theatre costume designers. In 1912 he collaborated with John Jacobson on a tapestry exhibited at the Galliera museum in Paris. At the beginning of the war, in 1914, he organised a branch of the Swiss committee to help Belgian refugees. In 1920, he opened a boutique on the Avenue de l'Opéra, by that time, his exquisitely refined work as an embroiderer had become renowned. He supplied embroidered, beaded or sequined theatrical costumes for various venues like the opera, the Comédie-Française' theater and Parisian revues such as the Folies Bergère or Moulin Rouge. He also worked for master couturiers like Edward Molyneux or Worth.

In 1924, he started creating objects and furniture in stately neoclassical style, and completed his first tapestry. In 1928, he opened a new office dedicated to interior decoration on rue Pierre Charron in Paris.

He patented the Point de Cornely, an embroidery stitch derived from Emile Cornely's research in 1865, and began to apply this technique to his own creations in 1924–1925. An article published in L'Art vivant in 1927 praised this technique enlivening artworks' surfaces.

His participation as a decorator in the Salon d'Automne in 1928 and 1929 brought him national and international recognition.

Until 1935, he created objects, lighting, furniture made of rare wood species such as macassar, amaranth, sycamore or arecaceae sometimes with ivory or ebony inlays, as well as sumptuous carpets woven and embellished with Point de Cornely.

Boiceau became very sought after, he then opened another shop on Avenue Matignon and decided to devote himself entirely to decoration. He deeded the embroidery workshop to his employees, who in turn created an embroidery and fashion accessories company named Felix and company.

He worked with designers and architects in vogue at the time such as Elsie de Wolfe, David Adler and his sister Frances Adler Elkins among others, offering his own designs created in rich and varied materials including colored glass, light colored leather and bronze.

Among Boiceau's distinguished clients were Princess Bibesco, B. Boutet de Monvel, Louis Cartier, Mrs.Fenwick, Harold Macmillan, Cécile Sorel, the two brothers writers Jérôme Tharaud and Jean Tharaud, Louise de Vilmorin, Mr. Wendel and Jean-Charles Worth.

Boiceau closed his business at the outbreak of World War II, and died in the Vallée de Chevreuse (Essonne), not far from Paris in 1950.

== Collection ==
- The Art Institute of Chicago : 1920/25 wall hanging.
- Cooper Hewitt, Smithsonian Design Museum.

== Bibliography ==
- E Boiceau : London, Pavilion of Art & Design, Galerie Willy Huybrechts, October 13 – 17, 2010, Paris : Galerie Willy Huybrechts, 2010
- Philippe Julian, Les années'20 revues dans les années'70 chez Yves Saint Laurent, id., p. 105.
- Joan Juliet Buck, Chez Yves Saint Laurent, id. p. 96–97, p. 98–99.
- John Richardson, The Art of Yves Saint Laurent, id., p. 170–171, p. 172–173.
- Laurence Benaïm, Yves Saint Laurent, id17.
- Ernest Boiceau, décorateur-créateur, catalogue d'exposition, Galerie Eric Philippe, Paris, 198218.
