= Human safari =

Human safari may refer to:

- Human zoo, a colonial practice of publicly displaying people
- Human safari (terror campaign), a Russian campaign against civilians in Kherson, Ukraine
- Sarajevo Safari, an alleged war tourism phenomenon during the siege of Sarajevo (1992–1996)
