= Dark tourism =

Tourism involving travel to sites associated with death and tragedy

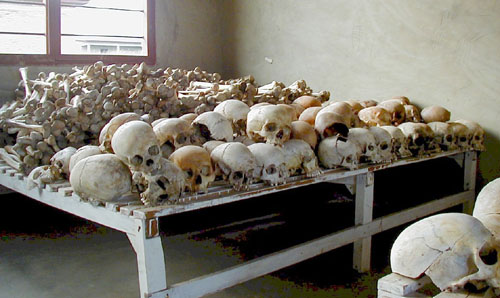
Murambi Technical School, where many of the murders in the Rwandan genocide took place, is now a genocide museum.

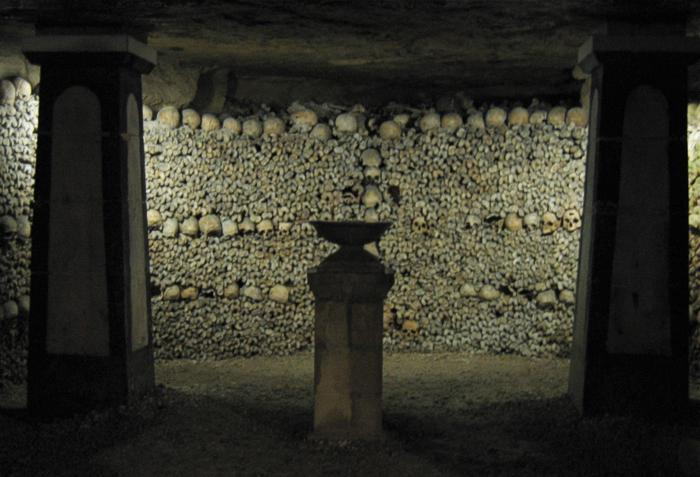
The Catacombs of Paris have become a popular site for thanatourism, and guided tours are frequently held in small areas of the complex of tunnels and chambers.

Dark tourism (also thanatourism, black tourism, morbid tourism, or grief tourism) has been defined as tourism involving travel to places historically associated with death and tragedy. More recently, it was suggested that the concept should also include reasons tourists visit that site, since the site's attributes alone may not make a visitor a "dark tourist". The main attraction to dark locations is their historical value rather than their associations with death and suffering. Holocaust tourism contains aspects of both dark tourism and heritage tourism.

== Field of study ==
While there is a long tradition of people visiting recent and ancient settings of death, such as travel to gladiator games in the Roman colosseum, attending public executions by decapitation, and visiting the catacombs, this practice has been studied academically only relatively recently.

Travel writers were the first to describe their tourism to deadly places. P. J. O'Rourke called his travel to Warsaw, Managua, and Belfast in 1988 'holidays in hell', or Chris Rojek talking about 'black-spot' tourism in 1993 or the 'milking the macabre'. Academic attention to the subject originated in Glasgow, Scotland: The term 'dark tourism' was coined in 1996 by Lennon and Foley, two faculty members of the Department of Hospitality, Tourism & Leisure Management at Glasgow Caledonian University, and the term 'thanatourism' was first mentioned by A. V. Seaton in 1996, then Professor of Tourism Marketing at the University of Strathclyde.

As of 2014, there have been many studies on definitions, labels, and subcategorizations, such as Holocaust tourism and slavery-heritage tourism, and the term continues to be molded outside academia by authors of travel literature. There is very little empirical research on the perspective of the dark tourist.

=== Hospitality and tourism ===
Scholars in this interdisciplinary field have examined many different aspects. Lennon and Foley expanded their original idea in their first book, deploring that "tact and taste do not prevail over economic considerations" and that the "blame for transgressions cannot lie solely on the shoulders of the proprietors, but also upon those of the tourists, for without their demand there would be no need to supply."

Whether a tourist attraction is educational or exploitative is determined by both its operators and its visitors. Tourism operators motivated by greed can "milk the macabre" or reexamine tragedies for a learning experience. Tourists pursuing dark tourism may desecrate the sites in question, though few case studies have investigated the impact of such actions. Author Chris Hedges criticized the "Alcatraz narrative as presented by the National Park Service" as "whitewashing" because it "ignores the savagery and injustice of America's system of mass incarceration". By omitting challenging details, the park service perpetuated a "Disneyfication" of the prison's history, Hedges argued.

== Example destinations ==
Destinations of dark tourism include castles and battlefields such as Culloden in Scotland and Bran Castle and Poienari Castle in Romania; former prisons such as Beaumaris Prison in Anglesey, Wales, and the Jack the Ripper exhibition in the London Dungeon; sites of natural disasters or man made disasters, such as Hiroshima Peace Memorial Park in Japan, Chernobyl in Ukraine and Ground Zero in New York. It also includes sites of human atrocities, murders, and genocide, such as the former German Auschwitz concentration camp in Poland, the Nanjing Massacre Memorial Hall in China, the Tuol Sleng Genocide Museum in Cambodia; the sites of the Jeju uprising in South Korea, and the Spirit Lake Internment Camp Centre near La Ferme, Quebec (an example of Canada's internment operations of 1914–1920). After the Broken Arrow murders, the home of the Bever family became a center for dark tourism by ghost hunters, urban legend seekers, teenagers, trespassers and vandals.

In Iraq, Saddam Hussein's former palaces have become a place of attraction for tourists. Saddam's "spiderhole," in which he hid prior to his capture by American forces, briefly became a tourist attraction, prompting the U.S. Marines to seal it with concrete.

In Bali, Indonesia, "death and funeral rites have become commodified for tourism... where enterprising businesses begin arranging tourist vans and sell tickets as soon as they hear someone is dying." In the U.S., visitors can tour the Holocaust Memorial Museum in Washington, D.C., "with an identity card which matches their age and gender with that of a name and photo of a real holocaust victim. Against a backdrop of video interpretation portraying killing squads in action, the pseudo-Holocaust victim enters a personal ID into monitors as they wander around the attraction to discover how their real-life counterpart is faring." In Colombia, places associated with Pablo Escobar, the drug lord from the Medellín Cartel, became hotspots for dark tourism and Escobar-themed tours. In Medellín, visitors frequent Roberto Escobar's private museum centered on his infamous brother, the house where the cartel boss was killed, and La Catedral, the purpose-built prison where Escobar was briefly incarcerated. Another famous dark tourism locale is Escobar's Hacienda Nápoles estate, located between Bogotá and Medellín, near Puerto Triunfo.

== See also ==
- Dark Tourist (television series)
- Disaster tourism
- Slum tourism
- War tourism
- Sarajevo Safari
- Sarajevo Safari (film)
