= Jérôme Tharaud =

French writer (1874–1953)

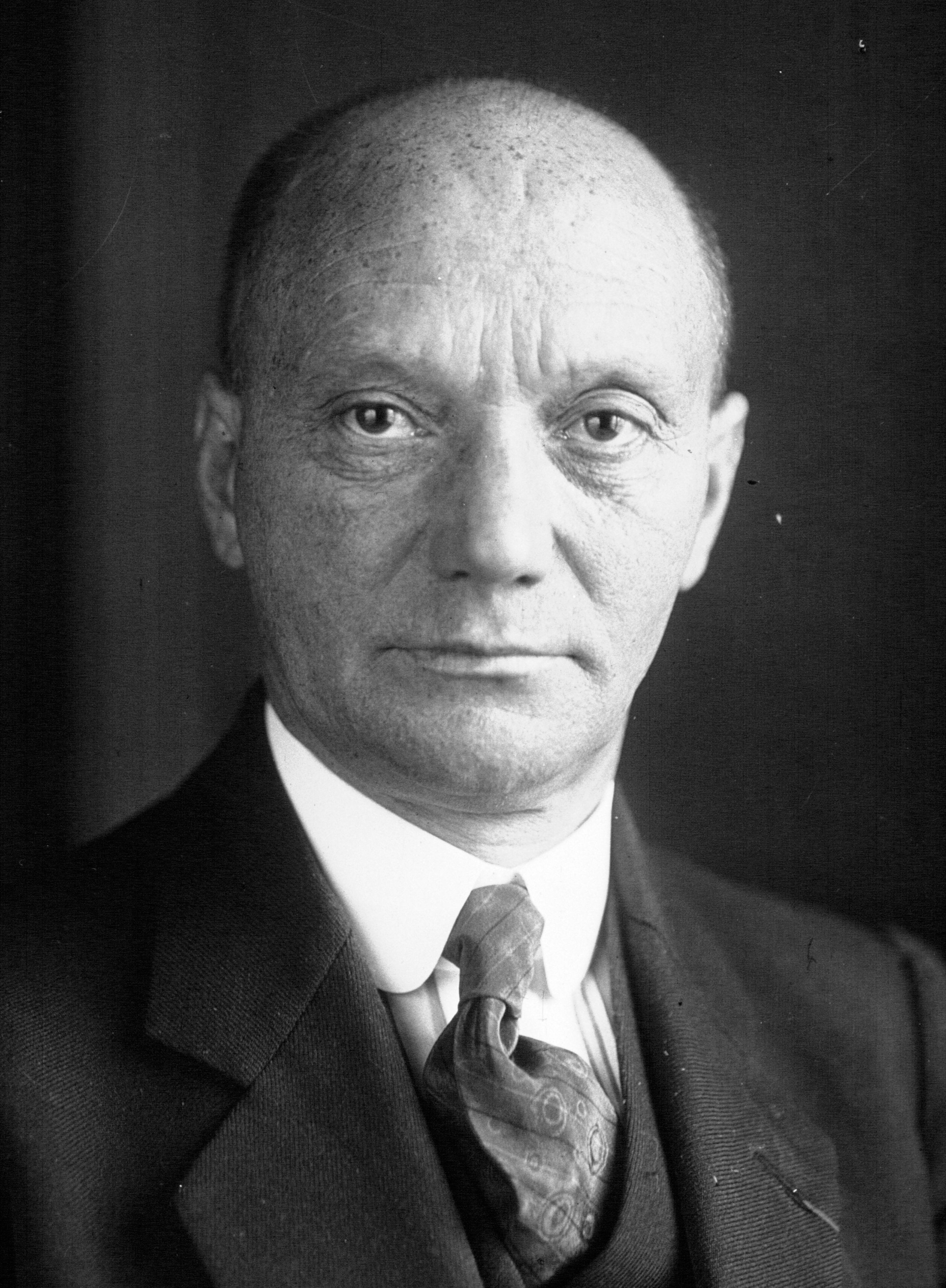
- Jérôme Tharaud in 1923
- Born: 18 May 1874
- Occupations: Journalist; novelist

Jérôme Tharaud (18 May 1874, Saint-Junien, Haute-Vienne – 28 January 1953, Varengeville-sur-Mer) was a French writer. He was awarded the Prix Goncourt in 1906, and was elected the fifteenth occupant of Académie française seat 31 in 1938.

== Biography ==
Jérôme Tharaud, along with Jean Tharaud (1874-1953), his brother, were born at Saint-Junien in the Haute-Vienne, but spent their youth at Angoulême.

They left their native Limousin at the end of the 1890s to establish themselves in Paris. "Tied to Charles Péguy, whom they followed from the time of the Dreyfus Affair and the Cahiers de la Quinzaine, they soon placed themselves under the patronage of Maurice Barrès (from 1904 onwards), and became his secretaries. The prix Goncourt they obtained in 1906 for [their novel] Dingley, l'illustre écrivain, opened the doors of fame to them.

For fifty years, the two brothers wrote novels collaboratively, always signing their works with both their names.

== Works ==
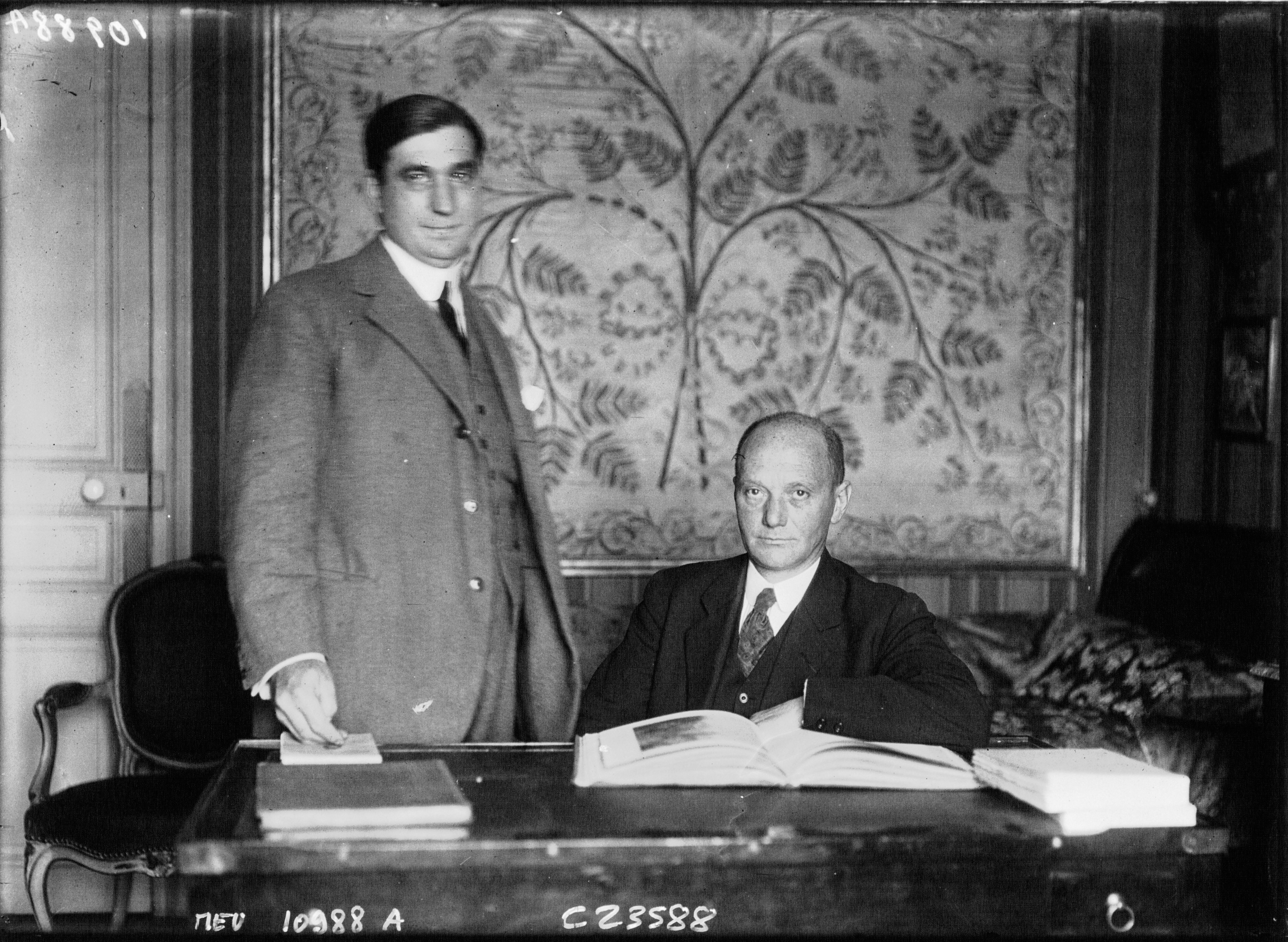
Jean & Jérôme Tharaud in 1923

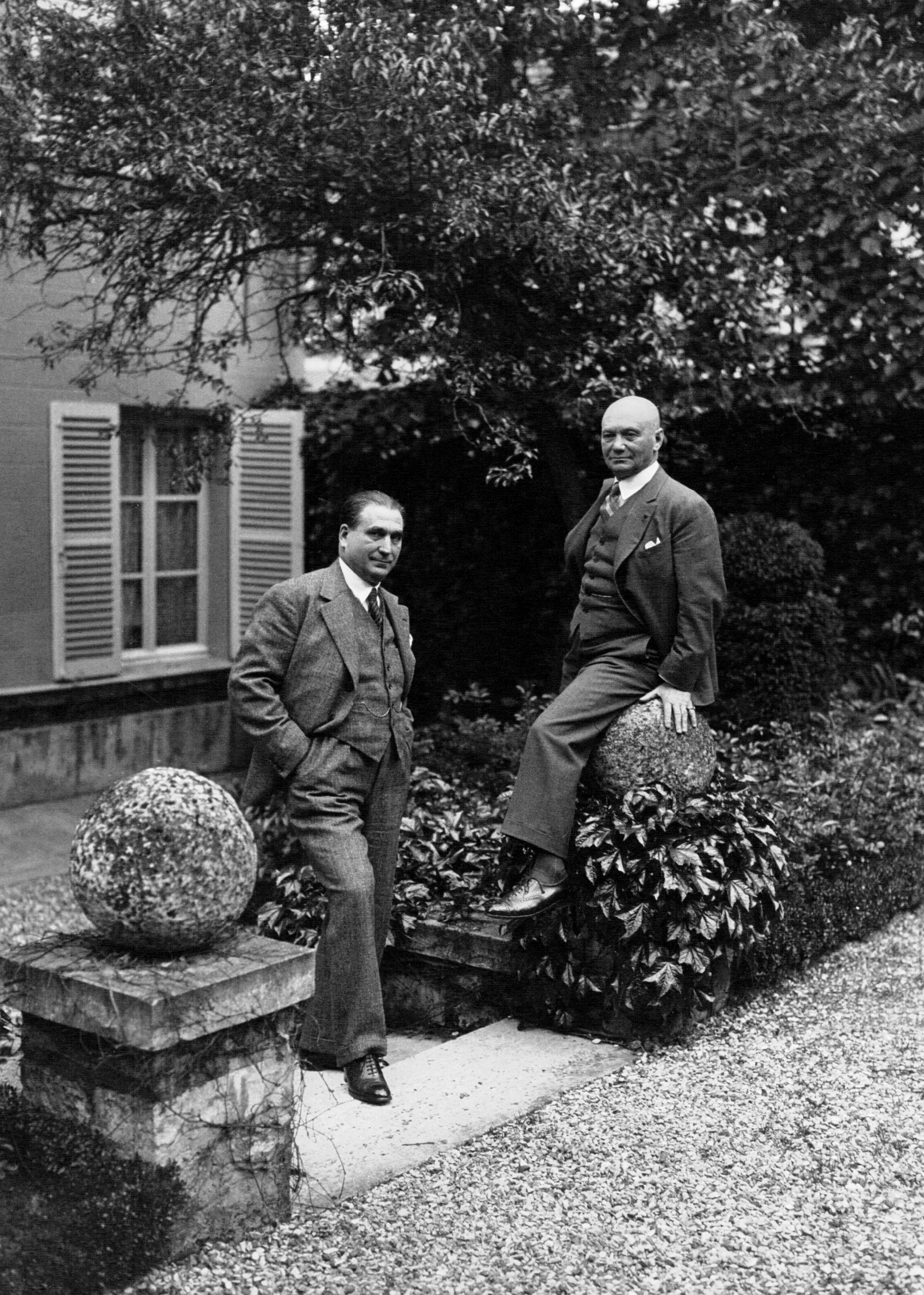
Brothers Tharaud in 1932

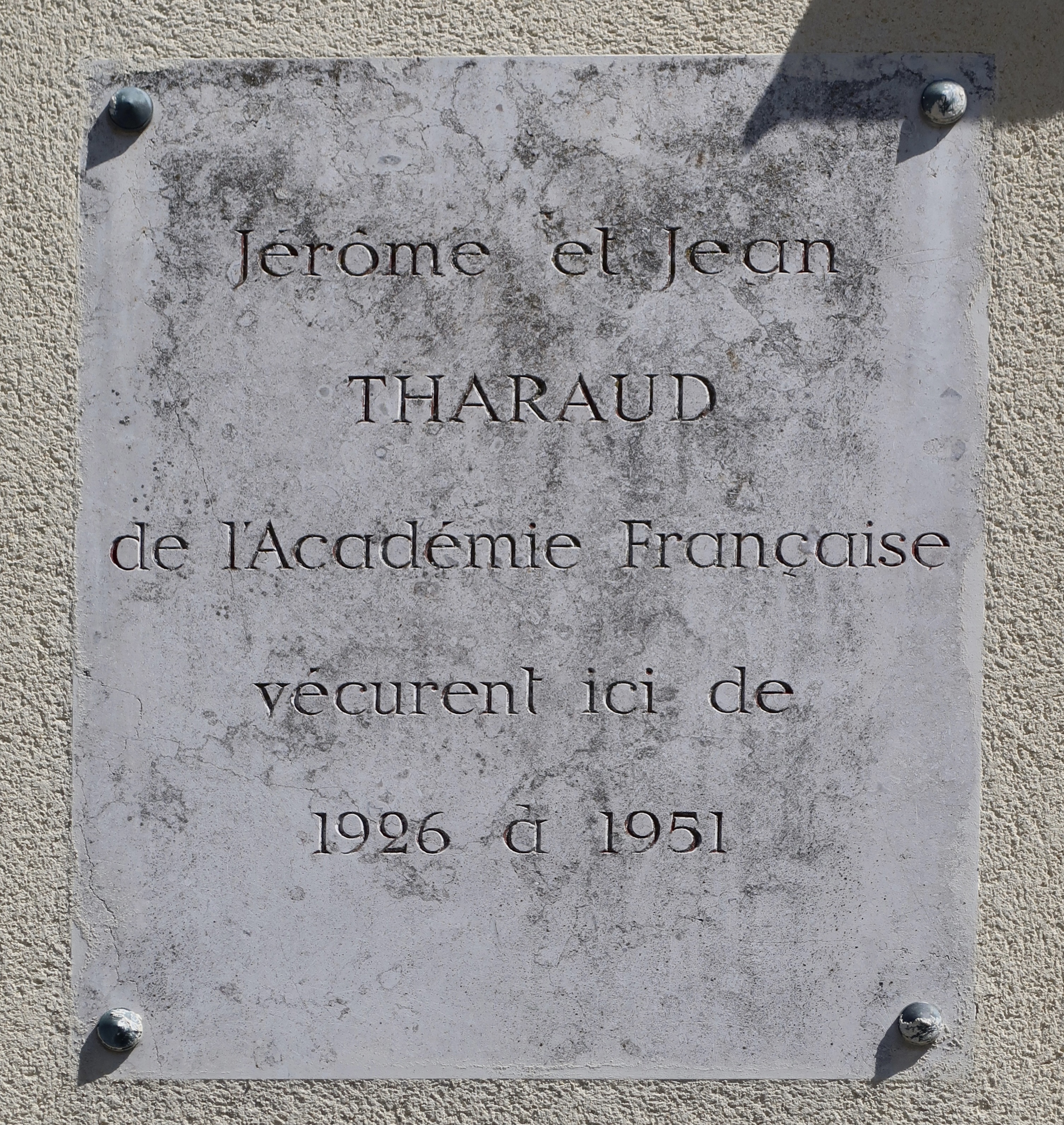
Wall plaque 93 rue Royale in Versailles, where he lives with his brother between 1926 and 1951

Books co-written with his brother Jérôme

- Le Coltineur débile (1898)
- La Lumière (1900)
- Dingley, l'illustre écrivain (1902, prix Goncourt en 1906)
- Les Hobereaux (1904)
- L'Ami de l'ordre (1905)
- Les Frères ennemis (1906)
- Bar-Cochebas (1907), Cahiers de la Quinzaine
- Déroulède (1909)
- La Maîtresse servante (1911)
- La Tragédie de Ravaillac (1913)
- La Mort de Déroulède (1914)
- L’Ombre de la croix, Emile-Paul, 1917; grand succès réédité par Plon en 1920, Société du Livre d'art/Imprimerie Nationale (édition de luxe illustrée par Henry Cheffer) en 1924, Grasset en 1929, Lapina (édition de luxe illustrée par Franck Brangwyn) et Mornay (édition de luxe illustrée par Aizik Feder) en 1931.L'Ombre de la croix (1917).
- Rabat, ou les heures marocaines (1918)
- Une relève (1919)
- Marrakech ou les seigneurs de l'Atlas (1920)
- Un Royaume de Dieu (1920), Revue des Deux Mondes puis Plon (87 200 exemplaires)
- Quand Israël est roi (1921), Revue des Deux Mondes (feuilleton intitulé Bolchevistes de Hongrie) puis dédié à Maurice Barrès, chez Plon (101 000 exemplaires)
- La Fête arabe (1922)
- L'invitation au voyage (1922)
- La randonnée de Samba Diouf (1922)
- La Maison des Mirabeau (1923)
- Le Chemin de Damas (1923)
- L'An prochain à Jérusalem ! (1924), Revue des Deux Mondes puis Plon (106 000 exemplaires)
- Rendez-vous espagnols (1925)
- Un royaume de Dieu (1925)
- Causerie sur Israël (1926)
- Notre cher Péguy (1926)
- La Semaine sainte à Séville (1927)
- Petite Histoire des Juifs (1927), Revue Universelle puis Plon
- En Bretagne (1927)
- Mes années chez Barrès (1928)
- La Reine de Palmyre (1928)
- La Chronique des frères ennemis (1929)
- La Rose de Sâron (1929) (plus de 76 000 exemplaires)
- Fès ou les bourgeois de l'Islam (1930)
- L'Empereur, le philosophe et l'évêque (1930)
- L'Oiseau d'or (1931)
- Paris-Saïgon dans l'azur (1932)
- La Fin des Habsbourg (1933)
- Quand Israël n'est plus roi, (1933), Plon
- La Jument errante (1933), Éditions de France
- Versailles (1934)
- Vienne la rouge (1934)
- Les Mille et un jours de l'Islam I : Les cavaliers d'Allah (1935)
- Les Mille et un jours de l’Islam II : Les grains de la grenade (1938)
- Le Passant d’Éthiopie (1936)
- Cruelle Espagne (1937)
- L'Envoyé de l'Archange (1939)
- Les Mille et un jours de l’Islam III : Le rayon vert (1941)
- Contes de Notre Dame, Plon (1943)
- Le Miracle de Théophile, illustrations de Paul Charlemagne, éditions du Rocher, Monaco (1945)
- Fumées de Paris et d'ailleurs (1946)
- Vieille Perse et jeune Iran (1947)
- Les Enfants perdus (1948)
- Les Mille et un jours de l’Islam IV : La chaîne d'or (1950)
- La Double confidence (1951)

=== English translations ===
- When Israël is king, translate by The Hon. Lady Whitehead, New York, Robert M. McBride Company, 1924; republication by Antelope Hill Publishing, 2024 ISBN 979-8892520072
- Next Year in Jerusalem, New York, Boni & Liveright, 1925.
- A Moroccan Trilogy: Marrakesh, Rabat and Fez, translate by Anthony Gladstone-Thompson, London, Eland Publishing, 320 p., 2021 ISBN 978-1780601625
