= Murder of Mary Bach =

Notable murder case in Northwest Ohio

- Location: Wood County, Ohio, United States

The murder of Mary Bach was a prominent murder case that took place in Wood County, Ohio on October 10, 1881, when Mary Bach was stabbed to death by her husband, Carl Bach. Paraphernalia associated with the murder, including a jar containing three of Bach’s severed fingers, are currently on display at the Wood County Museum in Bowling Green, Ohio, where they have become a point of interest for regional tourism. In recent years, scholars have cited the murder as a case of historic domestic violence and femicide, and the display of Bach’s fingers and other objects associated with her killing have prompted conversations surrounding museum ethics.

== Background ==
=== Early life and marriages ===
Mary Elizabeth Bach (née Myer) was born in Germany in the 1840s. As a child, her family immigrated to the United States. Little is known about Bach's life before the end of her first marriage, when her husband disappeared and was presumed dead while fighting for the Union Army in the Civil War. Shortly thereafter, Mary remarried Charles (Carl) Bach, another German immigrant. The couple moved to Wood County Ohio, and had three children: Carl Jr., Marie, and Catherine.

Due to the Panic of 1873, the Bach farm fell into economic hardship. This period was accompanied with an increase in Carl’s abusive behavior towards Mary. Because Mary financially assisted in purchasing the farm, Carl could not legally sell the property without her consent, which she refused to give. In response, Carl began beating his wife in an attempt to intimidate her into cooperation. Neighbors of the couple reported multiple instances of Carl voicing a desire to murder his wife. Carl was arrested in early fall of 1881, after Mary successfully convinced authorities that he posed a threat to her life. He was held in custody for eighteen days, and upon his release, Mary filed a peace warrant, or restraining order, against her husband, effectively banishing him from their farm. When Carl attempted to return home anyway, Mary locked him out of the house, forcing him to sleep in the barn. During this time, Mary attempted to secure a divorce.

=== Murder and aftermath ===
On October 10, 1881, Carl entered the family home and began a violent argument with Mary. After some time, he briefly left the home, returning with a corn knife. Carl Bach stabbed Mary 41 times, severing three fingers. Some investigators have speculated that the fingers were cut off when Mary raised her hand in an effort to defend herself. Carl turned himself in to local authorities the following morning. During their initial investigation of the crime scene, Mary’s fingers and the knife were both collected as evidence. The murder was allegedly witnessed by the eldest Bach child, Carl Jr.

=== Trial and execution of Carl Bach ===
Following his confession, Carl Bach was arrested and tried for murder. Transcripts of the trial, which are in the collection of the Wood County Museum, reveal that the defense argued that Carl only intended to wound Mary, not kill her, and that his actions were brought on by Mary inadequately performing her duties as a wife. Both Carl and their son Carl Jr. testified throughout the trial. Carl Jr.'s testimony confirmed his witnessing the murder and his father's role. Carl was found guilty, but issues with improper jury selection prompted a retrial, where he was once again convicted and sentenced to death by hanging. Carl Bach was executed on October 12, 1883. It was the second and final hanging to take place in Wood County. After the execution, Carl's noose was placed on display at the Wood County Courthouse, along with the murder weapon and the jar containing Mary's fingers.

== Domestic violence ==
Throughout both trials, the defense emphasized that Carl believed he was justified in his treatment of Mary, given the non-subservient nature of her actions. In his testimony, Carl referred to his wife as “a lazy animal” with a “loose mouth". Initial public response to the murder often ignored Mary entirely, instead focusing on her husband or the trauma her children experienced as witnesses to her murder. However, following the execution, media coverage shifted much of the blame onto Mary, pointing to her refusal to fulfill traditional spousal duties as justification for her murder.

Historians have cited Mary's marriage to and subsequent murder by Carl as an example of time-typical domestic violence. Public responses to the case highlight historic norms of victim-blaming in partner abuse. In an article published in the periodical The Public Historian, Dr. Rebecca Mancuso wrote “The collection of documents generated by the crime provide a deeper view into nineteenth-century domestic spaces and intimate relationships, realms that did not always bring to women the fulfillment and protection that prevailing rhetoric would suggest."

== Museum ethics ==
Mary Bach’s severed fingers were first on display at the Wood County Courthouse and then at the Wood County Museum. In recent years, they have sparked some ethical controversies among scholars regarding dark tourism and the public display of human remains. In the United States, laws such as the Native American Graves Protection and Repatriation Act limit the display of Indigenous remains and funerary objects. However, because Mary Bach was a German immigrant with no tribal affiliations, her fingers are not protected by any existing legislation, despite current museum ethics advising against the display of remains in most circumstances. One of such circumstances includes instances where institutions obtain the consent of the deceased’s next-of-kin. However, according to museum staff, efforts to locate and contact descendants of Mary Bach have been unsuccessful.

In 2015, the museum temporarily removed the jar from display for conservation efforts, including replacing the original alcohol that had been preserving Bach’s fingers since 1881. In 2020, the Bach murder exhibition underwent a redesign in collaboration with the domestic violence advocacy group, The Cocoon. The goals of the redesign included humanizing Mary Bach, and bringing attention to the issue of domestic violence in Wood County. In the redesign, which is now on permanent display, the jar is located under a labeled box, which can be lifted at visitor’s discretion to view the fingers.
