= Wood County Museum =

Coordinates: 41°21′03″N 83°37′01″W

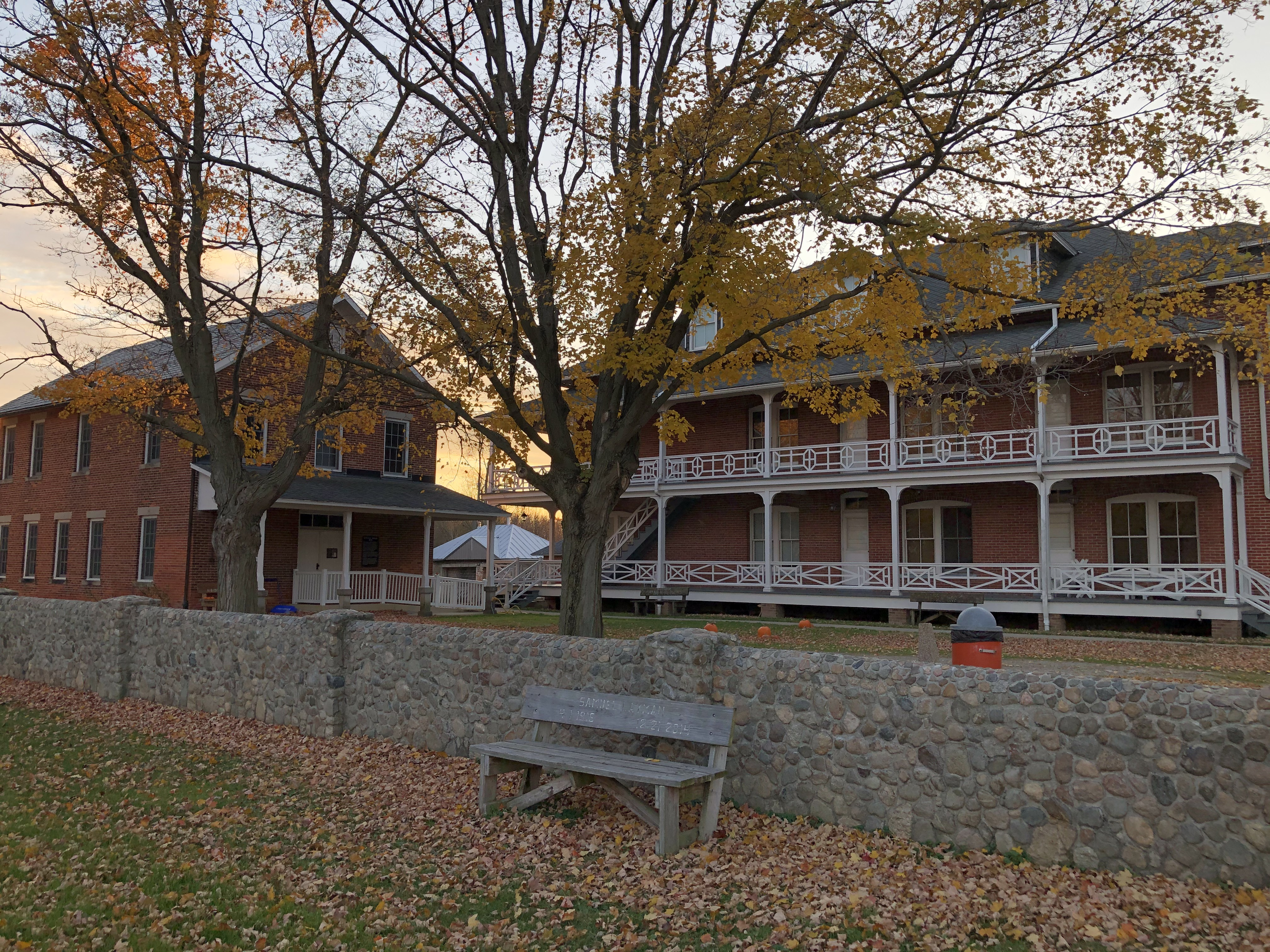
- Former name: Wood County Infirmary
- Established: 1975 (Museum)
- Location: 13660 County Home Road, Bowling Green, Ohio
- Type: History museum
- Website: woodcountyhistory.org

The Wood County Museum, located in Bowling Green, Ohio, is the original site of the Wood County Infirmary also known as the Wood County Home or the Poor Farm. This structure was the home to poor, mentally- ill, physically disabled and anyone in need of public assistance who were residents of Wood County.

== History ==
=== Infirmary ===
Wood County Infirmary
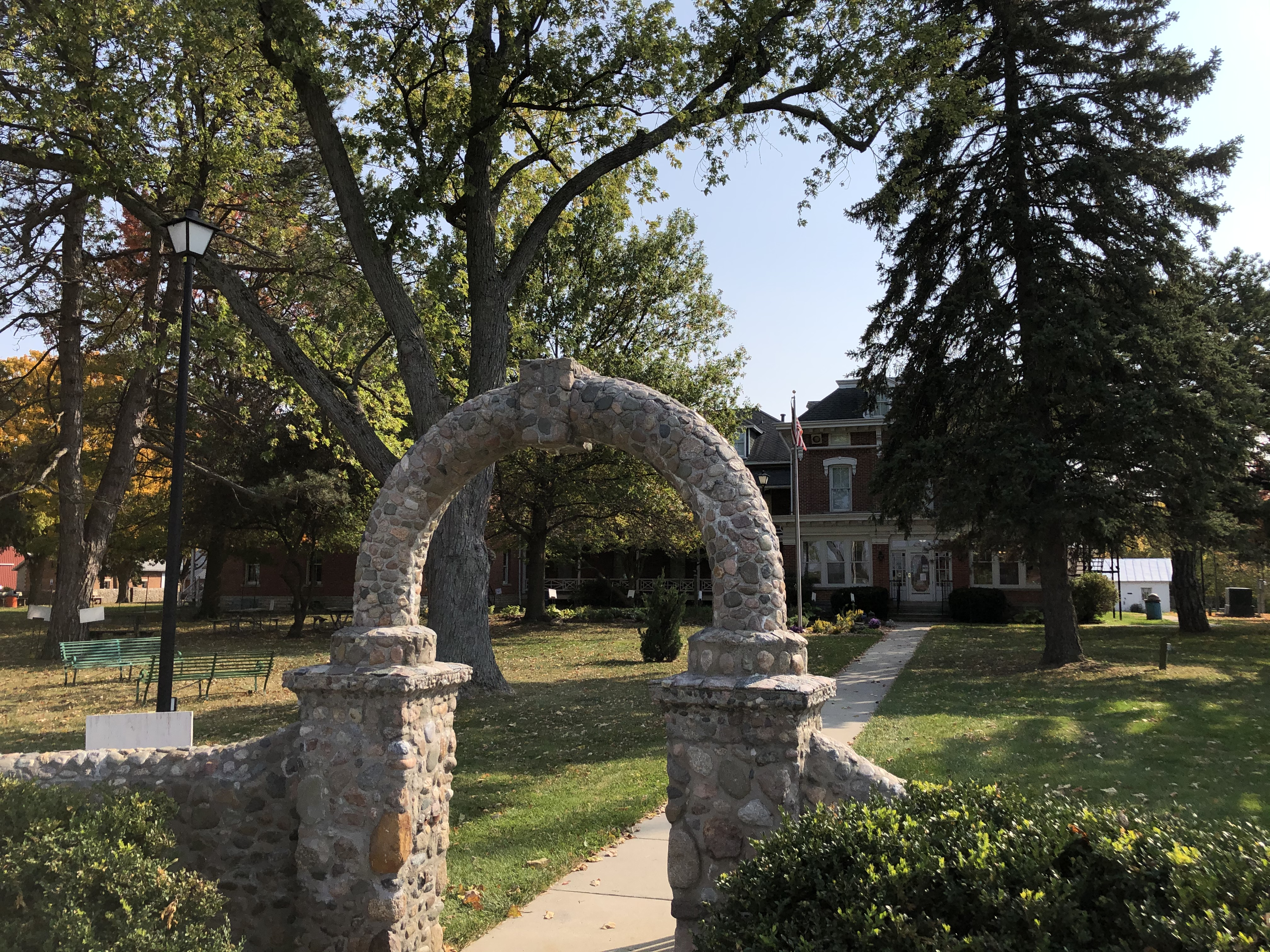

Geography
- Location: Bowling Green, Ohio, United States

History
- Constructed: 1868
- Opened: 1869
- Closed: 1971

Links
- Lists: Hospitals in Ohio

The main Infirmary building was built in 1868. Regulations by the State of Ohio prescribed a minimum standard of living in the construction, including minimum square footage per person, healthy food, and clean laundry, among other amenities. The Infirmary opened in 1869 where it also operated as a Poor Farm, giving it a degree of self sufficiency. The presence of an Infirmary in Bowling Green was a contributing factor that helped it gain status as County Seat instead of Perrysburg, Ohio.

In 1885 a Lunatic House was built on the grounds to house the mentally ill. Many of the first residents to live there had been moved from prior quarters in the waterlogged basement of a jail in Perrysburg, Ohio. Treatments prescribed included fresh air, Laudanum with Mercury and Alcohol added, and Herbal medicine. The Lunatic House ceased operations in the 1930s, when it was converted to serve as a hospital and dormitory for families during the Great Depression.

By 1898 the east and central wings of the infirmary were condemned and rebuilt. Oil wells built on the property as a result of the Ohio oil boom supplied heating and lighting oil until 1904, and the lack of heating in the East and Central wings was again an issue in 1979. In the 1920s the director of the Infirmary hand built a stone wall around the site. From 1935 on, the Infirmary shifted operations to be closer to a nursing home.

The Paupers Cemetery contains at least 355 burials. Removal of the headstones to make mowing the lawn easier made identification difficult.

=== Museum ===
In 1971 the Infirmary closed its doors and residents were moved to a new location. Between 1971 and 1974 the vacant building was heavily vandalized. Lyle Fletcher, a local historian and director of the city parks convinced the county commissioners to save the building. By spring 1975 the building opened as the Wood County Museum. As of 2018 the complex was one of the few preserved poor houses remaining in Ohio. The building was listed on the National Register of Historic Places in 1979.

The Museum was shown on WBGU-TV program Scenic Stop, which premiered December 6, 2012.

== Exhibits ==
The Museum is home to over 30 exhibits about this building's history and the social history of Wood County.

=== Outbuildings ===
There are several outbuildings, including a pest house to isolate men with communicable diseases such as scarlet fever and influenza, a hog barn and an ice house.

=== Mary Bach ===
The museum hosts the fingers of Mary Bach, who was murdered in October 1881. The fingers were kept as evidence and preserved in whisky before being transferred to a formalin solution, and later to a contemporary preservation scheme in 2015.

== Gallery ==
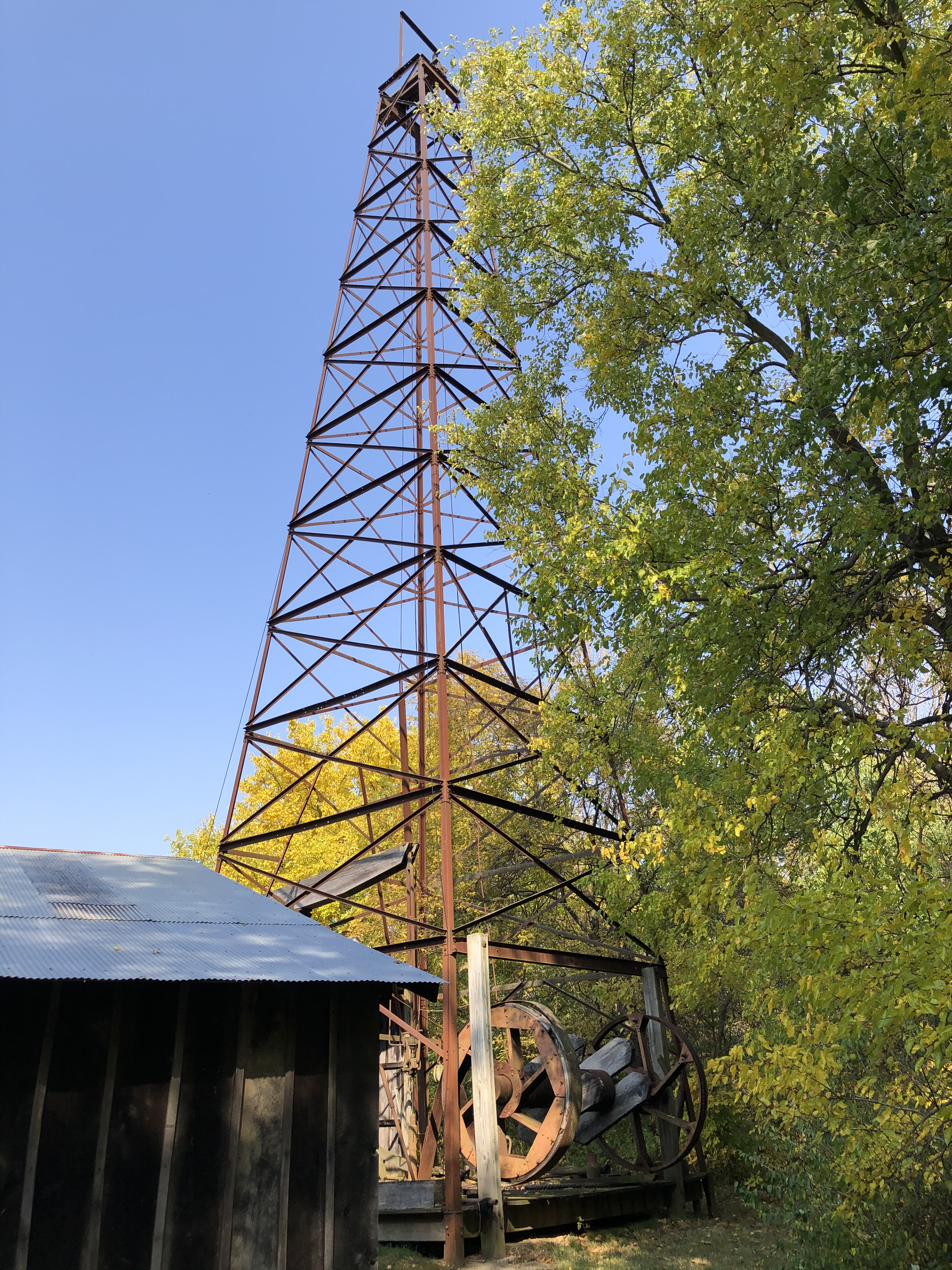
Oil Derrick

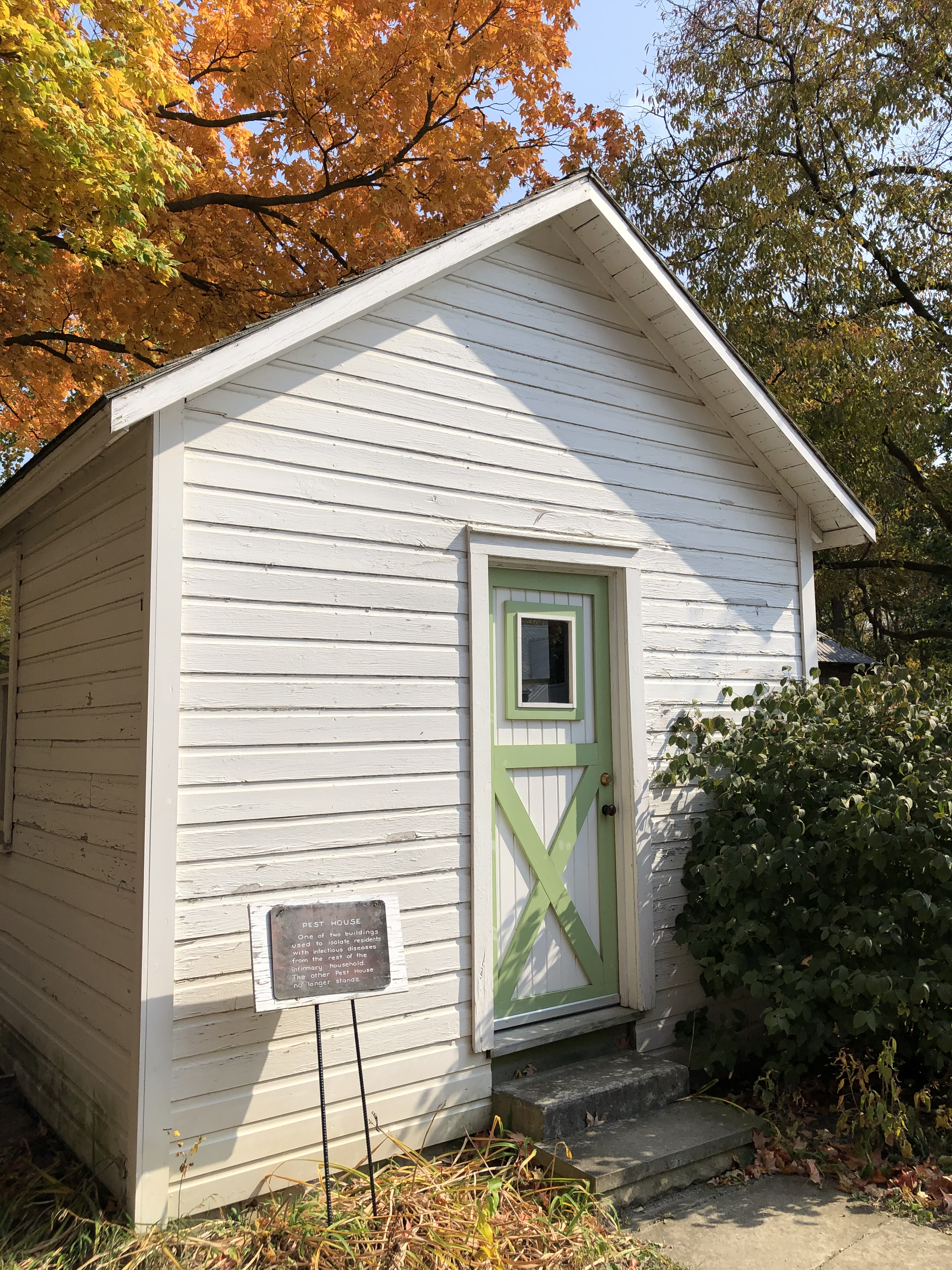
Pest House

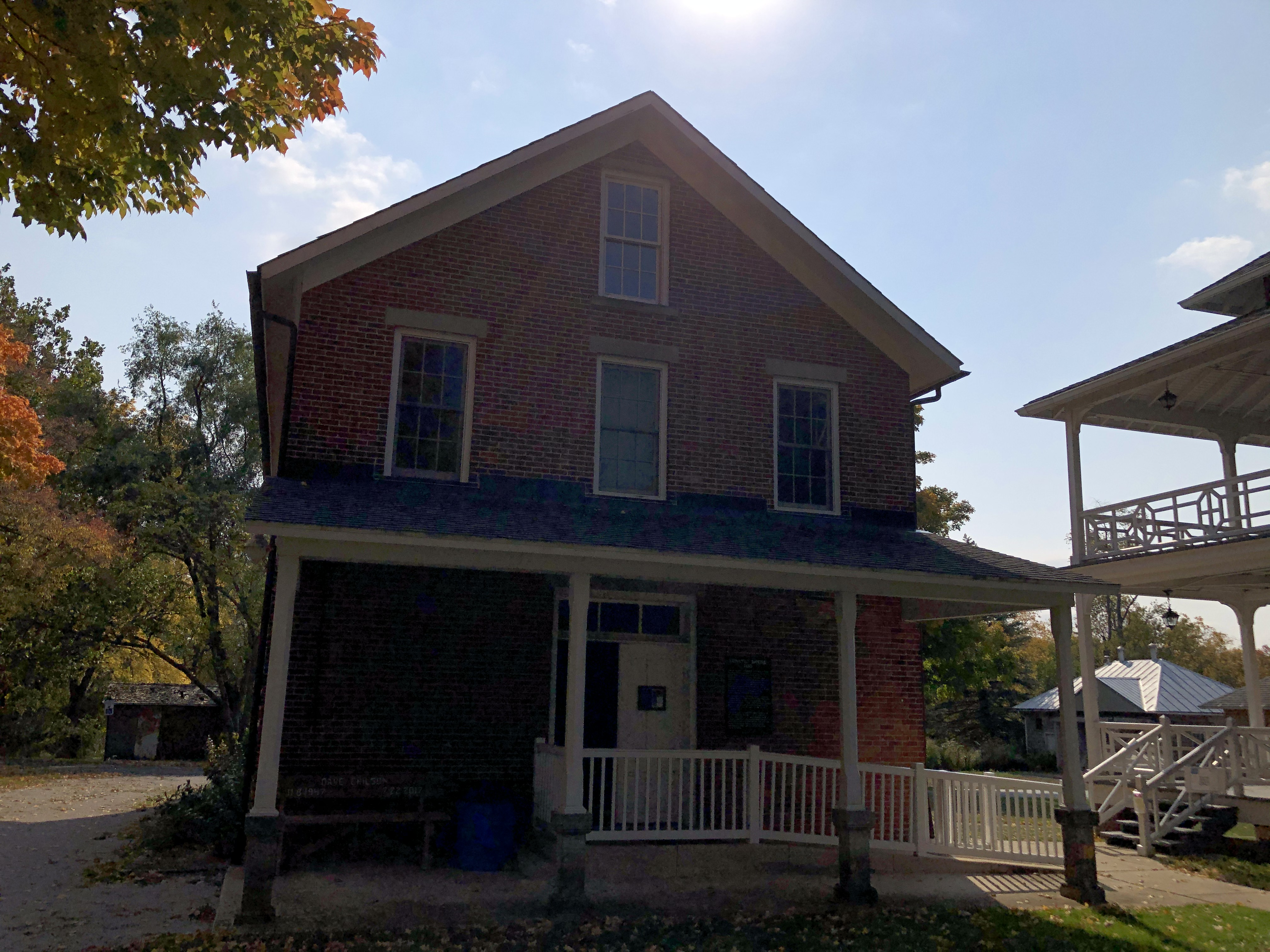
Lunatic House

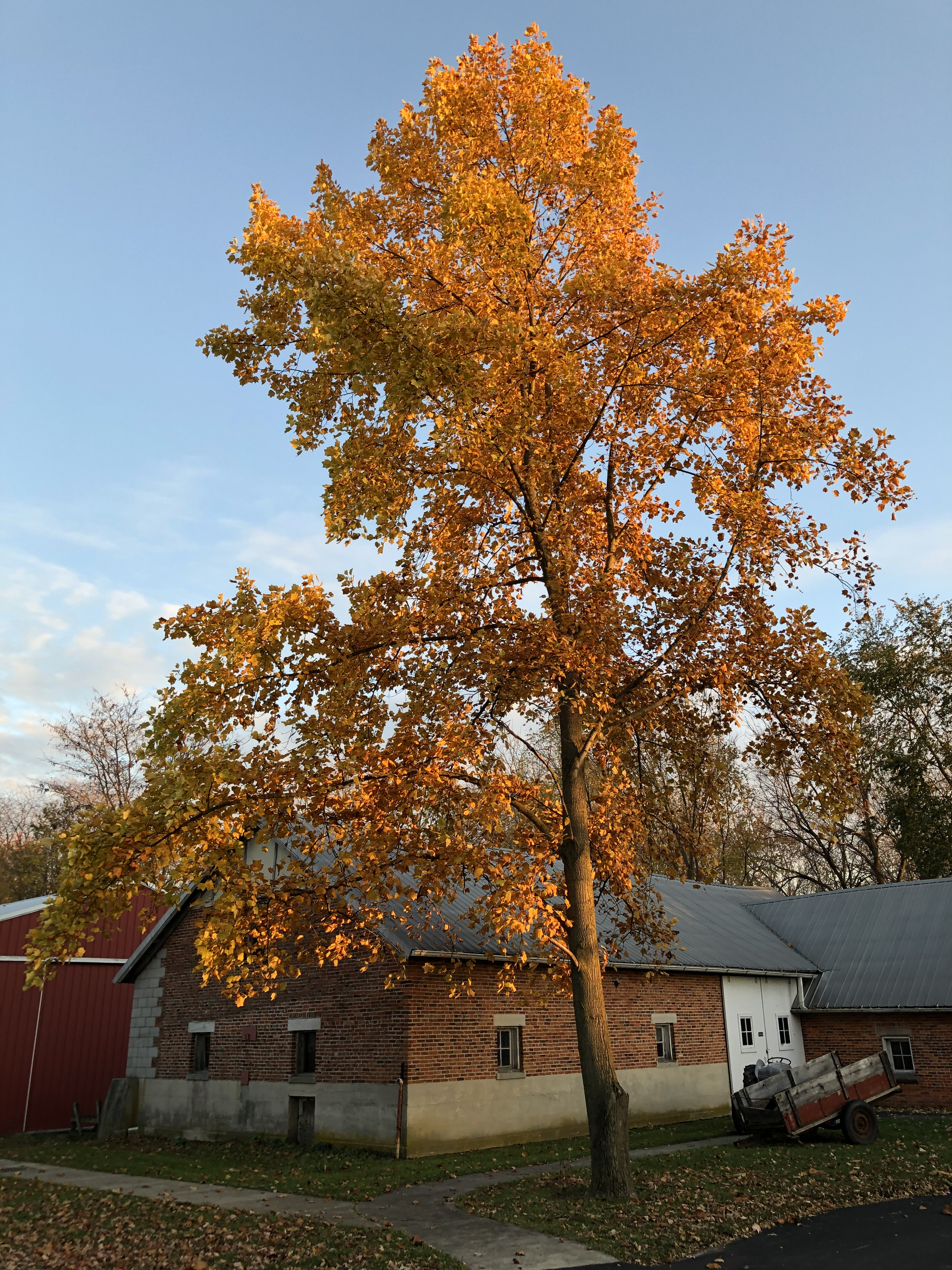
The hog barn

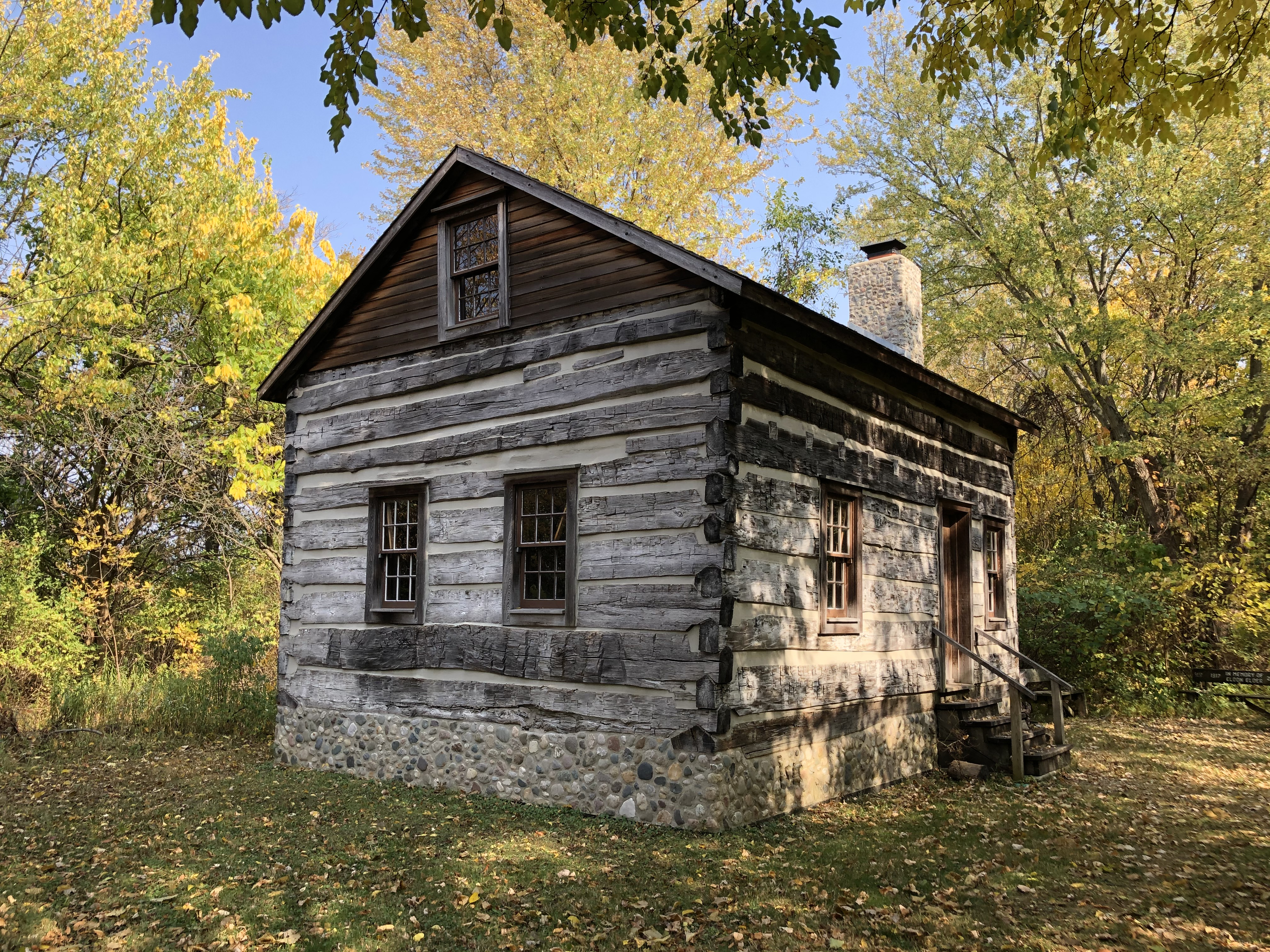
Log Cabin

== See also ==
- National Register of Historic Places listings in Wood County, Ohio
