= Jeremy Hambly =

American YouTuber and social commentator

- Born: April 1983 (age 43)
- Years active: 2012–present

YouTube information
- Channels: TheQuartering; UnsleevedMedia; Jeremy Hambly; Quartering Live; ClawStruck
- Subscribers: TheQuartering: 2.15 million; Jeremy Hambly: 335,000; UnsleevedMedia: 184,000; ClawStruck: 108,000; Quartering Live: 82,100; rcnightmare: 64,100
- Views: TheQuartering: 1.8 billion; Jeremy Hambly: 65 million; UnsleevedMedia: 40 million; ClawStruck: 19 million; Quartering Live: 14 million
- Last updated: May 12, 2026

Jeremy Hambly (born April 1983) is an American YouTuber and right-wing commentator. Hambly runs several YouTube channels, including ClawStruck, a channel about claw machines, Unsleeved Media, and TheQuartering, a channel which covers politics and pop culture.

Hambly was active within the Magic: The Gathering community until 2019. In February 2026, he returned to posting videos on his Unsleeved Media channel, where his content focused on pack-openings and unboxing videos.

== Career ==
Hambly founded ClawStruck, a YouTube channel and website about claw machines, in November 2014. Hambly was interviewed by Today show host Jeff Rossen, where Hambly explained that claw machines could be rigged to change the rate at which customers won rewards.

=== Magic: The Gathering ===
Hambly operated the channel Unsleeved Media, a Magic: The Gathering themed channel.

In 2017, Magic cosplayer Christine Spankle, along with other Magic content creators, alleged that they were harassed by Hambly's content. In response, Hambly accused Spankle of pushing a false narrative and said that he had been harassed, doxxed, and review bombed as a result. Hambly also said that he told his followers not to reach out to the subjects of his videos. Wizards of the Coast (WOTC) banned Hambly from all future Magic events. Critic Alexander Adams argued that the ban was due to his unpopularity among some fans and criticism of WOTC rather than a specific policy infraction.

On August 2, 2018, Hambly was attacked outside Gen Con, which Hambly attributed to his political beliefs. Hambly asked his followers to identify his attacker, and when he tweeted a photo of a man who he said matched his attacker's description, Hambly's followers posted links to his LinkedIn page, Twitter account, and employer. Gen Con banned Hambly for "targeted online bullying of attendees". In 2019, Hambly announced that he would be quitting Magic, saying "I was probably a little too spicy. Now, I stand by a lot of what I've said."

=== Politics ===
In 2015, Hambly, a self-described "anti-social justice warrior", created TheQuartering, a right-wing channel which covers politics and pop culture. The New York Times' Jamal Michel and Verity Ann Trott described Hambly's audience as reactionaries and incels, respectively. According to Christina Wurst, Hambly often used populist rhetoric and drew from and promoted conspiracy theories in his media criticism, such as his accusation that Disney and politicians were attempting to brainwash children through the use of critical race theory, "gender ideology", and diverse representation in children's entertainment.

In a video covering Gillette's ad We Believe: The Best Men Can Be, Hambly described the ad as anti-male and accused Gillette and YouTube of deleting downvotes. Negative comments on the ad deferred to Hambly as an authority figure or indicated that they were responding to a call-to-action from Hambly. In 2023, Hambly released a video criticizing an LGBTQ resource center in Kalamazoo, Michigan, resulting in hundreds of emails, calls, and messages to the center, which the center's director said were "[mostly] hate-filled, but some had veiled threats in them, and others were direct threats".

In response to progressive streamer Hasan Piker's ban from Twitch due to his use of the word "cracker", Hambly argued that progressives and leftists worked to redefine racial rhetoric to exclude discrimination against white individuals, while also saying that "cracker" caused little harm compared to other slurs. Scholars Aisha Powell and Dana Williams-Johnson argued that he undermined his own arguments by showing that "cracker" did not carry the same systemic consequences as other slurs.

In October 2023, during the Gaza war, social media accounts circulated a video of CNN journalists in Israel taking shelter whose audio was altered by a TheQuartering editor to add several explosion sound effects and a fake phone call between the journalists and the producer where the producer asked them to "look nice and scared". Hambly said that the audio alteration was meant to be satirical but maintained that the journalists were acting.

Hambly has made numerous anti-semitic comments- saying that Adolf Hitler “actually done some good things,” defended a January 6th rioter wearing a "Camp Auschwitz" hoodie, and joked about the Holocaust. In 2023, TheQuartering accepted a sponsorship from Antelope Hill Publishing, a white nationalist and neo-Nazi publishing company. Hambly hosted Republican gubernatorial candidate Tom Tiffany on his show and offered to help his campaign. This offer prompted the Democratic Party of Wisconsin to criticize Tiffany for associating with Hambly given his history of anti-semitic remarks.
