= Miles Routledge =

English author and war tourist (born 1999)

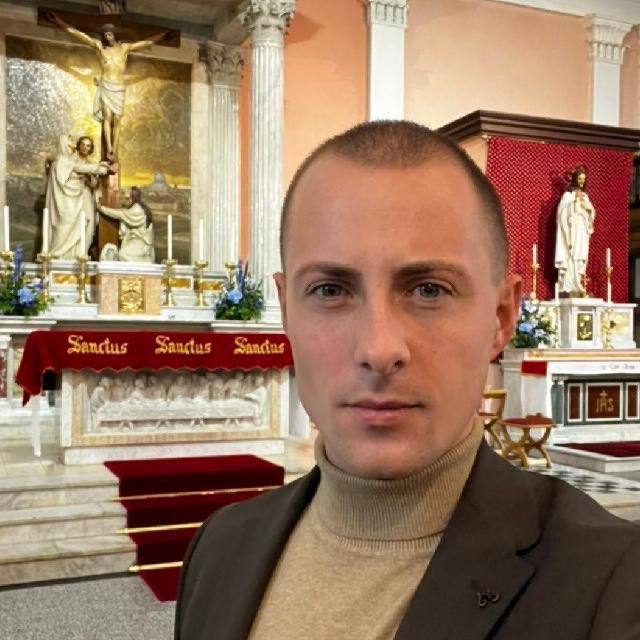
- Routledge in 2024
- Occupations: YouTuber; Author; Reseller

YouTube information
- Channel: Lord Miles
- Subscribers: 182,000
- Views: 6.5 million
- Last updated: 21 September 2026

Miles Routledge, or Lord Miles on social media, is an English far-right YouTuber and war tourist. He gained notoriety for being evacuated during the 2021 Fall of Kabul after travelling Afghanistan to engage in danger tourism.

== Early life ==
Routledge worked part-time as a hairdresser as a teenager. He studied physics at Loughborough University.

== 2021 trip to Afghanistan ==
In March 2021, he began planning a trip to Afghanistan.

On 13 August 2021 Routledge arrived in Kabul from Turkey, with a return flight scheduled for 19 August. Due to the ongoing Taliban offensive the FCDO had advised against all travel to the whole country, and urged British nationals in Afghanistan to leave immediately. On 15 August he told The Times that he had "accepted death".

The Taliban claimed victory in Afghanistan on the 16 August. On the same day, a spokesman for the Foreign, Commonwealth and Development Office of the United Kingdom said that they were "aware of [Routledge's] case" and were "attempting to reach the individual to offer assistance". On 17 August Routledge was evacuated to Dubai.

In November 2021 Routledge signed a publishing contract with Antelope Hill Publishing to recount his experience during the fall of Afghanistan. His book Lord Miles In Afghanistan was released December 2022.

== 2023 imprisonment by the Taliban ==
Routledge departed for a third holiday to Afghanistan in late February 2023, and was apprehended by the Taliban's General Directorate of Intelligence on 2 March 2023. The GDI also apprehended a volunteer medic named Kevin Cornwell and an unidentified hotel manager, both British citizens. Routledge was released from Taliban custody in October 2023.

== Political views ==
Routledge has made a number of comments on the social media platform X targeting Indians that have been considered racist, and has also joked about nuking India. After his AirPods were stolen and found in Pakistan, Routledge blamed Indians for stealing them, accusing them of being thieves and insulting them as 'cow worshippers'.

=== Restore Britain ===
Routledge is a known supporter of the far-right political party Restore Britain and was noted in April 2026 for having called another Restore supporter a "liberal" for wanting to deport millions of people from the UK, saying: "I have better solutions." When asked about the comments in relation to a post from the previous year calling for another "Hitler", Routledge replied in the affirmative, also declaring his belief that journalists should be imprisoned.

Routledge gave Restore £2500 to become a member of its Cromwell Club, a group designed "to support the movement's work [by] funding research, outreach, and strategic campaigns". The party told The Telegraph that they had refunded the amount amid publication of Routledge's comments praising Adolf Hitler and other antisemitic conspiracy theories.

== Bibliography ==
=== Books ===
- Routledge, Miles (2 December 2022). Lord Miles in Afghanistan. Antelope Hill Publishing. ISBN 978-1956887532. OCLC 1356508024.

== See also ==
- Otto Warmbier
- Florin Fodor
