= Holocaust tourism =

Tourism around destinations associated with The Holocaust

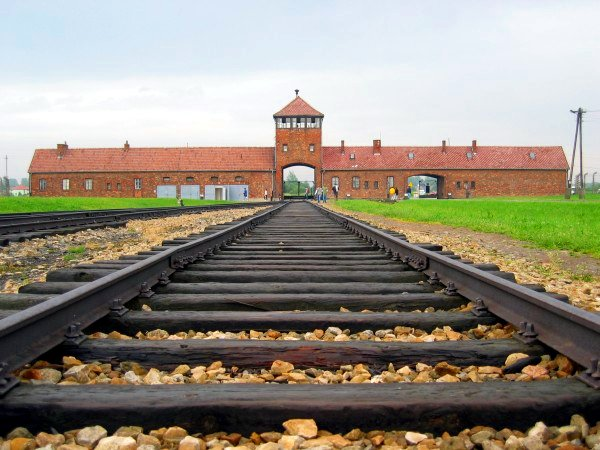
Main track of Auschwitz-Birkenau. Permanent exhibit at Auschwitz-Birkenau State Museum.

Holocaust tourism is tourism to destinations connected with the extermination of Jews during the Holocaust in World War II, including visits to sites of Jewish martyrology such as former Nazi death camps and concentration camps turned into state museums. It belongs to a category of the so-called 'roots tourism' usually across parts of Central Europe, or, more generally, the Western-style dark tourism to sites of death and disaster.

The term Holocaust, first used in the late 1950s, was derived from the Greek word holokauston meaning a completely burnt offering to God. It has come to symbolize the systematic extermination of approximately six million European Jews by Nazi Germany in occupied territories from 1933 to 1945. The term can also be applied to mean the estimated five to seven million non-Jewish victims who were murdered by the Nazis in the same time period.

== Dark tourism spectrum ==
The term 'dark tourism' was first coined in 1996. According to P. R. Stone, there is a dark tourism spectrum, which differentiates between the shades of the dark tourism:

darkest	darker	dark	light	lighter	lightest

The spectrum aids in identifying the intensity of both the framework of supply and the consumption. The darkest tourism is characterized by the following elements: education orientation, historic background, location authenticity in terms of relics (non-purposefulness), and limited tourism infrastructure. The objects of lightest tourism have mostly opposite features: entertainment orientation, commercial centralization, inauthenticity, commercial purposefulness, and higher level of tourism infrastructure. Professor William F. S. Miles stipulates that death and violent events – transmitted between generations through survivors and witnesses – are darker than other events. Miles also notes that the level of darkness of a tourist destination may partially depend on the family background of the prospective tourists.

Stone distinguishes seven dark suppliers, which create the dark tourism product and experience. The model of seven dark suppliers demonstrate dark tourism as multi-faceted phenomenon, with the extermination camp at Auschwitz-Birkenau conceivably the darkest in terms of influence. The Dark Camps of Genocide are sites where genocide and violence were actually perpetrated. All such sites belong to this category. Auschwitz was the largest of the Nazi death camps in World War II, and is at the top of this list. Holocaust sites usually depend on government's sponsorship. Among the seven dark suppliers are also war sites and battlefields (Dark Conflict Sites), places of remembrances (Dark Shrines), cemeteries of famous people (Dark Resting Places), prisons and courthouses (Dark Dungeons), exhibits associated with death and suffering (Dark Exhibitions), and finally, the tourist sites which emphasize entertainment (Dark Fun Factories).

== Postmemory and Jewish identity ==
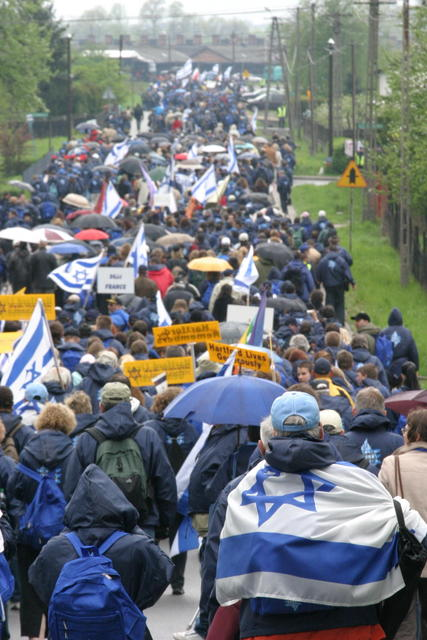
March of the Living from Auschwitz to Birkenau

Holocaust tourism sites are related to 'postmemory' as well as cultural identity, with postmemory being an important element in the motivations of Holocaust tourists. Marianne Hirsch defines it in the following way.

Postmemory characterizes the experience of those who grow up dominated by narratives that preceded their birth, whose own belated stories are evacuated by the stories of the previous generation shaped by traumatic events that can be neither understood nor recreated.

Postmemory is an interrelation between survivors, and post-Holocaust generations of Jews, to save and transmit the Holocaust experience. The first studies regarding the second generation began to appear in the 1970s. For example, Helen Epstein's 1979 book Children of the Holocaust: Conversations with Sons and Daughters of Survivors consists of interviews with survivors' children from all over the world.

Some survivors' children's identities are dependent on their parents' Holocaust experience. The Jewish visits to Holocaust sites are often efforts to explore the origins of their identity. Erica Lehrer considers this Jewish identity quest as "a way to step into the flow of family, community, and history from which one feels displaced". Many Jewish tours are made to establish a connection of survivors and second generation with an unknown place and or identity.

== In Central Europe ==
Holocaust map of Poland

After the end of the Communist rule in Poland, the country had become a popular destination for Jewish heritage travels.

Though many of the tourists have no direct experience of the Holocaust, many Holocaust tours visit authentic Holocaust sites, such as cemeteries and crematoria. Two principal destinations of Holocaust tourism are Poland and Israel. The relationship between those two countries in Holocaust tourism was best illustrated by the anthropologist Jack Kugelmass who employed a 'performance approach' to the Shoa group missions.

The trip is orchestrated so as to minimize contact with modern Poland and instil a negative sense of place. The death camps serve as condensation symbols for the entire Jewish past. By identifying with the Shoa dead, the participants seek to reaffirm their own vulnerability ... as opposed to their privileged position as Jews in American society, while pledging to resist assimilation. The trips inevitably end in Israel, mythicized as 'the Jewish future.'

— J. Feldman, Above the Death Pits, Beneath the Flag

In Israel, the March of the Living (MOTL) was established in 1988, which organizes Holocaust tours for teenagers. Annually, MOTL sends thousands of young people from more than fifty countries to Poland and Israel. Poland is one of the countries most visited by Holocaust tourists due to the number of death camps in Poland. Prior to World War II, Poland had the largest Jewish community in Europe, of which over three million (90%) were murdered.

Death and labor camps were built in Central Europe by the German occupational authorities in the late 1930s and early 1940s, many of them in Poland, of which Auschwitz was the first and largest. In the period between 1941 and 1944 other death camps were established by the Reich in occupied Poland including Majdanek (in Lublin); Birkenau (in Brzezinka); Treblinka (near the village of Treblinka); Bełżec (south-east of Lublin); Sobibór (near the village of Sobibor); Chełmno (near the village of Chełmno nad Nerem).

== Critical view ==
Holocaust tourism, despite its short existence, has come under criticism. Polish journalist and Jewish activist Konstanty Gebert noted:

People tend to forget that the important thing about Polish Jews is not that they waited 900 years for the Germans to come and kill them, but that they actually did something for those 900 years.

— Konstanty Gebert, Living in the Land of Ashes

Anthropologist Jack Kugelmass wrote that the American trips to Poland, sponsored by the Israeli Ministry of Education, promote death rather than life, because the Holocaust sites allow for a strong emotional appeal to a mythologised identity. By the same token, the propagandist messages imposed by the organizers upon students participating in the Shoah voyages are nationalistic rather than universalistic, and inevitably, impact on their empathy toward the Palestinians as well. The criticism of the Shoah group missions by the Israeli News and Opinion had focused on its economic aspect, with individual members calling for a generalized boycott of Poland's Holocaust-related sites. In order to stop the infusion of tourism monies, prominent Rabbis advocated that Jews refrain from going to Poland even if they wished to participate only in the official March of the Living.

These types of [forum] posts indicate that many Jews are willing to sacrifice the benefits of touring historic sites in order to restore lost equity and potentially retaliate against entire nations and their citizens, sixty years after a particular event ... Further, these attempts were often found to be undertaken by people who were not directly involved in the inequitable event, but who experienced the effects of victimization indirectly.

— J. S. Podoshen, J. M. Hunt

== Quest tourism alternative ==
Quest tourism, or the 'roots tourism', is a type of cultural and ethnographic tourism focused on Jewish heritage and their extermination as a historical tragedy. This term was first used by E. Lehrer. It is different from Holocaust tourism because of its orientation to the tragic aspect of Jewish Heritage. Quest tourists have specific motivations and may be characterized by the following features:

1. they are, as a rule, descendants of Holocaust survivors;
2. they travel individually or with close friends and family;
3. they are highly interested in travel;
4. they possess strong postmemory;
5. their goal is to reveal the story and overcome the communal ideology.

== Virtual Jewish communities ==
There are three communities on the internet in which Jewish-related concerns and news are disseminated, particularly regarding Holocaust tourism in Germany and across Central Europe. As described by J. S. Podoshen and J. M. Hunt they are:

1. Jewish Current Events. A primarily North American and Israeli forum with thousands of postings concerning world events, as well as Jewish-related news from global Jewish periodicals.
2. Religious Judaism. A community of over four thousands American orthodox and conservative Jews, whose main interest is Judaism and its spread throughout the world. The community is subdivided into groups based on geographic areas. The group has published over one million posts, and according to the community's archive, the Holocaust in relation to tourism is one of the most discussed topics.
3. Israeli News and Opinion. A site made up of Jews living in and near Israel, which discusses news from popular Israeli and Jewish press sources.
