= Auguste Léon Dorchain =

French poet and dramatist (1857–1930)

Auguste Dorchain
- Born: Auguste Léon Dorchain; 19 March 1857; Cambrai, France
- Died: 8 February 1930 (aged 72); Paris, France
- Resting place: Père Lachaise Cemetery
- Occupations: Poet, dramatist, critic
- Writing career
- Language: French
- Notable works: La Jeunesse pensive (1881); L'Art des vers (1905)
- Notable awards: Legion of Honour
- Literary movement: Parnassianism

Signature
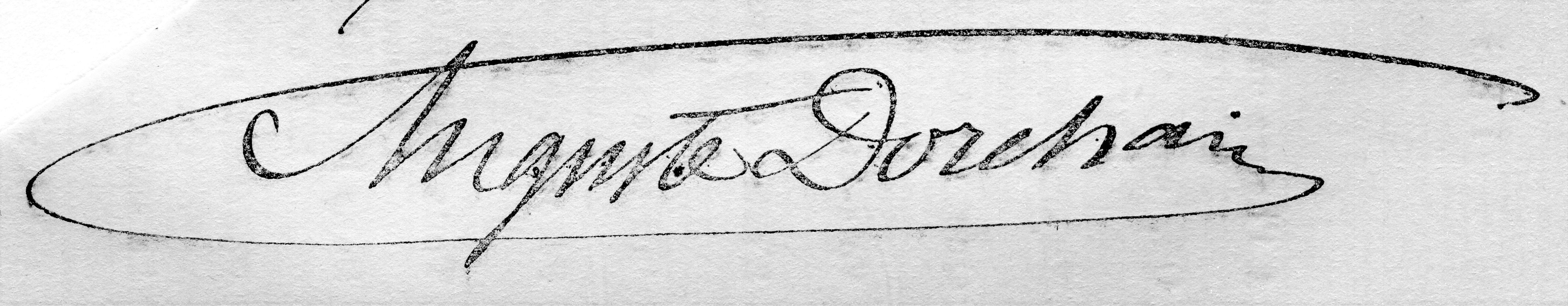

Auguste Léon Dorchain (19 March 1857 – 8 February 1930) was a French poet, playwright and critic. His verse and verse drama drew on the example of the older poets Sully Prudhomme and François Coppée, and in 1902 he became the first president of the Société des poètes français.

== Early life ==
Dorchain was born at Cambrai on 19 March 1857, the grandson of a miller and the son of a merchant. His father died when he was three, and after his mother remarried he was schooled first at Elbeuf and then at the lycée in Rouen, the school Pierre Corneille had once attended. The connection left a mark on him: he kept a lasting admiration for Corneille and eventually devoted a prose study to the dramatist. He went on to read law in Paris but soon gave it up for literature.

== Career ==
Dorchain's first collection, La Jeunesse pensive, appeared in 1881 with a preface by Sully Prudhomme and a dedication that François Coppée had agreed to accept. It was crowned by the Académie française and quickly went into a second edition, an unusual success for a writer of twenty-four.

He turned next to the stage. The four-act verse comedy Conte d'Avril was produced at the Théâtre de l'Odéon in 1885. During the production he met the actress Marie Barthélemy, whom he married in 1887. In 1894 the collection Vers la lumière brought him both a distinction from the Académie française, the Prix Archon-Despérouses, and the Legion of Honour. Two years later he wrote the lyric drama Maître Ambres (1896) with François Coppée. Among his later prose works was a treatise on French versification, L'Art des vers (1905), which argues that the rules of French verse follow from the sounds of the language rather than from arbitrary convention.

Over his career his work was crowned five times by the Académie française, though he twice stood for election to the body without success.

== Société des poètes français ==
The Société des poètes français was founded in 1902 by José-Maria de Heredia, Sully Prudhomme and Léon Dierx to mark the centenary of Victor Hugo's birth. Dorchain was chosen as its first president. It remains the oldest poetry society in France.

== Later years and death ==
Dorchain was deeply affected by the death of his wife in 1922. In 1925 he completed a full edition of the works of Alfred de Vigny, and his last work for the stage, La Revenante aux fleurs, was given at the Odéon in 1929. He kept ties with his birthplace, joining the Amicale de Cambrai in 1914 and becoming an honorary member of the Société d'Émulation de Cambrai in 1926.

He died in Paris on 8 February 1930 (some accounts give 7 February) of injuries from a road accident. After a funeral at the church of Saint-Sulpice he was buried in Père Lachaise Cemetery.

== Selected works ==
- La Jeunesse pensive, preface by Sully Prudhomme (1881)
- Conte d'Avril, verse comedy (1885)
- Vers la lumière (1894)
- Rose d'automne, comedy (1895)
- Maître Ambres, lyric drama with François Coppée (1896)
- Pour l'amour, verse drama (1901)
- L'Art des vers (1905)
- Pierre Corneille, study (1918)
