= War tourism =

Tourism for old war zones

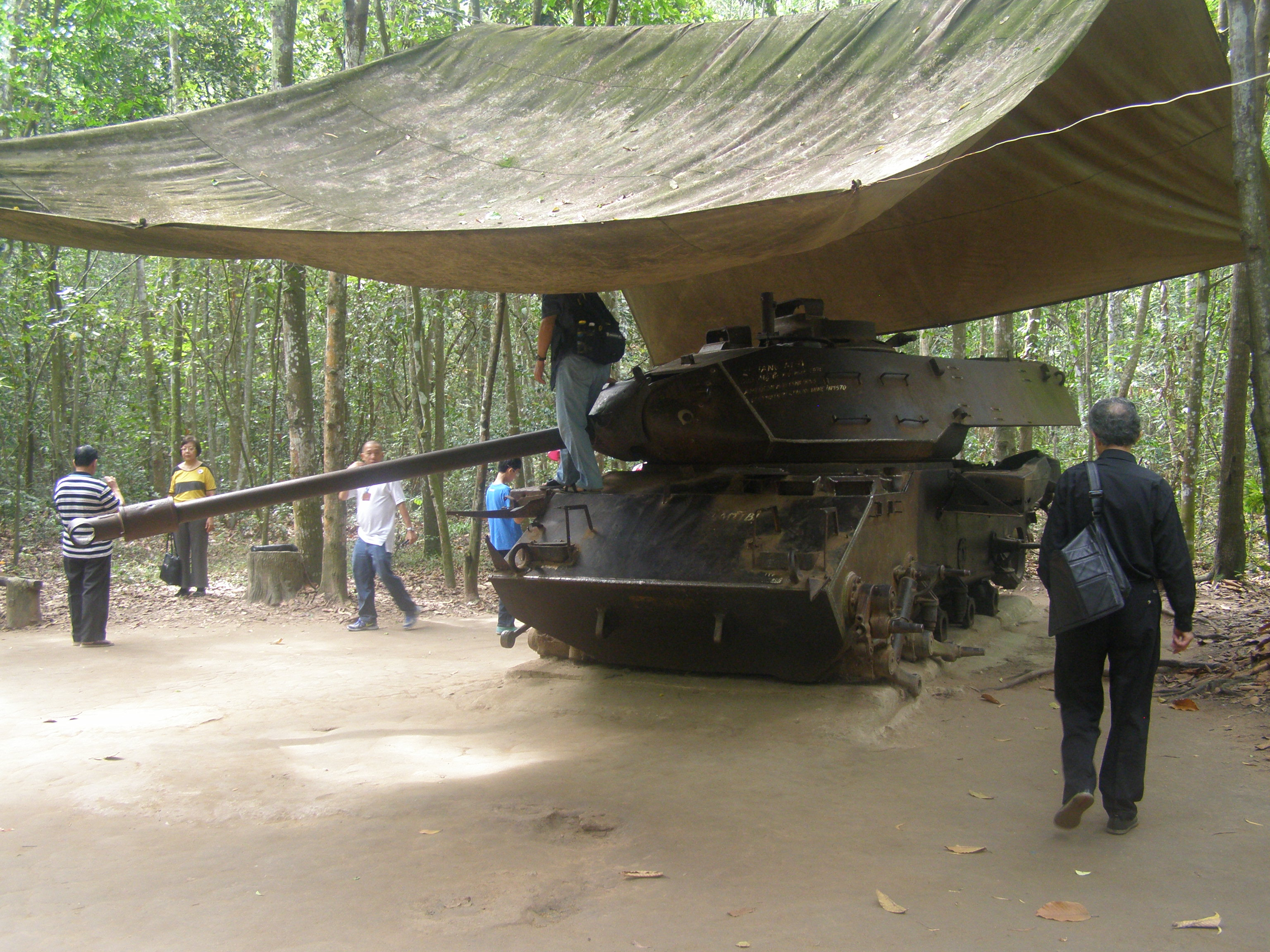
Tourists inspecting a damaged M41 Walker Bulldog from the Vietnam War near the Củ Chi tunnels.

War tourism is recreational travel to active or former war zones for purposes of sightseeing or historical study. The term may be used pejoratively to describe thrill-seeking in dangerous and forbidden places. In 1988, P. J. O'Rourke applied the pejorative meaning to war correspondents.

== Early warfare ==
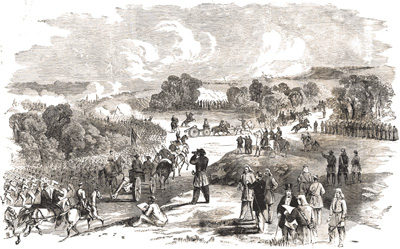
Tourists spectating at the First Battle of the Bull Run, The Soldier in our Civil War by Frank Leslie (1893)

War artists and correspondents such as Willem van de Velde are considered to be the first war tourists. Van de Velde took to sea in 1653 in a small boat to observe a naval battle between the Dutch and the English, making many sketches on the spot.

=== Crimean War ===
During the Crimean War, tourists led by Mark Twain visited the wrecked city of Sevastopol – he even scolded his travel mates for walking off with souvenir shrapnel. Prince Menshikov invited the ladies of Sevastopol to watch the battle of Alma from a nearby hill. Fanny Duberly traveled with her husband to the Crimea in 1854 and stayed with him throughout his time there, despite the protests of commanders such as Lord Lucan. As the only woman at the front-lines, she was the center of much attention. She was told of planned attacks ahead of time, giving her the opportunity to be in a good position to witness them.

=== American Civil War ===
The First Battle of Bull Run, also known as the First Battle of Manassas, was fought on July 21, 1861, in Prince William County, Virginia, near the city of Manassas. It was the first major land battle of the American Civil War. Expecting an easy Union victory, the wealthy elite of nearby Washington, including congressmen and their families, had come to picnic and watch the battle. When the Union army was driven back, the roads back to Washington were blocked by panicked civilians attempting to flee in their carriages. Frank Leslie made an engraving of this called The Soldier in Our Civil War. The Battle of Gettysburg was also spectated by a number of tourists, including Arthur Lyon Fremantle.

=== Late 19th century ===
Thomas Cook began promoting tours to the battlefields of the Second Boer War before the conflict had ended. A variety of other travel agents advertised the easily accessible and picturesque battlefields of Tugela and Ladysmith. Groups of tourists also closely followed the Franco-Prussian War visiting the battlefields shortly after the fighting was over. The above were criticized by Alfred Milner, The Observer and Punch.

One of the first travel agents, Henry Gaze, created a tour which included the battlefield of Waterloo in 1854. Waterloo was also a destination of an 1886 Polytechnic Touring Association tour, during which schoolboys and teachers visited the site for educational purposes. According to the 1913 Thomas Cook travel guide, the rising popularity of Waterloo as a tourist attraction led to the appearance of numerous charlatans claiming to have participated in the battle. The guide also highlighted the booming trade of relics and souvenirs related to the engagement.

=== World War I ===
Despite the criticism war tourism continued to develop following the pace of the tourism industry in general. At the beginning of World War I it became evident that following the end of the war, the related battlefields would attract considerable attention from potential tourists. Although instances of war tourism during the Great War have been documented, they remained limited due to opposition by the French authorities.

Following the end of the war, previous instances of trophy hunting were replaced by pilgrimage style visits. British intelligence officer Hugh Pollard described the Ypres Salient as a holy ground due to the large number of Entente graves in the region. Numerous veterans echoed those thoughts. Anglican and Catholic religious tourism became increasingly linked with war tourism during the interwar period. In September 1934, 100,000 Catholic former servicemen from both sides of the conflict visited Lourdes in order to pray for peace. A large number of Anglican tourists also undertook tours to the battlefields of the Palestinian campaign. Greece, Turkey and Italy also became popular war tourism destinations.

A large number of battlefield guides were produced by a variety of travel agencies further fueling the rise of war tours. A 1936 study brought to light the fact that the majority of war tourists during the period were driven by curiosity or were paying homage to their deceased relatives. Today, WWI battlefield tourism attracts tens of thousands of tourists to former war zones on the Western Front and in the Dardanelles for example.

=== World War II ===
Following the end of World War II former battlefields created new war tourist destinations. Saipan, as well as other battlefields of the Pacific, became a place of pilgrimage for Japanese veterans who reburied and erected monuments to their fallen comrades.

== Modern warfare ==
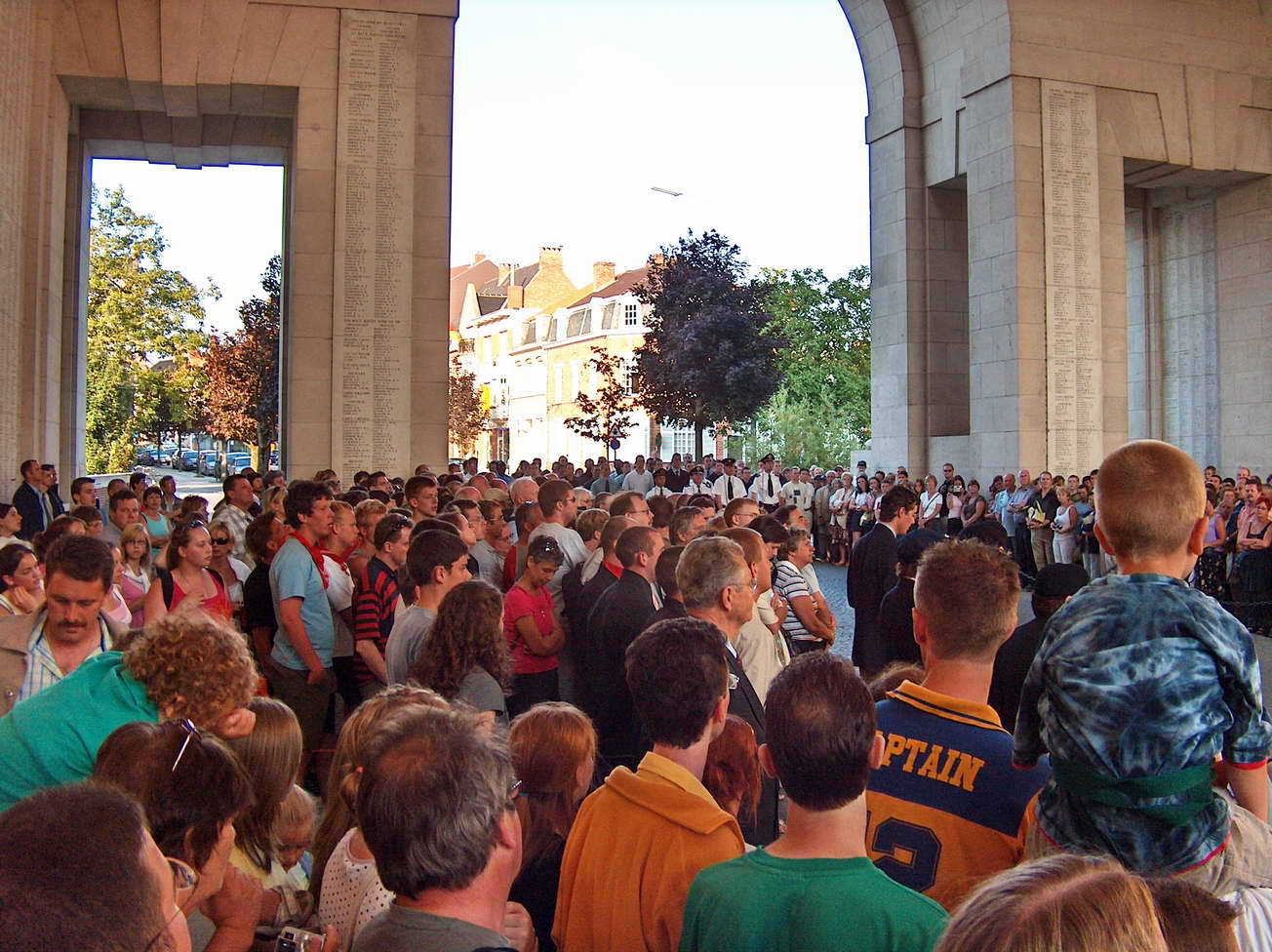
A group of war tourists at the Menin Gate Memorial to the Missing, Belgium

Foley and Lennon explored the idea that people are attracted to regions and sites where "inhuman acts" have occurred. They claim that motivation is driven by media coverage and a desire to see for themselves, and that there is a symbiotic relationship between the attraction and the visitor, whether it be a death camp or site of a celebrity's death.

=== 20th century ===
During the Siege of Sarajevo (1992–1996), an alleged war tourism phenomenon took place involving human hunting dubbed the Sarajevo Safari. According to reports, wealthy foreign nationals were enabled, for large monetary fees, to shoot at civilians in the besieged city with sniper rifles for entertainment purposes.

=== 21st century ===
Former security professional Rick Sweeney formed War Zone Tours in 2008, while another of the companies operating in this market was begun by a former The New York Times journalist Nicholas Wood. Sweeney is part of a group of tour guides who take tourists to countries that have experienced or are mired in conflict. A tourist on a trip to Baghdad in 2010 might have paid up to $40,000. In 2014, war tourism was reportedly on the increase and included tourists in Israel to spectate on the Syrian Civil War. The desire for the experience and the documentation and photographing of it through social networking could be helping to increase war tourism, according to a Tel Aviv-based journalist. War tourism in Israel is also covered in the 2011 documentary film War Matador by Avner Faingulernt and Macabit Abramson. The Syrian civil war attracted adventure-seekers. According to retired Israel Defense Forces colonel Kobi Marom, who leads tours of the war zone across the Israeli border, tourists are interested in seeing the conflict and go "crazy" when they learn that they are probably being observed by Al-Qaeda militants.

In Iran, students, members of Basij militia and interested people are routinely taken to the former battle sites of the Iran–Iraq War as the war is considered by the Iranian ruling regime a "holy defense" and an ideological pillar to the existence of the ruling Islamic Republic. The trips are organized by Basij, an offshoot of the Iranian Revolutionary Guard Corps (IRGC) which enlists the travelers normally in mosques, schools or universities. The trips, which are officially called "Tours for the Travelers of Light" (Persian: اردوهای راهیان نور), are low-cost and are taken by bus under poor safety conditions. Since 2008, accidents involving the buses taking the "tourists" have killed at least 70 people. In 2013, the then Education Minister Hajibabayi proposed that those killed in these tours be granted the degree of martyr.

In 2022, Canadian politician Dominic Cardy vacationed in Ukraine. He visited sites that had experienced Russian bombing and damage and shared multiple images and videos to his personal X (Twitter) account.

In 2021, British internet personality 'Lord' Miles Routledge visited Afghanistan during the Fall of Kabul, and has since returned multiple times. He was captured and detained by the Taliban for several months. He shared photos, livestreams, videos and stories from Afghanistan online as well as later recounting his experience in interviews and a book.

== See also ==
- Dark tourism
- Disaster tourism
- The World's Most Dangerous Places
- Tourism in Syria#After 2011
