= Sarajevo Safari =

War tourism during the siege of Sarajevo

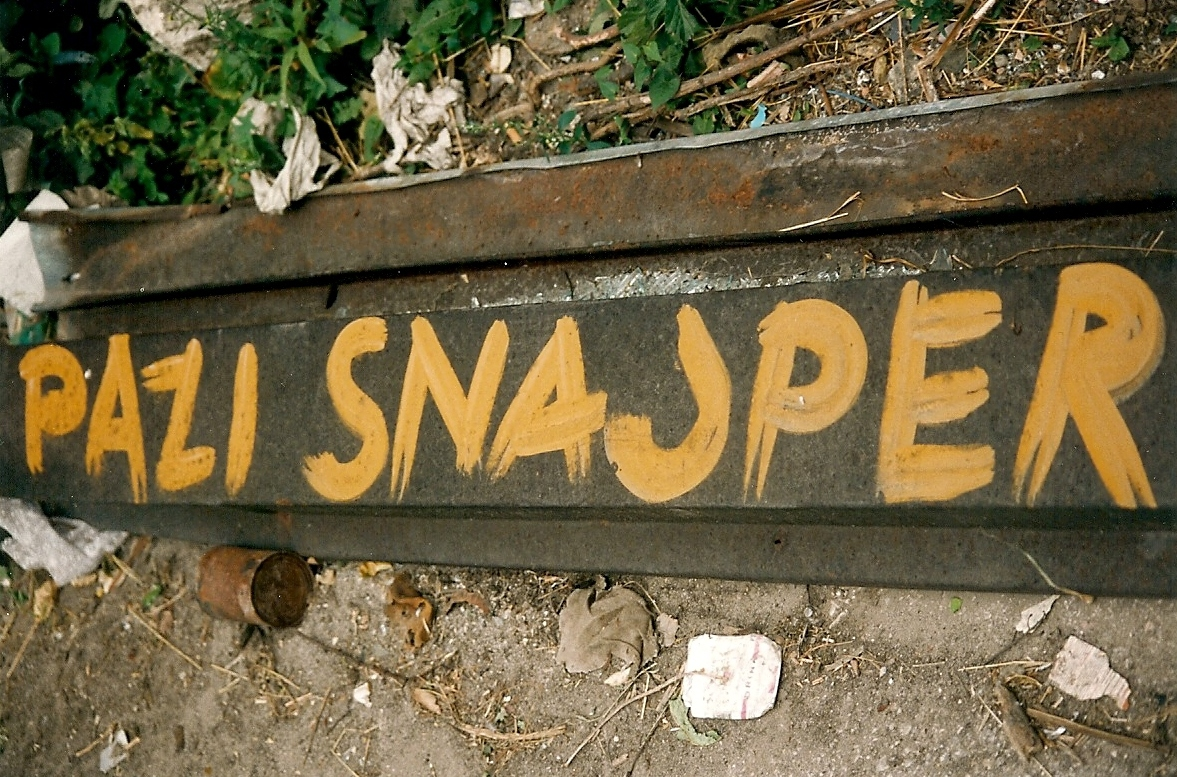
- A sniper warning sign in Sarajevo
- Date: During the siege of Sarajevo (1992–1996)
- Location: Sarajevo, Bosnia and Herzegovina (Allegedly Grbavica, and other VRS positions)
- Also known as: "Tourist snipers", "Weekend snipers", "Sniper Safari" "Murder tourism"
- Type: Alleged war tourism / human hunting
- Cause: Commercial transaction, recreational activity
- Target: Civilians in besieged Sarajevo
- Perpetrator: Unidentified foreign nationals (allegedly with VRS logistics)
- First reporter: Rumors (1990s): Corriere della Sera; Official (2022): Miran Zupanič (film)
- Patron: Allegedly: State Security Service of Serbia
- Organised by: Allegedly: SDB Serbia (incl. Jovica Stanišić), Yugoslav People's Army (logistics), Army of Republika Srpska (positions)
- Participants: Unidentified foreign nationals (allegedly from Italy, Canada, Belgium, the United States, and Russia)
- Outcome: Open investigations by the Prosecutor's Office of BiH (2022) and the Public Prosecutor's Office in Milan (2025)
- Casualties: Civilians in Sarajevo, including children
- Deaths: Unknown (as part of the total siege casualties)
- Injuries: Unknown
- Inquiries: Active investigation by the Prosecutor's Office of BiH (since 2022); Active investigation by the Public Prosecutor's Office in Milan (since 2025)
- Suspects: Unidentified persons (BiH complaint); Italian citizens (Milan investigation), incl. a "Milanese businessman"
- Charges: Criminal complaints: Benjamina Karić (to BiH & Italian prosecutors); Ezio Gavazzeni and Guido Salvini (to Milan prosecutors); Counter-complaint: Ljubiša Ćosić (against the film's director)
- Publication bans: Requests filed for a "ban on screening" the film in Republika Srpska
- Footage: Sarajevo Safari (2022) documentary film

Sarajevo Safari is the name for an alleged war tourism phenomenon during the siege of Sarajevo (1992–1996) involving human hunting. According to the reports, wealthy foreign nationals were enabled, for large monetary fees, to shoot at civilians in the besieged city with sniper rifles for entertainment purposes.

Claims about this phenomenon came to international public attention in 2022 with the premiere of the Slovenian documentary film Sarajevo Safari, directed by Miran Zupanič and co-produced by Al Jazeera Balkans. The alleged activity took place from established positions of the Army of Republika Srpska (VRS) in the hills surrounding Sarajevo.

In response to the film's allegations, official legal actions were launched. The Prosecutor's Office of Bosnia and Herzegovina opened a case in November 2022. In November 2025, the Public Prosecutor's Office in Milan (Italy) also opened an investigation into the alleged participation of Italian citizens in these acts, but involves other nationalities as well, like French, Belgians, Swiss, and Austrians. Officials from Republika Srpska and war veterans' associations sharply denied all allegations, calling them "propaganda" and "heinous lies" directed against the VRS and the Serb people.

== Early accounts ==
=== Reporting in the 1990s ===
Rumors about the phenomenon had existed earlier. As early as 1992, the Italian newspaper Corriere della Sera reported on the possibility of Italian extremists traveling to Bosnia to spend weekends as snipers. The phenomenon was also mentioned in the book The Bastards of Sarajevo (Italian: I bastardi di Sarajevo) by the Italian author Luca Leone.

The 1992 documentary "Serbian Epics" by Paweł Pawlikowski featured Russian National Bolshevist Eduard Limonov hosted by Radovan Karadžić on the hills above Sarajevo and firing a machine gun with a telescopic sight at the besieged town.

=== 2007 ICTY testimony ===
The film's allegations subsequently gained weight with the discovery of earlier, independent testimony before the International Criminal Tribunal for the former Yugoslavia (ICTY).

John Jordan, a former US Marine and firefighter, testified in The Hague in 2007 during the trial of General Dragomir Milošević, commander of the VRS's Sarajevo-Romanija Corps. Jordan stated under oath that on "several occasions" he had seen individuals he described as "tourist snipers." He noted that they "did not appear to be locals" based on their "clothing, weaponry, and the way they were being escorted by local officers."

When asked directly where he had seen these individuals, Jordan replied: "while I was visiting the Serb firefighters in Grbavica." This location matches the testimony from Zupanič's film.

== 2022 Sarajevo Safari documentary ==
The phenomenon became globally known after the premiere of the documentary film Sarajevo Safari by the Slovenian director Miran Zupanič, screened at the AJB DOC Film Festival in Sarajevo in September 2022. The film was co-produced by the Slovenian company Arsmedia and Al Jazeera Balkans. Zupanič had previously filmed in Bosnia during the war, and described Sarajevo Safari as the darkest part of his unofficial "Bosnia trilogy".

=== Main allegations of the film ===
The film bases its claims on the testimonies of several sources, including an anonymous former member of an intelligence service. According to these testimonies: organized arrivals came via Belgrade, which had a functional airport. Participants were allegedly transported by a Yugoslav People's Army helicopter or by road to Pale, and then to VRS positions. The primary location cited for the shootings is the Sarajevo neighborhood of Grbavica, which was under VRS control and had a direct view of the city. Witnesses mention that the "tourists" came from various countries, including the United States, Canada, Russia, and Italy. The most controversial allegation from the film is the existence of a "price list," with a witness stating that "tariffs were higher if a child was hit."

== Legal consequences and investigations ==
=== Investigation in Bosnia and Herzegovina ===
Following the film's premiere, the then-mayor of Sarajevo, Benjamina Karić, filed a criminal complaint in late September 2022 with the Prosecutor's Office of Bosnia and Herzegovina against unidentified persons and responsible members of the VRS. On November 1, 2022, the Prosecutor's Office of Bosnia and Herzegovina confirmed that a case had been opened and assigned to a prosecutor in the Special Department for War Crimes.

Karić later supplemented the complaint, attaching John Jordan's ICTY testimony and proposing the hearing of author Luca Leone. She also requested access to the military archives of the Armed Forces of Bosnia and Herzegovina, a move supported by director Miran Zupanič.

By November 2025, three years after the case was opened, there was no public information on its progress, prompting Benjamina Karić to send a new inquiry to the Prosecutor's Office regarding the case's status. Italian media and journalist Ezio Gavazzeni reported that the investigation in Bosnia and Herzegovina had been "archived" or that there was a "lack of any proceedings."

=== Investigation in Italy ===
Due to the perceived stagnation in Bosnia and Herzegovina, an investigation was launched in Italy. Journalist Ezio Gavazzeni and former judge Guido Salvini filed a detailed criminal complaint with the Public Prosecutor's Office in Milan on January 28, 2025. Gavazzeni's investigation included an interview with a former Bosnian intelligence officer, who claimed he reported the existence of the safaris to SISMI, who allegedly responded that they have "put a stop to it" and the trips eventually ceased.

In the spring of 2025, Milanese prosecutor Alessandro Gobbis officially opened an investigation. The legal classification of the crime is "intentional homicide with the aggravating circumstances of cruelty and base motives." The crime has no statute of limitations in Italy and carries a maximum life sentence.

According to Italian media reports and Gavazzeni's complaint, the investigation is focused on Italian citizens, including those linked to the far right. A "Milanese businessman who owns a private cosmetic surgery clinic" is mentioned, as well as others from Turin and Trieste. The alleged route involved a flight from Trieste to Belgrade (on the Serbian charter company "Aviogenex"), followed by a helicopter transport to VRS positions. There are allegations that the operation was organized by the State Security Service of Serbia, with Jovica Stanišić being named. The amounts were specified as a "package" equivalent to €80,000 to €100,000 in today's value. Multiple sources in the Italian investigation confirmed the allegation that "the highest price was paid for killing a child," or that "shooting children cost more."

In February 2026, Italian media reported that an alleged perpetrator was under investigation by Italian authorities. The suspect, a former truck driver, had allegedly bragged about his actions. In June, Carabinieri police searched the home of a 65-year-old man and found "significant" evidence that the man took part in the shootings; according to his ex-wife, he used to complain about nightmares as a result of his actions.

=== Investigation in Belgium ===
In November 2025, Belgian Member of Parliament Leila Agic reported that Belgian nationals may have participated in the so-called "sniper safaris" during the Siege of Sarajevo in the 1990s. The individuals allegedly paid Bosnian Serb forces for access to sniper positions from which civilians were targeted. Agic urged the Federal Public Prosecutor's Office to investigate potential war crimes, though no names or prosecutions have been confirmed. Italian politician Matteo Salvini declined to provide further details but twice emphasised Belgian involvement in the case.

== See also ==
- Bosnian genocide
- Human safari (Kherson, Ukraine)
