= Sarajevo Safari (film) =

- Official poster for Sarajevo Safari
- Directed by: Miran Zupanič
- Written by: Miran Zupanič
- Produced by: Franci Zajc; Boštjan Ikovic
- Starring: Stana Čišić; Samir Čišić; Faruk Šabanović; Edin Subašić
- Cinematography: Božo Zadravec; Maks Sušnik; Miran Zupanič
- Edited by: Jaka Kovačič; Miran Zupanič
- Music by: Tilen Slakan
- Production companies: Arsmedia; Al Jazeera Balkans; Iridium Film; Zvokana; MB Grip
- Distributed by: Arsmedia
- Release date: September 9, 2022; (AJB DOC)
- Running time: 75 minutes
- Country: Slovenia
- Languages: Slovenian; Bosnian
- Budget: €40,000 (grant)

Sarajevo Safari is a 2022 Slovenian documentary film directed by Miran Zupanič. The film alleges that during the siege of Sarajevo (1992–1996), a form of war tourism emerged involving the organization of human-hunting safaris through which wealthy foreigners paid high fees to shoot at civilians from sniper positions held by the Army of Republika Srpska (VRS).

The film premiered at the Al Jazeera Balkans (AJB) DOC Film Festival in September 2022, drawing significant international attention and intense controversy. It directly led to the opening of official investigations into the allegations by the Prosecutor's Office of Bosnia and Herzegovina in November 2022 and by the Prosecutor's Office in Milan, Italy, in 2025.

== Allegations presented in the film ==
The documentary presents its narrative through witness testimony, including an anonymous former intelligence agent. According to the film, the "safari" was a sophisticated, secret operation.

The film bases its claims on the testimonies of several sources, including an anonymous former member of an intelligence service. According to these testimonies: organized arrivals came via Belgrade, which had a functional airport. Participants were allegedly transported by a Yugoslav People's Army helicopter or by road to Pale, and then to VRS positions. The primary location cited for the shootings is the Sarajevo neighborhood of Grbavica, which was under VRS control and had a direct view of the city. Witnesses mention that the "tourists" came from various countries, including the United States, Canada, Russia, and Italy. The most controversial allegation from the film is the existence of a "price list," with a witness stating that "tariffs were higher if a child was hit."

== Production ==
The film is the third in director Miran Zupanič's unofficial "Bosnia trilogy," following Oči Bosne (1993) and Moj prijatelj Mujo (2012). Zupanič was first told the story in February 2019 by producer Franci Zajc, who had spent years searching for individuals willing to speak on camera about the phenomenon.

Zupanič described the story as "absolutely shocking," stating that he initially "could not believe that so much evil exists". He has stated that the film's intention was not to scandalize the public but to explore the "phenomenology of evil" and that it is "a film about the evil that people inflict on people," not one directed against any specific nation.

All archival footage used in the film, with one exception, was shot by the production team (led by Zajc) during the war in 1993 and 1994. Zupanič noted that some witnesses who initially agreed to participate later backed out, suggesting that fear was still present nearly 30 years later. The film was co-produced by the Slovenian production house Arsmedia and Al Jazeera Balkans.

== Release and reception ==
Sarajevo Safari premiered at the fifth AJB DOC Film Festival in Sarajevo between September 9–13, 2022. It also screened at the 25th Festival of Slovenian Film and the 12th International Crime and Punishment Film Festival in Istanbul. It received the Jury Award (DOKUDOC Selection) at the 11th DOKUDOC festival in Maribor.

The film had a strong reception in Slovenia, where it was seen by over 4,000 viewers in cinemas, an unusually high number for a documentary. Zupanič described the audience reaction at screenings as a "hush" (tajac) and "silence" (muk), with the public being deeply "shaken" (potresena) by the testimonies.

In Sarajevo, Zupanič noted a different, additional reaction from siege survivors. He stated that besides being shaken, the local audience felt a profound sense of "humiliation" (poniženosti) at the realization that their suffering and struggle for survival had allegedly been a "sport" for "wanton, wealthy foreigners".

Media reactions in Slovenia were largely positive, though some journalists expressed "skepticism" (skepsa) and suggested the film should have presented more concrete evidence. Zupanič responded to this by stating, "all the evidence that was available to us is in the film," and argued that when "three sources from different countries, who do not know each other, publicly testify about fragments of the same phenomenon, then it is no longer fiction".

=== Controversy and denials ===
The film's release prompted what Zupanič called a "media-political tsunami" from Republika Srpska (RS), one of the two political entities of Bosnia and Herzegovina.

Officials from Republika Srpska, including Milorad Dodik and Željka Cvijanović, along with Serb veteran groups, vehemently denied the film's claims. RS-based media, such as RTRS, labeled the documentary "propaganda" and "heinous lies about the VRS". There were official demands from Republika Srpska to ban the film's screening.

In a direct response, the mayor of Istočno Sarajevo, Ljubiša Ćosić, filed a criminal complaint against director Miran Zupanič personally.

== Impact and legal investigations ==
The film's primary impact was its role as a direct catalyst for official legal investigations in two countries, nearly 30 years after the alleged crimes.

=== Bosnia and Herzegovina ===
At the end of September 2022, immediately following the film's premiere, the mayor of Sarajevo, Benjamina Karić, filed an official criminal complaint with the Prosecutor's Office of Bosnia and Herzegovina against the unknown (NN) perpetrators alleged in the film.

On November 1, 2022, the BiH Prosecutor's Office officially confirmed that it had opened a case based on the complaint. It announced that a prosecutor from the Special Department for War Crimes had been assigned to "undertake the necessary measures to verify the allegations". Karić later supplemented the complaint with additional evidence, including the 2007 testimony of US Marine John Jordan (who had spoken of "tourist shooters" on Grbavica) and a proposal to hear author Luca Leone.

However, by November 2025, the investigation was widely perceived as having stalled. Italian media reported it had been "shelved" or that there was a "lack of any proceedings". This prompted Benjamina Karić to announce she would send a new official inquiry to the Prosecutor's Office demanding to know the status of the case.

=== Italy ===
The perceived lack of action in Bosnia and Herzegovina led to a second investigation in Italy, for which the film was the explicit "starting point".

Italian journalist Ezio Gavazzeni stated he was "shaken" by the film and began his own investigation. On January 28, 2025, Gavazzeni and former magistrate Guido Salvini filed a detailed 17-page criminal complaint with the Prosecutor's Office in Milan.

In the spring of 2025, Milan prosecutor Alessandro Gobbis opened a formal investigation into Italian citizens for "intentional homicide aggravated by cruelty and vile motives". The Italian investigation cited allegations that participants flew from Verona to Belgrade on the Aviogenex airline, that the operation was organized by Serbian state security services, and that the "package" cost between €80,000 and €100,000, with the highest price reserved for killing a child.

== External corroboration ==
In the public discussion following the film's release, journalists and officials pointed to pre-existing evidence that seemed to support the film's claims. The most significant was the 2007 testimony of former US Marine John Jordan before the International Criminal Tribunal for the former Yugoslavia (ICTY). In the trial of Dragomir Milošević, Jordan stated that he had seen individuals on VRS positions in Grbavica who "did not act like locals" and fit the profile of "tourist shooters". The film's director, Miran Zupanič, stated that he and his team were unaware of Jordan's testimony during production.

== Reactions and denials ==
Reactions to the film from Republika Srpska were strong and coordinated. High-ranking political officials, including Milorad Dodik and Željka Cvijanović, and the mayor of East Sarajevo, Ljubiša Ćosić, condemned the film. VRS war veterans' associations "fiercely denied" the claims. In media and official statements in Republika Srpska, the film was consistently labeled as "propaganda," "heinous lies about the VRS," and an attempt to "demonize the Serb people." A legal counter-action was also taken. The mayor of East Sarajevo, Ljubiša Ćosić, filed a criminal complaint against the film's director, Miran Zupanič. Requests were also made for a "ban on screening" the film in Republika Srpska.
