= Antelope Hill Publishing =

American white nationalist publisher

- Official logo of Antelope Hill Publishing
- Status: Active
- Founded: February 18, 2020; 6 years ago
- Founder: Vincent Cucchiara; Sarah Cucchiara; Dmitri Loutsik
- Country of origin: United States
- Nonfiction topics: White nationalism
- Official website: antelopehillpublishing.com

Antelope Hill is an American white nationalist publisher based in Pennsylvania. It is known for selling translations of historical works by Nazis, fascists and ultranationalists, as well as new works by far-right writers. It was founded in 2020. The Southern Poverty Law Center (SPLC) has called Antelope Hill an antisemitic hate group.

Translations that Antelope Hill has sold have included works by Adolf Hitler, the Belgian Nazi collaborator Leon Degrelle, Nazi propagandist Wilfrid Bade, Italian neo-fascist philosopher Julius Evola, and others. Most of the translations are credited to pseudonyms, according to the SPLC.

== History ==
The company was founded on February 18, 2020, by recent Penn State graduates Vincent Cucchiara and Sarah Cucchiara (née Nahrgang), who are married, and Dmitri Loutsik. The three founders kept their identities secret while incorporating the company, but their names were revealed by an investigation by the Southern Poverty Law Center (SPLC) in 2022. The company was based in Montgomery County, Pennsylvania, as of 2022. In Pennsylvania the company is registered under a foreign owner.

The Cucchiaras and Loutsik have been active in the white power movement and have cooperated with far-right members of The Right Stuff network, according to the SPLC. At Penn State, Vincent Cucchiara and Loutsik were active members of the Bull-Moose Party, a campus group described as alt-right which was formed to support Donald Trump in the 2016 United States Presidential Election. Sarah Cucchiara has used the alias "Margaret Bauer" on far-right podcasts, as well as on Twitter via the handle @MargaretBauer88, according to the SPLC ("88" is often used as code for "heil Hitler"). The SPLC states that Sarah Cucchiara was a Norristown-area public school teacher who left the job after a controversy about racist posts on Facebook. The SPLC said Antelope Hill collaborates frequently with "a pro-Hitler white supremacist group", the National Justice Party.

In 2022, Antelope Hill was one of the white nationalist publishers reported to be included in offerings to public libraries by the ebook service Hoopla. Librarians quoted by WGBH expressed frustration that misinformation was being spread by the service, with funding from taxpayers and library contributors. The SPLC said Antelope Hill boasts of its books' success in trending in obscure sales subcategories on Amazon. As of September 2022, Amazon had removed some Antelope Hill titles while keeping others, and Barnes & Noble had removed an Antelope Hill page from its website.

In 2023, Antelope Hill sponsored an advertisement on "The Quartering", a pop culture podcast hosted by Jeremy Hambly.

== Ideology and authors published ==
The SPLC said contemporary authors in Antelope Hill's catalog "repeatedly spread conspiracy theories blaming perceived problems on Jewish people, as well as dehumanizing Black and LGBTQ people". The company's website says it aims to publish books relating to "lost causes, righteous mercenaries, anonymous critics, freedom fighters, revolutionaries, and exiles". Most of its translations are credited to pseudonyms, including one credited to an online neo-Nazi message board, the Bureau of Memetic Warfare, according to the SPLC. Antelope Hill promotional material refers to "Uncle Hitler", and the company offered discounts to commemorate Hitler's birthday.

Translations that Antelope Hill has sold have included works by Adolf Hitler, the Belgian Nazi collaborator Leon Degrelle, Nazi propagandist Wilfrid Bade, Italian neo-fascist philosopher Julius Evola, and others. Most of the translations are credited to pseudonyms, according to the SPLC. They have published the far-right influencer Raw Egg Nationalist, a pseudonym of author Charles Cornish-Dale. Cornish-Dale appeared in a Tucker Carlson documentary in 2022. Cornish-Dale's book, The Eggs Benedict Option, advocates for an alternative meat-heavy diet. The foreword for the book, published by Antelope Hill, was written by Noor Bin Ladin, the niece of Osama Bin Ladin. Antelope Hill has also published British war tourist Miles Routledge.

In 2026, Antelope Hill was invited to a Christian nationalist conference in Ogden, Utah. White supremacist podcaster "Mainstream Dissident" attended on behalf of the group. Flyers distributed by Antelope Hill at the conference praised George Lincoln Rockwell, the founder of the American Nazi Party, and Cosmotheism, the religion founded by neo-Nazi William Luther Pierce.

== Imprints ==
- Jackalope Hill (fiction imprint)
- Little Frog Hill (children's book imprint)
