= Henri-Lucien Cheffer =

French engraver, illustrator, painter, banknote and stamp designer

- Born: 30 December 1880; Paris, France
- Died: 3 May 1957 (aged 76)
- Known for: Painting, engraving, stamp and banknote designs

Henri-Lucien Cheffer (30 December 1880, Paris – 3 May 1957) was a French painter, engraver and illustrator. Cheffer was chiefly known for his postage stamp designs, the first of which he designed in 1911. He also designed bank notes for French Algeria, Tunisia, the Netherlands and the Dutch East Indies.

== Early life ==
Cheffer was born in 1880 in Paris. He studied at the School of Decorative Arts, Paris, and in the studio of Léon Bonnat.

== Awards ==
He received the second prize for engraving in the Grand Prix de Rome in 1904 and 1906. At the annual exhibition Salon des Artistes Français, he received an honourable mention in 1902, a medal in 1919 and a medal of honour in 1927.

== Work ==
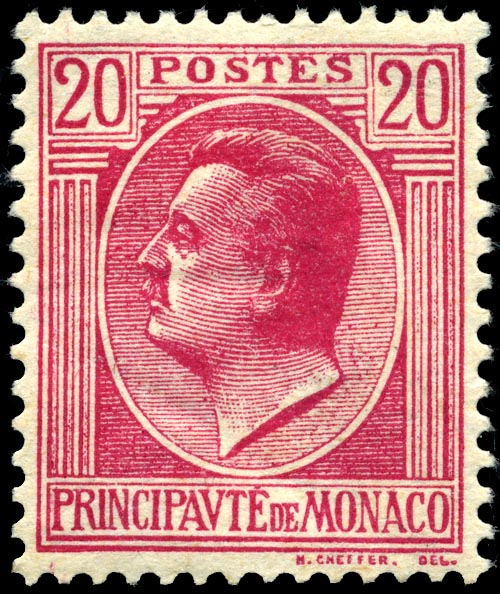
1924 Monaco stamp design by Henry-Lucien Cheffer

=== Paintings ===
Cheffer was a member of the Société des Artistes Français, where he exhibited exclusively. During the First World War, Cheffer produced many watercolors depicting scenes of battle and destruction.

=== Postage stamp designs ===
Cheffer was responsible for 384 stamp designs, 52 of which were for France. His first stamp design, in 1911, was for Iran.

In 1940, Cheffer was invited by the French government to design a joint Anglo-French stamp.

In 1955, he designed a set of stamps depicting Monaco's Prince Rainier III.

Cheffer's series of French postage stamps, known as the Marianne de Cheffer series, was in circulation from 1967 to 1971.

== Collections ==
- US National Library of Medicine
- Library of Congress, Washington
- Wellcome Collection, London
- Imperial War Museums, London
- Louvre museum, Paris
- Museum of Fine Arts Boston
