= Outline of tourism =

Overview and topical guide of tourism

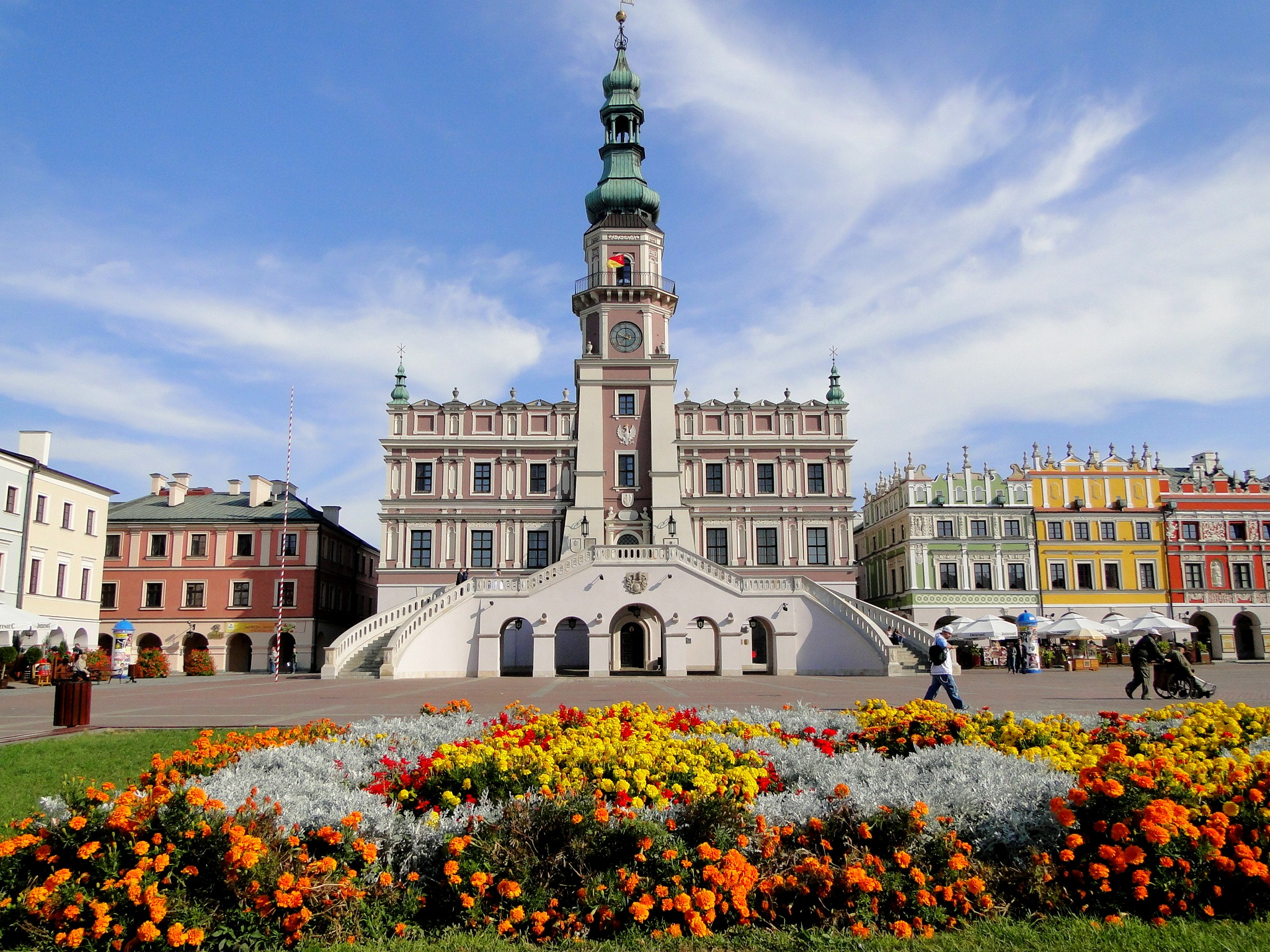
The Old City of Zamość (Poland), built as an ideal city, now a UNESCO World Heritage Site

The following outline is provided as an overview of and topical guide to tourism:

Tourism – travel for pleasure or business; also the theory and practice of touring, the business of attracting, accommodating, and entertaining tourists, and the business of operating tours. Tourism may be international, or within the traveller's country. The World Tourism Organization defines tourism more generally, in terms which go "beyond the common perception of tourism as being limited to holiday activity only", as people "traveling to and staying in places outside their usual environment for not more than one consecutive year for leisure, business and other purposes".

== What type of thing is tourism? ==
Tourism can be described as all of the following:

- A form of recreation
- An economic sector

== Types of tourism ==
- Accessible tourism
- Adventure travel
- Agritourism
- Alternative tourism
- Atomic tourism
- Birth tourism
- Business tourism
- Culinary tourism
  - Enotourism
- Cultural tourism
  - Archaeological tourism
  - Bookstore tourism
  - Music tourism
  - Pop-culture tourism
- Dark tourism
  - Holocaust tourism
- Disaster tourism
- Domestic tourism
- Drug tourism
- Ecotourism
  - Shark tourism
- Extreme tourism
- Factory tour
- Garden tourism
- Genealogy tourism
- Geotourism
- Heritage tourism
  - Militarism heritage tourism
- Honeymoon
- Jihadi tourism
- Jungle tourism
- Justice tourism
- LGBT tourism
- Literary tourism
  - Tolkien tourism
- Medical tourism
  - Dental tourism
- Tourism on the Moon
- Nautical tourism
- Lists of named passenger trains
- Religious tourism
  - Christian tourism
  - Halal tourism
  - Kosher tourism
- Rural tourism
- Sacred travel
- Safaris
- Sex tourism
  - Child sex tourism
  - Female sex tourism
- Slum tourism
- Space tourism
- Sports tourism
- Stag party tourism
- Suicide tourism
- Sustainable tourism
- Vacation
- Volunteer travel
- War tourism
- Water tourism
- Wellness tourism
- Wildlife tourism

== History of tourism ==
History of tourism

- Grand Tour

== Tourism support services ==
=== Hospitality industry ===
Hospitality industry

- Bed and breakfast
- Boutique hotel
- Conference and resort hotels
- Convention center
- Destination spa
- Receptionist
- General manager
- Homestay
- Hospitality management studies
- Hostel
- Hotel
- Hotel manager
- Inn
- Resort island
- Motel
- Referral chain
- Resort
- Resort town
- Restaurant
- Seaside resort
- Ski resort

== General tourism concepts ==
- Campus tour
- Convention (meeting)
- Gift shop
- Grand Tour
- Holiday (vacation)
- Hypermobility
- Package tour
- Passport
- Perpetual traveler
- Road trip
- Roadside attraction
- Souvenir
- Staycation
- Sunday drive
- Tour guide
- Tour operator
- Tourism geography
- Tourism minister
- Tourism region
- Tourist attraction
- Tourist gateway
- Tourist trap
- Touron
- Transport
- Travel
- Travel agency
- Travel behavior
- Travel document
- Travel insurance
- Travel medicine
- Travel survey
- Travel technology
- Travel warning
- Trip planner
- Visa
- Visitor center

== Tourism organizations ==
- Trade associations
  - American Bus Association
  - American Hotel and Lodging Association
  - American Hotel & Lodging Educational Institute
  - BEST Education Network
  - Caribbean Tourism Organization
  - Destination marketing organization
  - European Travel Commission
  - South-East Asian Tourism Organisation
  - World Tourism Organization
  - World Travel and Tourism Council

== Tourism media ==
- Historical Archive on Tourism
- Tourism Radio
- Travel Channel
- World Travel Monitor

=== Tourism publications ===
- Travel and Tourism Competitiveness Report
- Wikivoyage
- Travel literature

== Persons influential in tourism ==
- Gérard Blitz (entrepreneur)
- George Bradshaw
- Thomas Cook
- Paul Dubrule and Gérard Pelisson
- Arthur Frommer
- Stelios Haji-Ioannou
- Conrad Hilton
- Michael O'Leary (businessman)
- Henry Lunn
- Roy Thomson, 1st Baron Thomson of Fleet
- Juan Trippe
- Maureen Wheeler and Tony Wheeler

== See also ==
- World Tourism Day
- World Tourism rankings

Lists

- Adjectival tourisms
- Attractions
- Bibliography
- Casino hotels
- Casinos
- Convention and exhibition centers
- Hotels
- Largest hotels in the world
- Motels
- Travel magazines
- UNESCO Intangible Cultural Heritage Lists
- World Heritage Sites by country
