= Grocery store tourism =

Leisure activity and cultural phenomenon

Grocery store tourism (or grocery tourism or supermarket tourism) is the phenomenon of visiting and purchasing items from grocery stores and supermarkets in other places. Popular choices include chips, candy, and other snacks, as well as sandwiches, drinks, and other fare. The behavior is most common in Japan, Mexico, South Korea, Thailand, France, United Kingdom, and the United States, but occurs worldwide.

== History ==
A writer for New York magazine wrote in 2019 that grocery stores were the "best secret tourist attraction", proclaiming to have learned more there than a museum. He remarked on the gritty authenticity of people-watching locals travellers rarely meet, and how being unable to read foreign language labels creates adventure. A grocery clerk directed him to a hidden ice cream shop that no one else could have done. He described Japanese department store food halls as "full-on treasure troves of culinary idiosyncrasies".

=== Modern trend ===
A writer for Food & Wine noted that "grocery store tourism" was trending on TikTok in July 2024, saying it was the best venue for a "sense of place". One TikToker stated it was the best thing to do while travelling, counts as sightseeing, a cultural experience, and opportunity for souvenirs. Many commenters agreed. The most popular items include chips of a wide variety of flavors, candy, and drinks. Guardian columnist Arwa Mahdawi affirmed the trend a week later, writing about the growing popularity of travellers visiting local supermarkets. She expressed a preference to visit a supermarket instead of a museum, and states that the former is a museum itself, exhibiting local life. She pointed out how eggs are refrigerated in the United States, but out on a shelf in the United Kingdom, due to differences in salmonella management.

A New York Times columnist reminisced about the comforts of foreign supermarkets and convenience stores in 1989, noting the familiarity of harsh lighting, breakfast cereal, laundry detergent as with those at home. She called it a "museumlike experience" of "culinary quirks and specialty foods" from other countries. More recently, it has become popular as an opportunity to see known foods in new flavors, people-watch, and learn about local palates, while keeping costs down. The article noted a boom in social media and blog posts promoting the idea. The Bucket List Company, a travel agent, conducted a study in November 2024 which found that stores in Italy, Japan, Mexico, South Korea, and Thailand were the most popular of online searches. The article author suggests that the growth in the phenomenon comes from a desire for a more authentic experience.

China Travel News pointed out the differences between tourists from China, South Korea, and the United States shopping at 7-Eleven Japan.

Time Out noted in April 2025 that there were over 50 million posts related to "grocery store travel", but that the phenomenon existed before TikTok. The author wrote about the beautiful colored tins of fish in a Portuguese supermarket as an Instagram backdrop. Supermarket tourism is seen as free from the difficulties of regular tourist attractions, such as advancing booking, queues, and ubiquity.

A writer for Skift discussed in August 2025 that grocery store tourism is often overlooked, but becoming increasingly popular due to Instagram, TikTok, and YouTube. The experience offers a "window into local culture and daily life" and a worthwhile trend. Younger travelers seek more cultural immersion, and the mix of familiarity and surprise is appealing and authentic. The article also pointed out that local brands can be more involved with travellers experiences. The Korean Tourism Organization shared a video of the top five Koran snacks, and worked with content creators to post snack-based tourism guides.

Travel + Leisure wrote in September 2025 about supermarkets becoming a "must-visit cultural stop". While it existed before social media, it has grown in recent years. Expedia reported that 39% of travellers visit supermarkets abroad and 44% want local goods unavailable at home. China Travel News reported that targeted sales for at 7-Eleven Japan tourists had doubled in 2024 from the previous year. The article also featured examples from South Korea, Thailand, the United States, the United Kingdom, and Singapore.

A Vogue Adria article in January 2026 contrasted the dreariness of going to the grocery store, while abroad, it provokes an eagerness to wander and see the daily life of locals and new products. The author notes that Japanese supermarkets have featured in viral videos for years, but has become a trend in 2026. The article then features examples from Paris, London, Milan, Japan, and South Korea.

A BBC article in August 2026 asked why tourists visit foreign supermarkets, especially in Japan. It noted that a 2026 Hilton Worldwide report found that "77% of travellers enjoy visiting grocery stores". Condé Nast Traveller named grocery tourism as one of the biggest travel trends of 2026. Noting the trend, Finnish grocer K-Supermarket listed its stores on Tripadvisor. The article stated the activity "feels wonderfully unscripted" and shows how a country lives today. Oxford experimental psychologist Charles Spence discussed the glamour of the atmosphere and environment influencing the tasting experience. Another psychologist suggested travellers seek authenticity, participation, and accessibility, as opposed to mere observation. Additionally, the familiarity of the space allows exploration.

== Impact ==
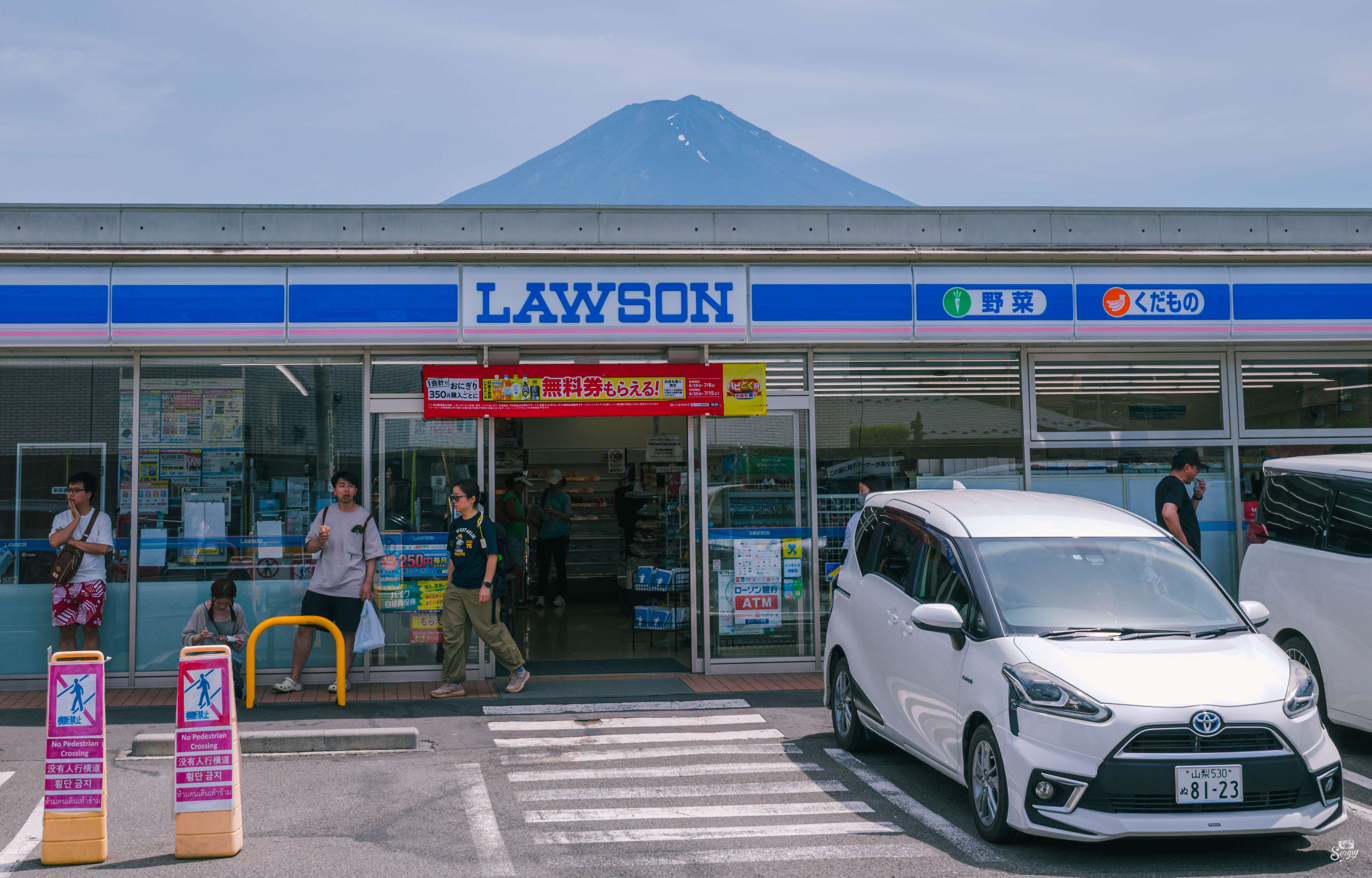
The Lawson in Fujikawaguchiko with Mount Fuji in the background.

Tourists visiting a Lawson convenience store in Fujikawaguchiko, Japan have become a nuisance taking photos of Mount Fuji behind the building. The store put up a black screen to block the view after other measures proved ineffective.

== See also ==
- Culinary tourism
- Cultural tourism
- Experiential travel
- Halal tourism
- Kosher tourism
- Wine tourism
