= List of adjectival tourisms =

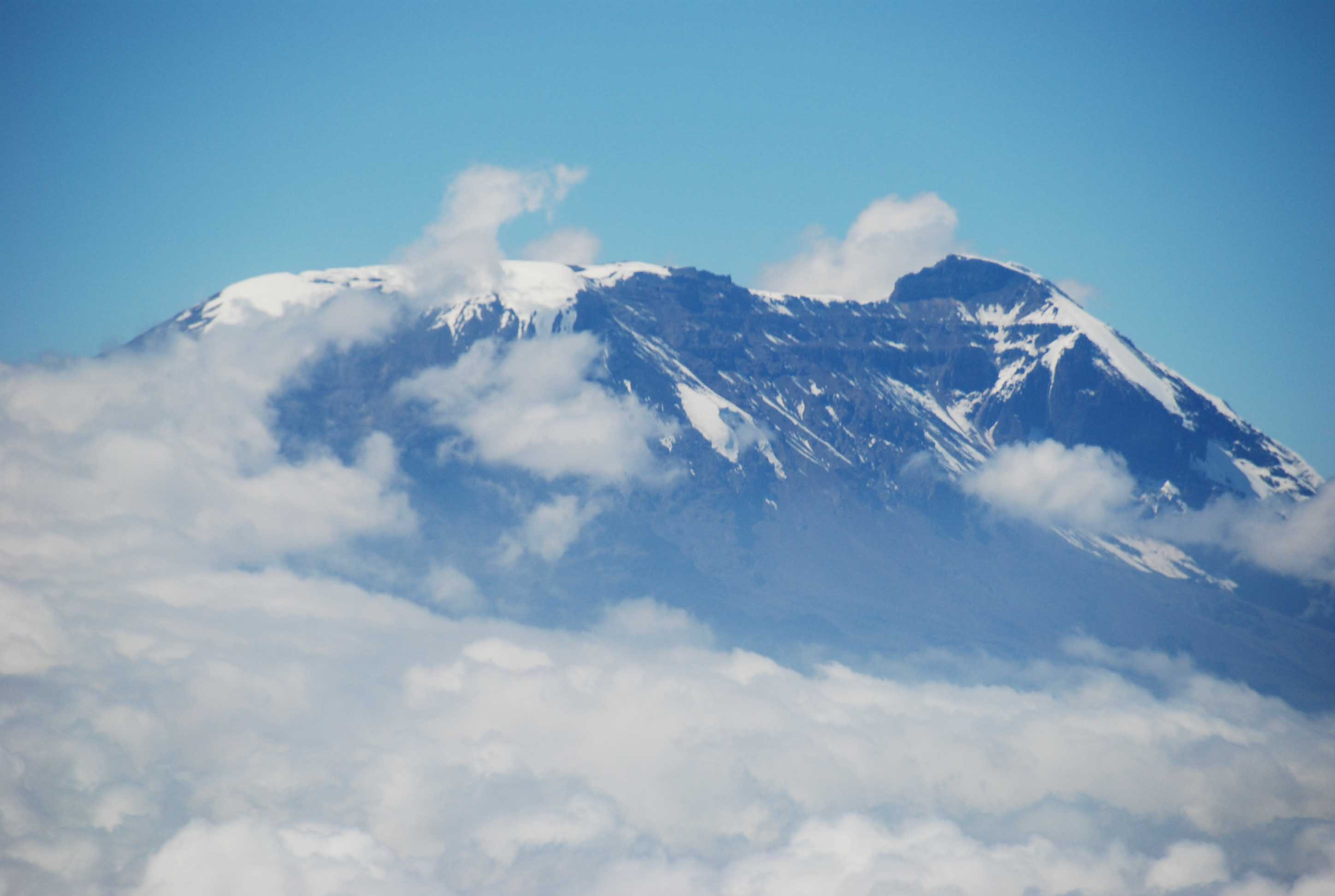
Mount Kilimanjaro in Tanzania.

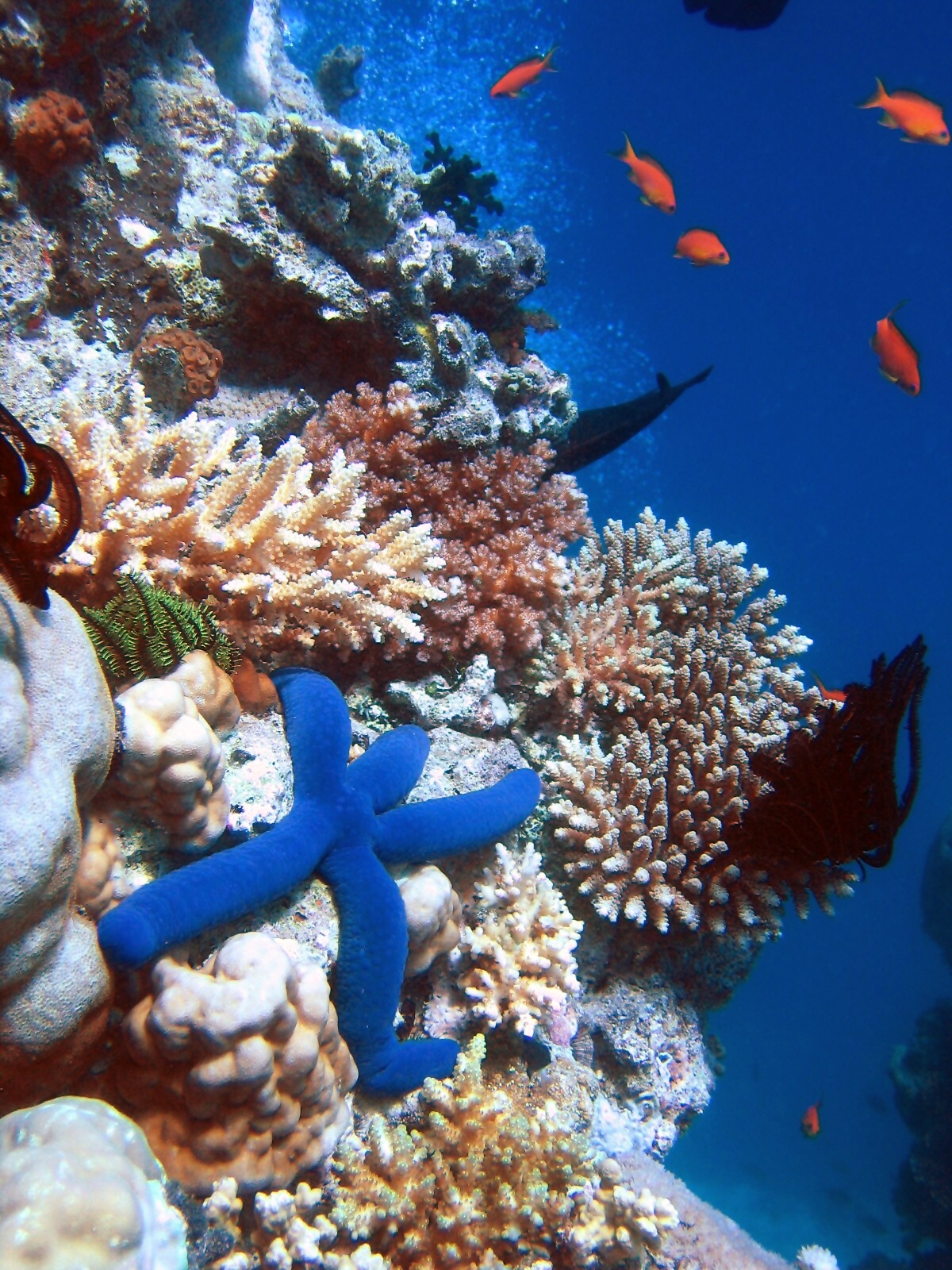
Great Barrier Reef, Australia is one of the most visited places of diving tourists.

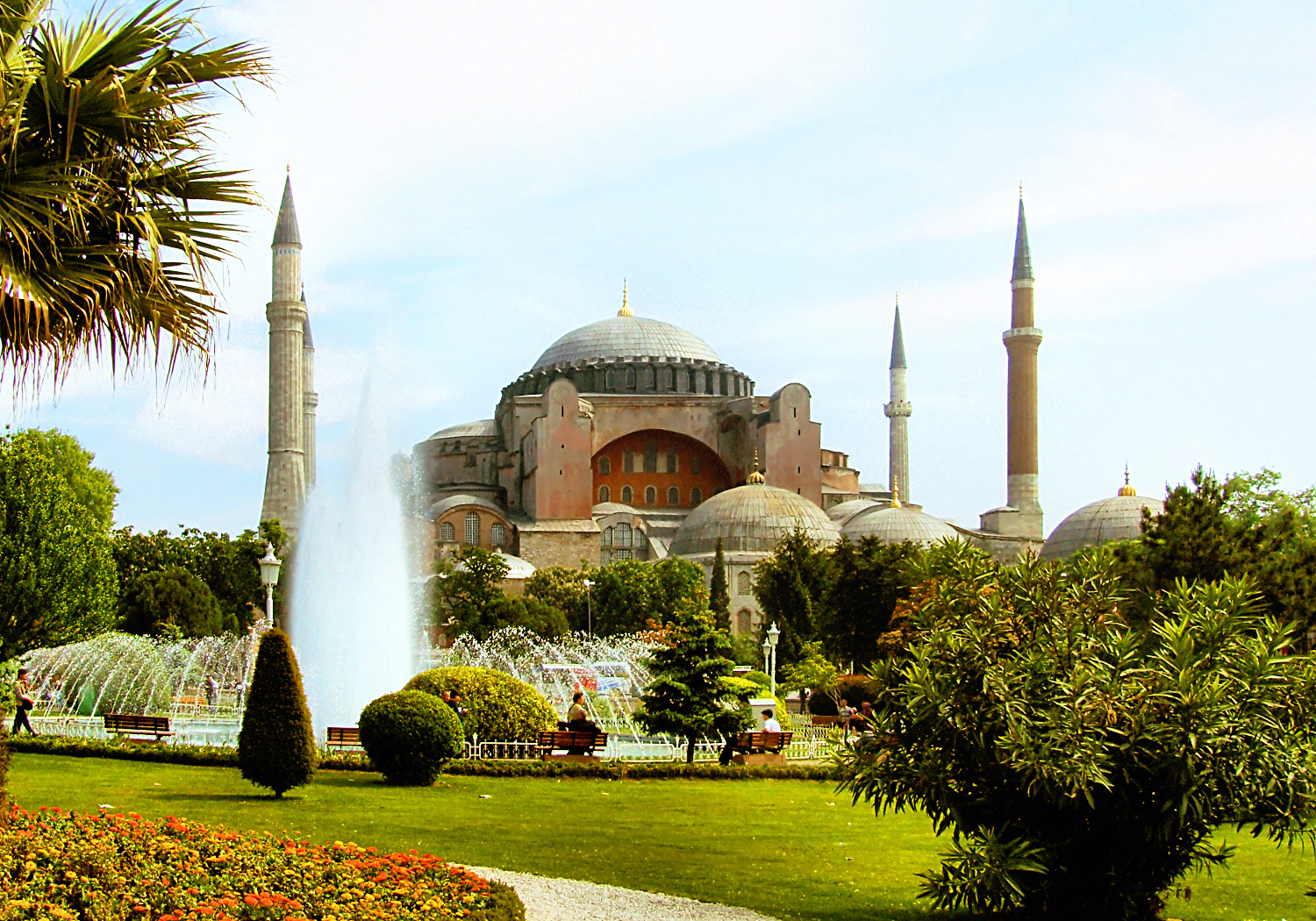
The Hagia Sophia in Istanbul, Turkey.

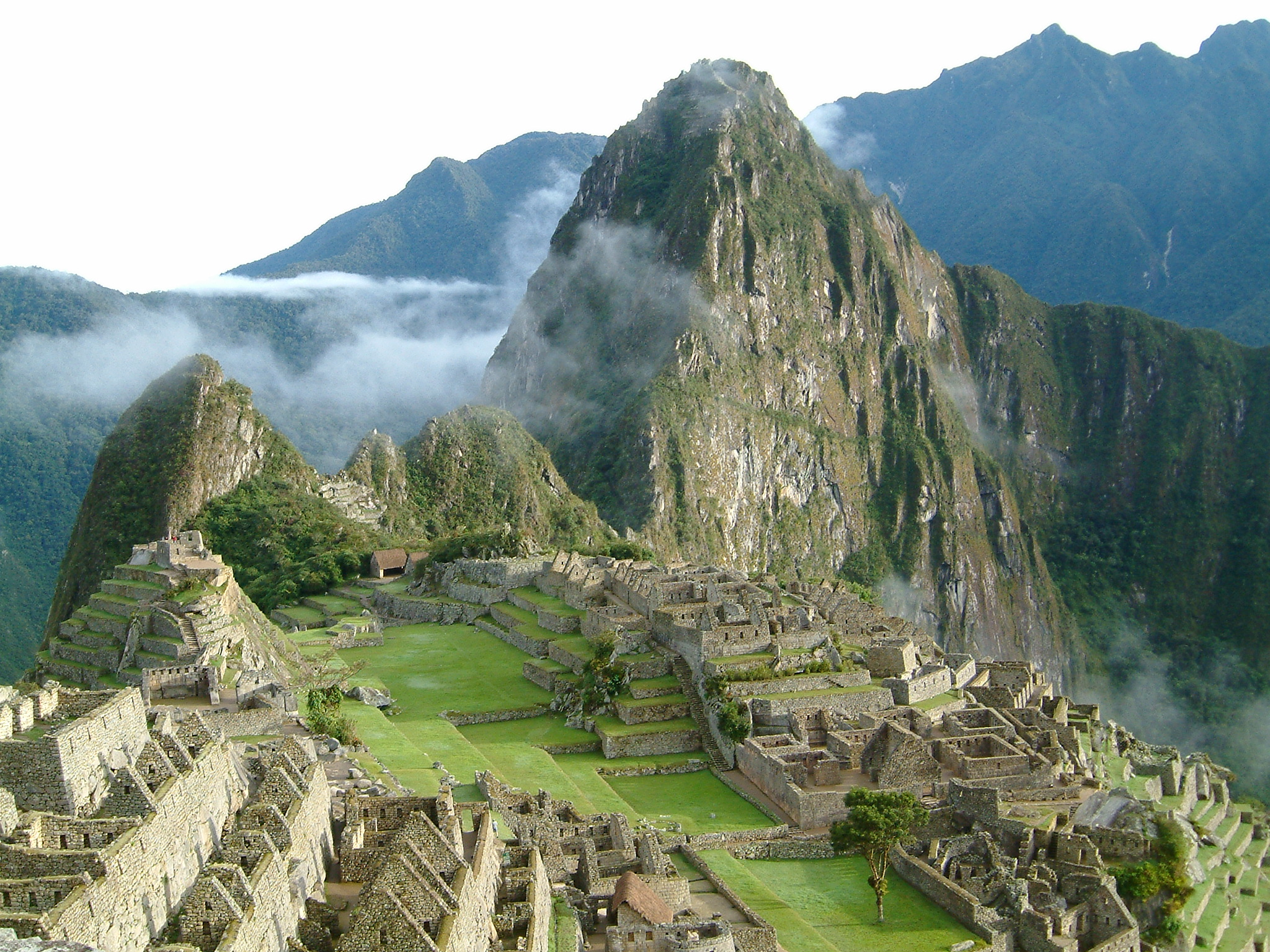
Machu Picchu in Cusco, Peru, one of the most visited destinations in South America.

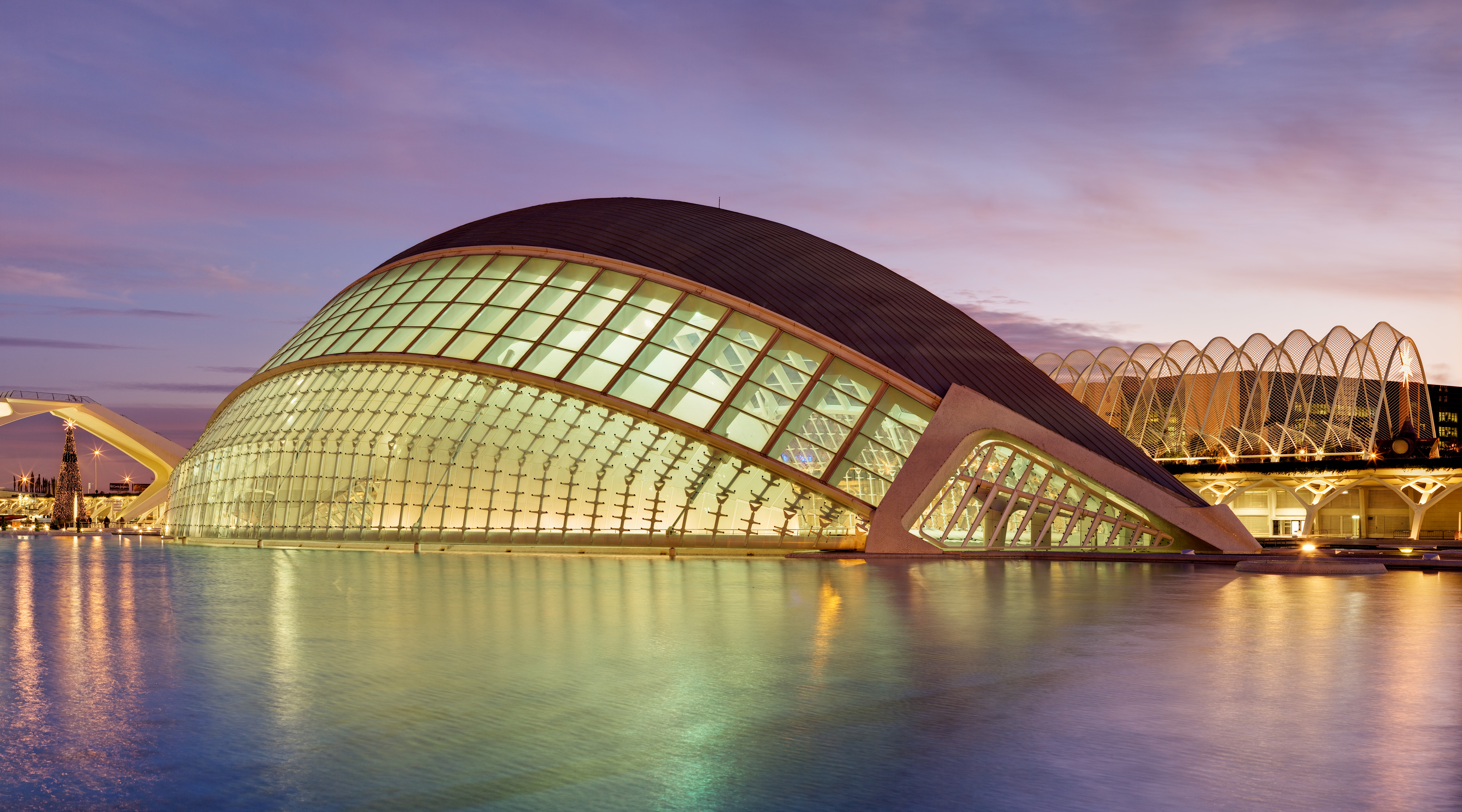
Ciutat de les Arts i les Ciències in Valencia, Spain.

Adjectival tourism is the numerous niche or specialty travel forms of tourism; each with its own adjective. The following is a list of notable types of adjectival tourism:

== Adventure and extreme ==
- Space tourism

== Culture and the arts ==
- Bookstore tourism
- Cultural tourism
- Heritage tourism
- Literary tourism
- Music tourism
- Pop-culture tourism
- Tolkien tourism

== Extralegal and illegal ==
- Drug tourism
- Female sex tourism
- Jihadi tourism
- Male sex tourism
- Suicide tourism

== Food and drink ==
- Wine tourism

== Historical ==
- Archaeological tourism
- Atomic tourism
- Genealogy tourism
- Militarism heritage tourism

== Low-impact ==
- CouchSurfing
- Ecotourism
- Geotourism
- Sustainable tourism

== Medical and dental ==
- Dental tourism
- Fertility tourism

== Miscellaneous ==
- City tourism
- Nautical tourism
- Sports tourism
- Wellness tourism

== Nature and rural ==
- Agritourism
- Garden tourism
- Jungle tourism
- Rural tourism
- Shark tourism
- Wildlife tourism

== Religious ==
- Christian tourism
- Halal tourism
- Kosher tourism

== Science and education ==
- Astronomy tourism

== Voyeuristic ==
- Dark tourism
- Disaster tourism
- Slum tourism
- War tourism
