= Xingyun =

Xingyun may refer to:

- Hsing Yun (1927–2023), Chinese Buddhist monk based in Taiwan
- Xingyun (group), Chinese e-commerce company
- Xingyun Lake, lake in Yunnan, China
