= Francis Barker & Son =

- Formerly: F. Barker & Son
- Company type: Private company
- Industry: Military equipment
- Founded: 1848; 177 years ago in Clerkenwell, London
- Founder: Francis Barker
- Defunct: 1987
- Fate: Acquired
- Successor: Pyser-SGI
- Headquarters: London later Edenbridge, Kent, United Kingdom
- Area served: United Kingdom
- Products: Military-grade compasses, binoculars, and gun sights
- Owner: Pyser-SGI (Physer Optics Ltd)

Francis Barker & Son was a British design and manufacturing company based in Edenbridge, Kent, which provides military-grade electro-optical products, search and location equipment, educational material and radio electronics which is a trademark of Pyser Optics.

The trademark became notable as a supplier of precision equipment to allied forces in Europe during the Great War and Second World War, particularly compasses and sextants.

== History ==
Francis Barker & Son was established as F. Barker & Son in Clerkenwell, London in 1848. In that same year, the proprietor entered into partnership with Richard Groves in order to manufacture precision instruments such as portable sundials and field compasses. The company moved to Clapton the next year. Beginning in the 1960s the company moved to Edenbridge and went through a series of acquisitions, before finally being acquired by its current parents, Psyer Ltd.

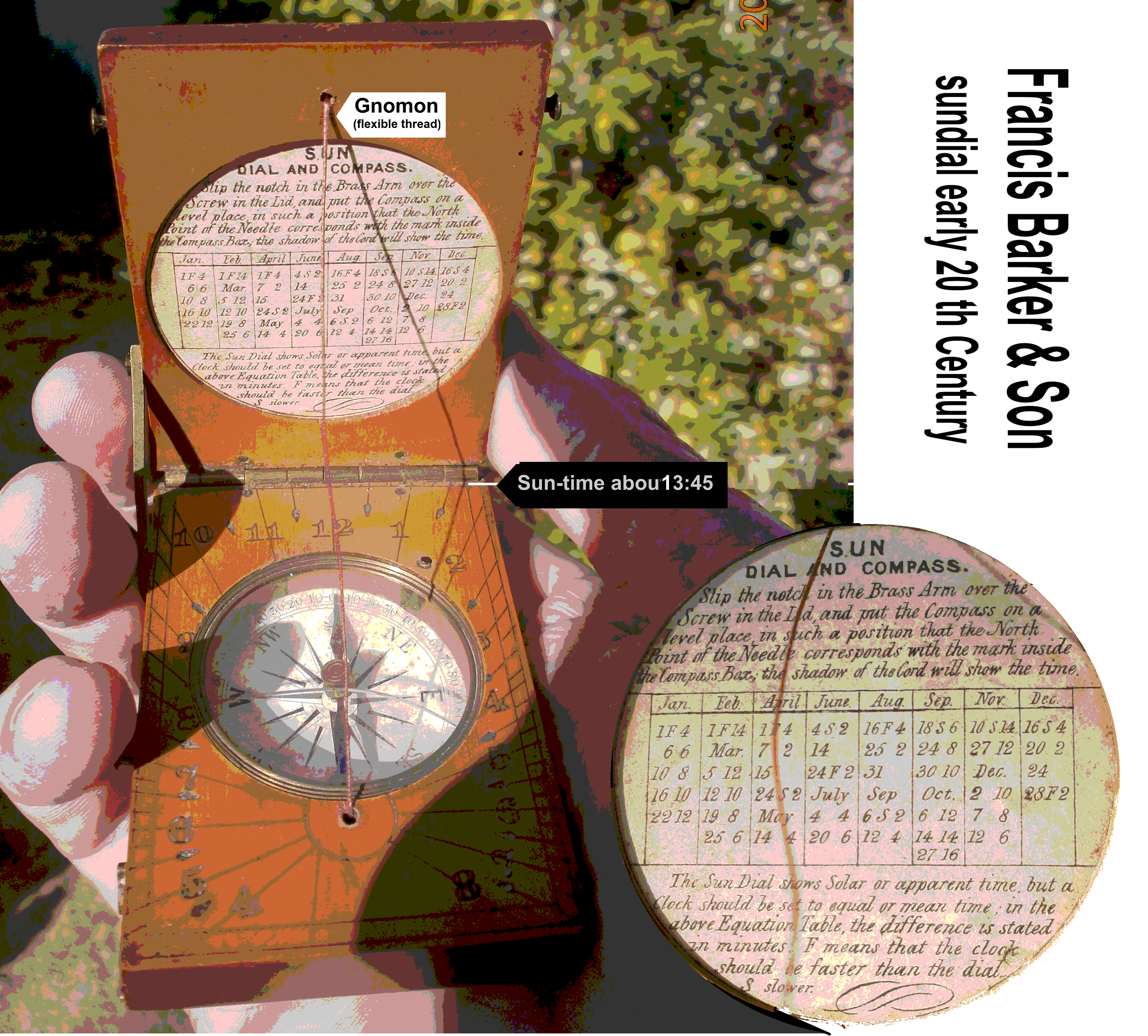
This hand-held wooden compass-sundial is unmarked, but believed to be made in London about the turn of the 19th/20th century by Francis Barker & son for field use. The crystal is cracked, and the gnomon cord has been replaced with green cotton fishing line probably in the 1950s

=== Founder ===
Francis Barker (1819–1875) worked first as a child apprentice and then later as a skilled precision mechanic and engraver, for J & G Simms, which traded between about 1882 and 1855 as makers of finely-engraved instrument dials and reticles. After founding his own company, Barker used his considerable reputation as a skilled craftsman and his early social networks as a practicing Christian and Freemason to establish his business. He later purchased his former employer, continuing to operate it separately until the death of its founders, after which he absorbed its business into his own firm.

=== Successors ===
Francis Barker (1845–1920), the son of the founder of the same name, was one of eleven children. He married Elizabeth Weeks, whose father was a maker of leather instrument cases for F. Barker instruments.

Another son of the founder, Charles, added gold and silver jewellery to the company's products in the late 19th century, notably devotional articles such as wearable crucifixes.

== External sites with images ==
- Compassipedia online compass museum Survey & Artillery section entry "Section B as Barker F"
- Scientific Collectables RGS (Royal Graphical Society) pattern compass manufactured by F Barker in the late 19th century)
- Sherwood photographic image of a Francis Barker Liquid Prismatic Compass
- F. Barker & Son British Prismatic Mk. 1 Compass
