= Hasso =

Hasso may refer to:

- Hasso von Boehmer (1904–1945), German soldier and part of the 20 July plot to assassinate Hitler
- Hasso von Manteuffel (1897–1978), German soldier and liberal politician
- Hasso Plattner (born 1944), cofounder of software company SAP AG
- Hasso Spode (born 1951), German historian and sociologist
- Hasso von Wedel (general) (1898–1961), commander of the Wehrmacht Propaganda Troops during World War II
- Hasso von Wedel (aviator) (1893–1945), German World War I flying ace
