= WhatsNew Group (Orami) =

WhatsNew Group is a Thailand based e-commerce company that is parent to multiple e-commerce brands which includes Petloft (pet care), Venbi (mom & baby), Sanoga (health), Lafema (beauty) and MOXY (women's fashion). The company leverages technology and the Internet to make home life and online shopping easier for people in Southeast Asia. Headquartered in Bangkok, WhatsNew Group sells both international and local brands under each e-commerce vertical. It is one of the portfolio companies of Ardent Capital, a venture capitalist based in Thailand. As of January 2016, the company merged with Bilna, Indonesia's e-commerce platform for mothers and announced a regional rebrand to the name Orami.

== History ==
The company was seed funded by Ardent Capital in early 2013 and was modelled after Quidsi, Inc. in the US following its acquisition by Amazon for $550 million on November 8, 2010. Petloft was the first company built by WhatsNew co-founders Harprem Doowa and Sarah Huang, who are no longer with the company and have their new business. The company later built Venbi and Lafema to serve their growing female customer base and acquired Sanoga within a year. In December 2014, WhatsNew Group acquired ilovemoxy, an online lifestyle shop started by Shannon Kalayanamitr, a serial entrepreneur based in Bangkok who later joined WhatsNew Group as their Chief Marketing Officer.

== Controversy ==
The company was reported by Tech in Asia as a Thai startup launching to compete directly against Rocket Internet in the Southeast Asian e-commerce market.

== Expansion and Company Rebrand ==
WhatsNew Group announced mid-2015 that they would be expanding to Indonesia under the new name MOXY. The company's decision to consolidate their e-commerce verticals under one brand was based on their large female customer base, the growing female economy and focus on creating a strong brand. In a series of moves to expand regionally, Jérémy Fichet, the former co-founder and managing director of Cdiscount was officiated as the company's new Group CEO.

MOXY Indonesia is Southeast Asia's first business-to-consumer women-focused e-commerce platform. The online destination offers products catered specifically to the country's female demographic and totes the tagline, "Have it all". To service the unique e-commerce infrastructure in Southeast Asia, MOXY provides cash on delivery, among other methods of payment, in over 250 cities across Indonesia.

On February 24, 2016, MoxyBilna announced $15 million in funding from Facebook Inc. co-founder Eduardo Saverin, Sinar Mas Group, Shanghai-based Gobi Partners, Velos Partners and Ardent Capital LLC. The company has begun their transition to the name Orami in order to unify their brand regionally. The rebrand will be complete by Q3 of 2016.
