= Tour-realism =

Tour-realism (T.R.) is a new trend in alternative tourism. It differs from both mass tourism and "independent tourism", a type of tourism involving absolutely no mediators in the tour organization.

T.R. operators usually represent the country they live and work in. T.R. operators are known for having advanced knowledge of the culture and history of their country, as well as for having tight and constant connections with local population. Because they are residents of the country, T.R. operators are capable of providing unique services for foreign guests.

== Characteristics ==
Tour-realism, as a tourism subgenre, tends to have certain defining characteristics. Tour-realism is generally done in small groups of 3-5 people, usually family members or groups of friends. The approach is individualized (not reliant on standard itineraries) and focuses on high-quality offerings, with flexible choice of apartments and excursions that depend on the demands and wishes of the client. Accommodations are most often private villas, cottages etc., with an emphasis on creating an authentic experience as befits the culture and locale, again dependent on the wishes of the client. "Extras" in terms of excursions and services are built-in to create a personalized, unique experience for the client, and outings will include both the well-known and the obscure.
