= Belimau =

Malay Islamic bathing tradition

The Belimau bath is a Malay Indonesian tradition, observed in order to welcome the month of Ramadan, especially in Bangka Belitung and Riau provinces. The tradition has been carried down for generations among the Minangkabau people before Islam arrived in Indonesia, as they were praciticing Hinduism, whereby this ceremony could have been inspired by Makara Sankranti.

Belimau consists of washing or bathing for physical and spiritual purification using limau water.

In the Pacific Islands, the Belimau tradition ended about 300 years ago, but it was revived around 2006. Since then, local governments have promoted the Belimau bath tradition as a part of religious tourism. The Belimau Bath ceremony is held once a year, one week before Ramadan.

== See also ==
- Ramadan in Indonesia
- Islam in Indonesia
