= Gobi Partners =

Asian venture capital firm

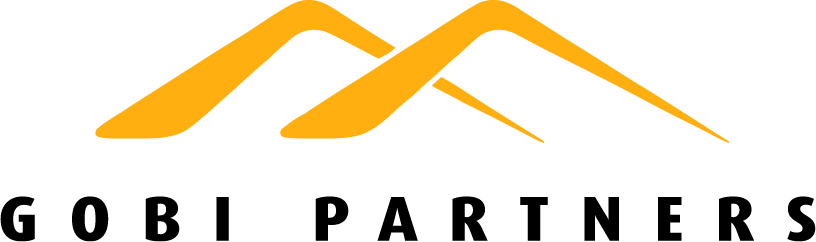
- Type: Private
- Industry: Venture capital
- Founded: 2002; 24 years ago
- Founders: Thomas Tsao; Lawrence Tse; Wai Kit Lau
- Headquarters: Kuala Lumpur, Malaysia; Hong Kong
- Key people: Thomas Tsao (Chairperson)
- AUM: US$1.6 billion (2024)
- Website: www.gobi.vc

Gobi Partners (Gobi) is an Asian venture capital (VC) firm headquartered in Kuala Lumpur, Malaysia and Hong Kong. The firm focuses mainly on investments in China and Southeast Asia.

== History ==
Gobi was founded in 2002 by Thomas Tsao, Lawrence Tse and Wai Kit Lau who were previously employees at WI Harper, a San Francisco VC firm. The three who had different professions in banking, engineering and law before by training were all Chinese speakers which gave the team an advantage in negotiations and conference calls. They registered the firm in the Cayman Islands and named it after the Gobi Desert. The co-founders funded Gobi with $3 million of their own money and agreed not to take salaries until an investment paid off. It took six months of research before the firm made its first investment.

In 2003, Gobi started fundraising for its inaugural fund. The fundraising closed in October 2005 with $50 million raised. Sierra Ventures joined Gobi Partners as a strategic partner and invested $10 million in the fund. Gobi's co-founders were set to return to return the capital they raised to limited partners but the firm's partnership with Sierra Ventures ended that notion. Other investors included IBM, Nippon Telegraph and Telephone, Docomo, McGraw Hill and The Walt Disney Company.

During the 2000s, Gobi was one of the earliest VC firms to invest in China's technology companies. At the time it was considered very risky as wasn't even clear that China would permit widespread Internet use, much less let people build businesses around it. Very few investment firms made any moves in China at the time.

In 2010, Gobi Partners extend its presence into Southeast Asia making it one of the earliest Chinese firms to do so. Chinese investments of Gobi such as Tuniu and Camera 360 already attracted a user base in Southeast Asia which drew huge potential of the market to the firm. Tsao stated he thought Southeast Asia in 2010 resembled China in 2002. Gobi set up its first Southeast Asia Fund where the Media Development Authority was an investor. In March 2016, Gobi raised a new fund of $14.5 million to invest in technology companies in the region. There was a focus on Taqwa Technology projects that were specifically for Muslims such as Tripfez Travel.

In November 2015, Alibaba Group selected Gobi to manage its $130 million fund to invest in Hong Kong startups.

In March 2019, Gobi and Pakistan VC firm Fatima Ventures created a joint venture named Fatima Gobi Ventures. It raised $20 million in its first fund at the end of 2019 to invest in Pakistani startups. In May 2024, Gobi stated it was looking for more opportunities in Pakistan. This was due to its young population, increasing internet and mobile banking adoption, its government's effort to make a conducive environment for investors and finally China–Pakistan relations. In December 2024, Gobi stated there were plans to raise $50 million for a second fund which would be the largest of its kind in Pakistan. Black Sheep Restaurants is reported to be an investor in the fund.

In December 2022, Gobi stated its next target for Chinese investments was in the Guangdong–Hong Kong–Macao Greater Bay Area (GBA). Its previous investments in Hong Kong and mainland China put it in a position to capitalize on the formation of the GBA.

== Operations ==
Gobi Partners was originally headquartered in Shanghai before later becoming dual headquartered in Kuala Lumpur, Malaysia and Hong Kong.

Notable investments made by Gobi include Animoca Brands, GOGOX, Prenetics, WeLab, Xingyun and Airwallex.
