= Wristcheck =

Online watch marketplace

- Establishment: 2020, by Austen Chu and Sean Wong
- Industry: Luxury Goods, E-Commerce Platform, Watch Retail
- Headquarters: Hong Kong
- Key People: Founder & CEO Austen Chu, Co-founder Sean Wong
- Products/Services: Watch Consignment, Pre-Owned and Brand New Luxury Watches, Watch Authentication. Watch Servicing
- Website: www.wristcheck.com

Wristcheck is a Hong Kong-based omnichannel platform for buying, selling, and trading pre-owned luxury watches. Founded in 2020 by Austen Chu and Sean Wong, the company operates an e-commerce marketplace and physical showrooms.

== History ==
The company was founded by Austen Chu and Sean Wong. Chu's interest in watches began at a young age, and he has cited Jay-Z's references to Audemars Piguet as an early influence. In 2016, at age 18, Chu started the watch-focused Instagram account @horoloupe, which grew to over 100,000 followers. Through the online community, he identified a need for a more trustworthy and transparent platform for pre-owned watches.

In late 2019, Chu partnered with Sean Wong, then a senior vice president at Hypebeast, who led its e-commerce division, HBX. They co-founded Wristcheck in 2020. The company launched its e-commerce platform and its first physical showroom in Hong Kong's Landmark Atrium in August 2021.

In January 2023, Wristcheck announced it had raised US$8 million in a seed funding round. The round was led by Gobi Partners GBA, which manages the Alibaba Hong Kong Entrepreneurs Fund, with participation from K3 Ventures. The company received a US$5 million investment from Jay-Z in July 2024, followed by an investment from Kylian Mbappé through his firm, Coalition Capital, in February 2025.

== Business model ==
Wristcheck operates as a curated marketplace that positions itself as a direct competitor to traditional watch dealers by addressing the market's historical lack of regulation and transparency. The company's model is built on disclosing its fees to both buyers and sellers.

A core feature is its in-house authentication process. Every watch listed on the platform is inspected and graded by a team of Swiss-trained watchmakers to verify its condition and authenticity. The company expanded to Macau with a store at the Wynn Macau resort in March 2025. Its first U.S. location, an appointment-only showroom, opened at 18 Harrison Street in New York City's Tribeca neighbourhood in July 2025.

The company's business model combines its online platform with physical locations in Hong Kong, Macau and New York City. Wristcheck has received venture capital funding from Gobi Partners and K3 ventures, as well as investments from public figures including American entrepreneur Jay-Z and French Professional footballer Kylian Mbappé.

== Locations ==
Wristcheck's first showroom opened at the Landmark Atrium in Hong Kong in August 2021.
