= Tripfez Travel =

Malaysian travel websites

- Company type: Privately held company
- Website type: Travel agent Metasearch engine
- Available in: English (US, UK), Malay, Indonesian, German, Chinese, Spanish, French
- Founded: 2012; 14 years ago
- Headquarters: Kuala Lumpur, Malaysia
- Area served: Worldwide
- Founder: Faeez Fadhlillah; Juergen Gallistl
- Industry: Travel agency Halal tourism
- Website: www.tripfez.com/en
- Registration: No
- Launched: March 23, 2013; 13 years ago

Tripfez Travel (also simply known as Tripfez; formerly Lagisatu.com) is an online travel agency and metasearch engine focusing on Muslims and Halal tourism.

It has a rating system which rates and allows users to rate travel services and facilities based on Muslim needs for religious amenities such as whether or not the service offers halal food, prayer rugs, pre-sunrise breakfast services during Ramadan, and Qibla direction. It has a certification process for hotels that scores the properties by how compliant they are to the expectations of observant Muslims.

== History ==
Lagisatu.com was founded in 2012 and launched in March 2013 by Faeez Fadhlillah and Juergen Gallistl as the first travel metasearch engine focused on Halal tourism. At first, it focused on hotels.

In December 2014, the company launched mobile apps for iOS and Android.

In 2018, the company merged with HolidayMe.

In March 2016, the company relaunched as Tripfez Travel.

== Awards and recognition ==
Lagisatu.com won the startup of the year award during Northstar Travel Group's 2013 WebInTravel Awards in Indonesia.

Lagisatu.com was one of the finalist for the Asia Pacific Travel Innovation Award by Travel Mole in June 2013.

In December 2013, Lagisatu.com won 2 NEF-Awani ICT awards, which honor ICT businesses and creative entrepreneurs: Best in E-commerce and Best Young Technopreneur.
