= Alternative Tourism Group =

Alternative Tourism Group and Study Center (ATG) is a Palestinian NGO based in Beit Sahour (Bethlehem) that specialises in tours and pilgrimages that include critical examinations of the history, culture, and politics of the Holy Land.

ATG was established in 1995 by the late Jamal Salameh, Majed Nassar, Rifat Odeh Kassis, Ghassan Andoni and Elias Rishmawi, and operates according to the tenets of fair trade and justice tourism — that is, tourism that holds as its central goals the creation of economic opportunities for the local community, positive cultural exchange between guest and host through one-on-one interaction, the protection of the environment, and political/historical education.

ATG encourages tourism operators to abandon exploitative mass tourism and to adopt practices that positively affect the host population in Palestine. Through these methods, ATG seeks to promote a positive image of Palestine and its people and to contribute to the establishment of a durable peace in the area.

== Programs ==
ATG's programs include:

- the Olive Picking Campaign in October, in which Internationals help local farmers during the olive harvest to reach their olive trees which are located near the Israeli separation barrier and the Israeli Jewish settlements.
- the Olive Tree Planting Campaign each February. This aims to planting trees (mainly olive trees) in the lands which are threatened to be confiscated by the Israeli authorities.
- Bed & Breakfast at local houses around Bethlehem, where visitors get direct contact with Palestinians at their homes.
- the Nativity Trail Program which is a walking tour from Nazareth to Bethlehem. Participants can enjoy the nature of Palestine, visit Palestinian villages, refugee camps, meet farmers, villagers, enjoy the Palestinian hospitality and follow the steps of Joseph and Mary in their journey to Bethlehem.

== Awards ==
ATG won the TO DO AWARD 2006 at Berlin's International Tourism Bourse for social responsible tourism.

== Publications ==
ATG published “Palestine & Palestinians”, the first comprehensive Palestinian guidebook to Palestine, including the occupied territories, Jerusalem, the 1948 territories and the Syrian Golan Heights.

== Networking ==
ATG initiated a network called the Palestinian Initiative for Responsible Tourism which published the Code of Conduct in the Holy Land. ATG is Member of the Palestinian Non-Governmental Organizations Network (PNGO).

== See also ==
- Alternative tourism
