= CrescentRating =

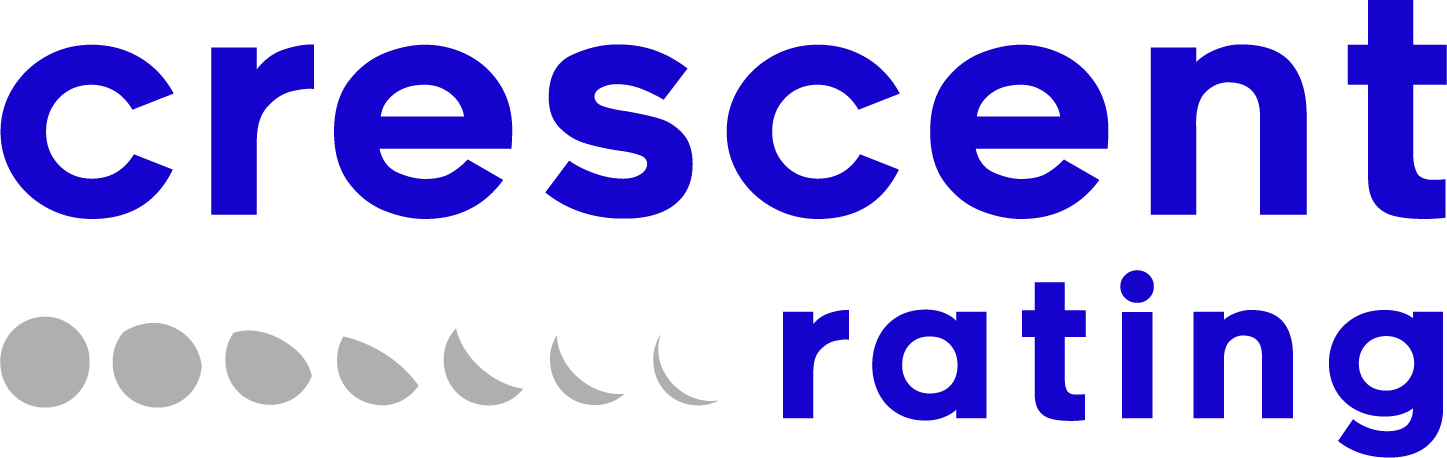
- Company type: Private
- Industry: Tourism
- Founded: 2008
- Founder: Fazal Bahardeen
- Headquarters: Singapore
- Area served: Worldwide
- Key people: Fazal Bahardeen (CEO)
- Website: crescentrating.com

CrescentRating is a Singapore-based research organization that researches Halal travel.

== Overview ==
CrescentRating researches Halal travel and publishes related rankings. It was founded by Fazal Bahardeen and is based in Singapore.

== History ==
Founded in 2008 in Singapore by Fazal Bahardeen who identified a need in the tourism sector for better accommodation of Muslim travelers. Initially, the company focused on rating establishments based on their compatibility with Muslim requirements. Later, it expanded its services by introducing online platforms such as HalalTrip and the Muslim Travel Warehouse in 2015.

Between 2011 and 2014 CrescentRating released an annual list of countries ranked by their accommodations for Muslim travelers. This project collaborated with Mastercard in 2015, becoming the Global Muslim Travel Index.

In August 2013 CrescentRating launched a mobile app called Crescent Trips, designed to notify Muslims of prayer times and the direction to face during prayers.

In December 2013 CrescentRating introduced HalalTrip.com, a website for Muslim travelers that featured an international directory of halal restaurants and city guides. Later, in 2015, CrescentRating released a mobile app for the HalalTrip website.

In April 2016 CrescentRating began collaborating with the Philippine Department of Tourism (PDOT) to promote halal tourism in the Philippines.

In 2023 CrescentRating's Global Muslim Travel Index (GMTI) report introduced a new tool that gives details on Muslim Women Friendly Destinations.

CrescentRating also provides training to tourism and hotel boards and collaborates with organizations such as IE Singapore and the city of Fukuoka, Japan on research projects.

Over the years, CrescentRating has conducted multiple research studies and published guidebooks. Notable studies include a study for the Organization of Islamic Cooperation (OIC), another in collaboration with the Singapore Center for Studies in Innovation, Productivity and Technology and Murdoch University, a study on halal dining, and a guidebook specifically for Muslim tourists visiting Jeju Island in South Korea.

CrescentRating also hosts the Halal in Travel Awards annually.
