= Alternative tourism =

Form of tourism

Alternative tourism combines tourist products or individual tourist services, different from mass tourism by means of supply, organization and the human resources involved. Other examples of different terms include "intelligent" or "motivated tourism." In addition, "anti-tourism" or "participative tourism" are some others. It's centered around natural, social, and community value in which allow both host and guest to enjoy positive, worthwhile and shared experience.

Alternative tourism in rural areas and indigenous territories has been promoted in countries like Mexico as a local development strategy that can be integrated with environmental conservation.

== Forms ==
The term "alternative tourism" tries to include the concepts of active tourism as well as explorer and encounter travel even with the concept of committed tourism. The following lists try to enumerate some of the styles of alternative tourism.

=== Active tourism ===
- hiking
- trekking
- biking
- adventure tourism
- snowshoeing
- ski mountaineering
- rafting
- diving
- caving
- climbing
- horseback riding

=== Explore and encounter travel ===
- historical places
- archeological sites
- foreign communities
- foreign cultures
- rural tourism
- ecotourism
- cultural and historical heritage
- wine
- traditional cuisine
- ethnography
- traditional music
- handicrafts

=== Committed tourism ===
- voluntary service overseas
- aid and assistance
- archeological digs
- international work camps
- justice
- solidarity tourism
- religion

== Terminology critiques ==
Since the term alternative is ambiguous, there are numerous critical remarks stating that the concept is only " (...) a fashionable idea among those who are dissatisfied with the nature of mass tourism (...)". The critics state, that alternative tourism lacks a clear definition of what is the tourism style alternative to. The origins of the term can be found in two alternating concepts:

- Rejection of modern mass consumerism
- Concern about the social impact in third-world countries

Others express their critical opinions regarding the term as fetish-adjective, miracle-word, mythical-term.

== See also ==
- Alternative Tourism Group (in Palestine)
- Tourismphobia
