= Austen Chu =

Chinese businessman

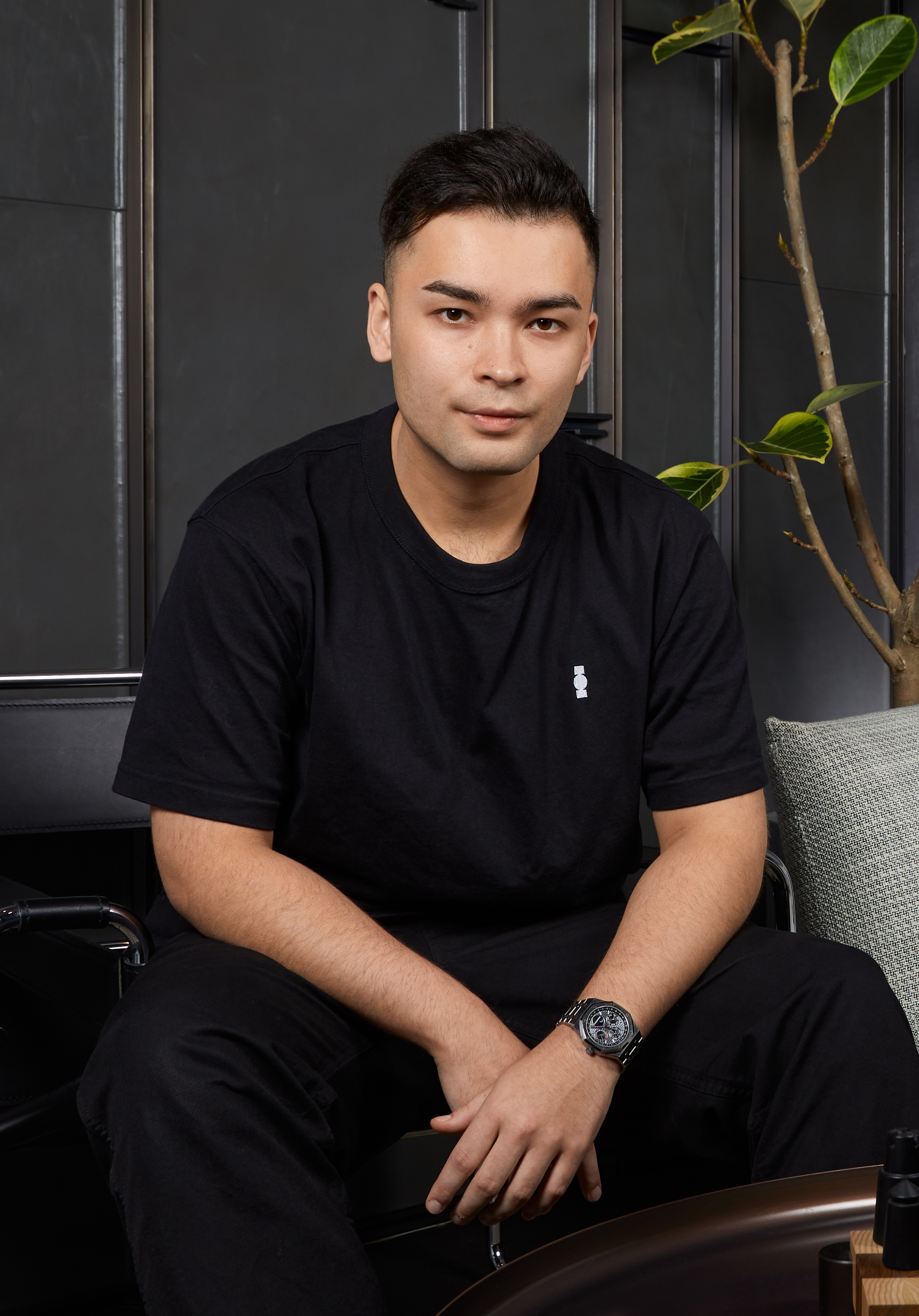
- Austen Chu in 2023
- Occupations: Entrepreneur, watch collector
- Known for: Founder of Wristcheck
- Website: wristcheck.com

Austen Chu is a Hong Kong-born entrepreneur, watch collector, and influencer. He is the founder and CEO of Wristcheck (wristcheck.com), a luxury watch marketplace based in Hong Kong and New York. Chu is also known for his Instagram account @horoloupe, where he shares insights into watch collecting and industry trends. Notable investors in Wristcheck include rapper Jay-Z and footballer Kylian Mbappé.

== Career ==
Chu began his watch collecting journey at a young age and launched the Instagram account @horoloupe in 2016, which quickly gained attention in the global watch community. He bought his first Audemars Piguet Royal Oak at age 18.

In 2020, Chu co-founded Wristcheck with Sean Wong, aiming to bring transparency and accessibility to the secondary watch market. The platform has grown into a prominent watch marketplace with locations in Hong Kong and New York. In 2024, rapper Jay-Z and French footballer Kylian Mbappé were revealed as early investors.

Chu also collaborated with Audemars Piguet in 2020 to design the Royal Oak Perpetual Calendar China Edition, a limited edition of 88 pieces created exclusively for the Chinese market.

In 2023, Chu was included in Forbes Asia's 30 Under 30 list in the Retail & E-commerce category. Wristcheck raised $13.6 million across multiple rounds with backers including the Alibaba Entrepreneurs Fund, Gobi Partners GBA, and K3 Ventures.
