= Tuniu =

Tuniu Corporation
- Native name: 途牛旅游网
- Company type: Public
- Traded as: NASDAQ: TOUR
- Industry: Tourism
- Founded: 2006
- Headquarters: Nanjing, China
- Key people: Donald Dunde Yu (CEO and co-founder) Alex Haifeng Yan (COO and co-founder)
- Services: Packaged tours, accommodation reservation, airline and railway ticketing, car rentals, corporate travel
- Revenue: USD$1.6 billion (2015)
- Number of employees: 8000
- Website: www.tuniu.com

Tuniu Corporation (Chinese: 途牛旅游网) is a Chinese online travel agency. The company was listed on the Nasdaq Stock Exchange on May 9, 2014. Its headquarters are located in Nanjing, with offices in Shanghai and Beijing.

== History ==
Founded in 2006 in Nanjing by CEO Donald Dunde Yu and COO Alex Haifeng Yan, the company was fully incorporated on June 1, 2008.

On May 9, 2014, Tuniu was listed on the Nasdaq Stock Exchange under TOUR, co-managed by Morgan Stanley & Co, Credit Suisse Securities LLC and China Renaissance Securities. Tuniu raised $72 million in its initial public offering, pricing 8 million shares at $9 per share. CEO Donald Dunde Yu rang the opening bell at the Nasdaq MarketSite in Times Square.

In April 2015, Tuniu was the subject of a boycott by seventeen Chinese travel agencies over a pricing dispute. The issue was settled a few days later following an investigation by the China National Tourism Administration, with partner relations returning to normal. Tuniu's share price fell 4.7% following news of the dispute.

On August 23, 2016, Tuniu's Board of Directors authorized a share repurchase program to repurchase up to $150 million worth of shares. Tuniu's share price had fallen below opening price.

In August 2024, Tuniu and Tourism Authority of Thailand partnered to boost tourism in preparation for the 50th anniversary of Thailand-China diplomacy.

== Investments and acquisitions ==
On July 1, 2014, Ctrip CEO James Jianzhang Liang was appointed to Tuniu's board of directors. Consequently, on December 10, 2014, Tuniu and Ctrip signed a strategic collaboration agreement to share travel resources.

On December 15, 2014, Tuniu announced $148 million investment in aggregate from a group that included the investment arms of Hony Capital, JD.com, Ctrip Investment Holding Ltd, and the personal holding companies of Tuniu's CEO and COO. Ctrip acquired $15 million Tuniu shares during their IPO, and currently owns over 3% of Tuniu's outstanding shares.

In May 2015, Tuniu announced the investment of $500 million from a group of investors led by JD.com. JD.com became the largest shareholder in Tuniu with 27.5% stake.

On March 9, 2015, Tuniu announced the acquisition of majority stakes in two Chinese travel agencies, Hangzhou-based Zhejiang Zhongshan International Services and Tianjin-based China Classical Holiday.

On January 21, 2016, Tuniu announced the completion of a US$500 million investment from HNA Tourism Group. Transaction purchase price was US$5.50 per Class A ordinary share. HNA Tourism Group bought 24.1% share of Tuniu.

== Brand ambassadors ==
In July 2016, Tuniu announced the signing of Taiwanese pop stars Jay Chou and Jimmy Lin as its celebrity brand ambassadors.
