= Sports tourism =

Tourists observing or participating in sports

Sports tourism refers to travel which involves either observing or participating in a sporting event while staying apart from the tourists' usual environment. Sport tourism is one of the fastest-growing sectors of the global travel industry and equates to $7.68 billion.

Travellers attending sports tournaments, races, and other events – either as a participant or spectator – generate significant economic benefits to households, businesses, and governments alike and represent a critical driver of the overall economy”.

Destinations leverage major events to boost visibility, ramp up infrastructure, and attract visitors beyond the events themselves. This effective combination of brand exposure, financial benefits, and fan enthusiasm fuels the industry’s growth.

== Classification of sport tourism ==
There are several classifications of sport tourism. Gammon and Robinson suggested that sports tourism can be categorized as Hard Sports Tourism or Soft Sports Tourism, while Gibson suggested that there are three types of sports tourism: Sports Event Tourism, Celebrity and Nostalgia Sport Tourism and Active Sport Tourism.

=== Hard and soft sport tourism ===
The "hard" definition of sport tourism refers to the quantity of people participating at a competitive sport events. Normally these kinds of events are the motivation that attract visitors to the events. Olympic Games, FIFA World Cup, F1 Grand Prix and regional events such as the NASCAR Cup Series could be described as hard sports tourism. It is a common misconception that cities hosting such major sports events see a surge in travelers during the event.

The "soft" definition of sport tourism is when the tourist travels to participate in recreational sporting, or signing up for leisure interests. Hiking, skiing, running and canoeing can be described as soft sports tourism. Perhaps the most common form of soft sports tourism involves golf in regards to destinations in Europe and the United States. A large number of people are interested in playing some of the world's greatest and highest ranked courses, and take great pride in checking those destinations off of their list of places to visit.

Youth Sports Tourism

One aspect of sector sports tourism is the youth sports tourism market; this sector grew by a reported 55 percent from 2010 to 2017 and is worth an estimated $19 billion — more than the revenue of the NFL or NBA. Youth sports tourism is largely propelled by tournaments for travel teams; these include those put on by Little League Baseball, Amateur Athletic Union of the United States (AAU), United States Youth Soccer Association and others.

The economic impact of youth sports events can vary according to the number of participants; one of the largest recorded youth events in 2024 was the 51st AAU Junior National Volleyball Championships in Orlando, Florida, which made $760.8 million and used 95,000 room nights over the course of the 24-day tournament. The tournament attracted 117,000 athletes and coaches.

Sports Events and Tourism Association, a non-profit 501(c)3 trade association for the sport tourism industry in the United States, estimates that in 2023, the sports tourism sector had a total economic impact of $128 billion.

College Sports Tourism

Another sector of sports tourism industry is that of college sports. The National Collegiate Athletic Association, Central Intercollegiate Athletic Association, National Junior College Athletic Association and others all offer competitive bid processes to cities interested in hosting. In October 2024, the NCAA announced more than 240 host sites for preliminary and final rounds of predetermined championships across Divisions I, II and III, primarily for the 2026-27 and 2027-28 seasons.

Entities Involved in Sports Tourism

Convention and visitors bureaus, chambers of commerce and sports commissions (destination marketing organizations designed to attract sports business) are examples of public/private partnerships that represent cities in the bidding process with event owners and rights holders.

=== Sporting event tourism ===
Sports event tourism refers to the visitors who visit a city to watch events. The two events that attract the most tourists worldwide are the Olympics and the FIFA World Cup. These events held once every four years, in a different city in the world. Sport tourism in the United States is more focused on events that happen annually. The major event for the National Football League is the Super Bowl, held at the end of the year in different city every year. Even though the National Hockey League started the annual NHL Winter Classic game in 2008, the 2014 New Year's outdoor hockey game rivaled the Stanley Cup Tournament in popularity and "revitalized the NHL". As of 2015, the newest trend in college basketball was to start the season off with annual tournaments such as the Maui Invitational held in Hawaii, and the Battle for Atlantis which is played in the Bahamas. This idea of pairing quality sports events with the Bahamas attractions raised the island's profile and brought in more visitors and dollars to the country. The Battle for Atlantis brought more than 5,000 fans in during Thanksgiving week for the three-day tournament. The event helped to increase hotel capacity from what is typically around 60 percent this time of year to 90 percent. Sport tourism "is a growing market and many different cities and countries want to be involved,”

=== Celebrity and nostalgia sport tourism ===
Celebrity and nostalgia sport tourism involves visits to the sports halls of fame and venue and meeting sports personalities in a vacation basis.

=== Active sport tourism ===
Active sport tourism refers to those who participate in the sports or sport events. Rugby football, football, basketball, etc are considered active sports and many sport events (which we call tournaments or festivals) are organized each year in most of the countries in the world. Youth sports tourism and college sports tourism, as defined above, are examples of this.

== See also ==
- Spectator sport
- List of adjectival tourisms
