= Devotional articles =

Religious souvenirs

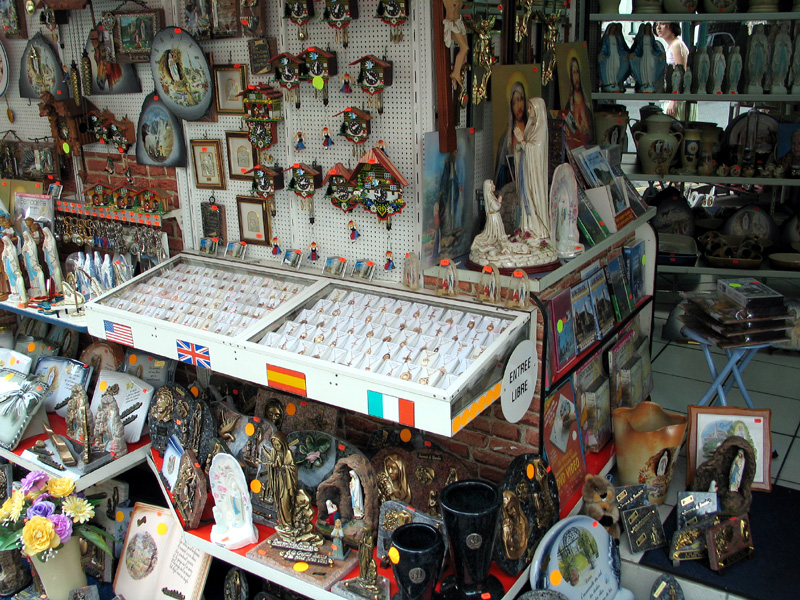
Religious merchandise in Lourdes, France

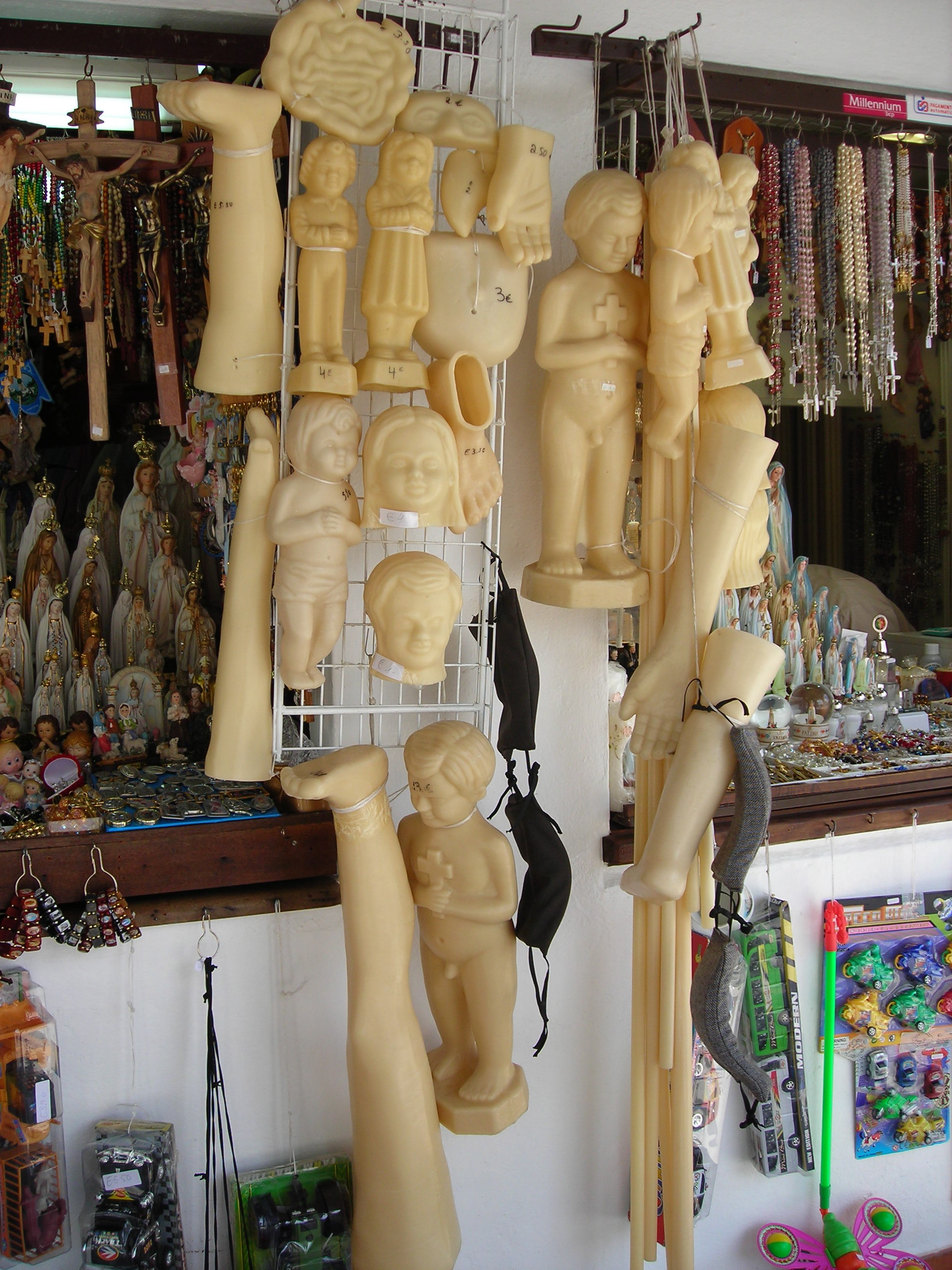
Religious merchandise near the Sanctuary of Fátima, Portugal

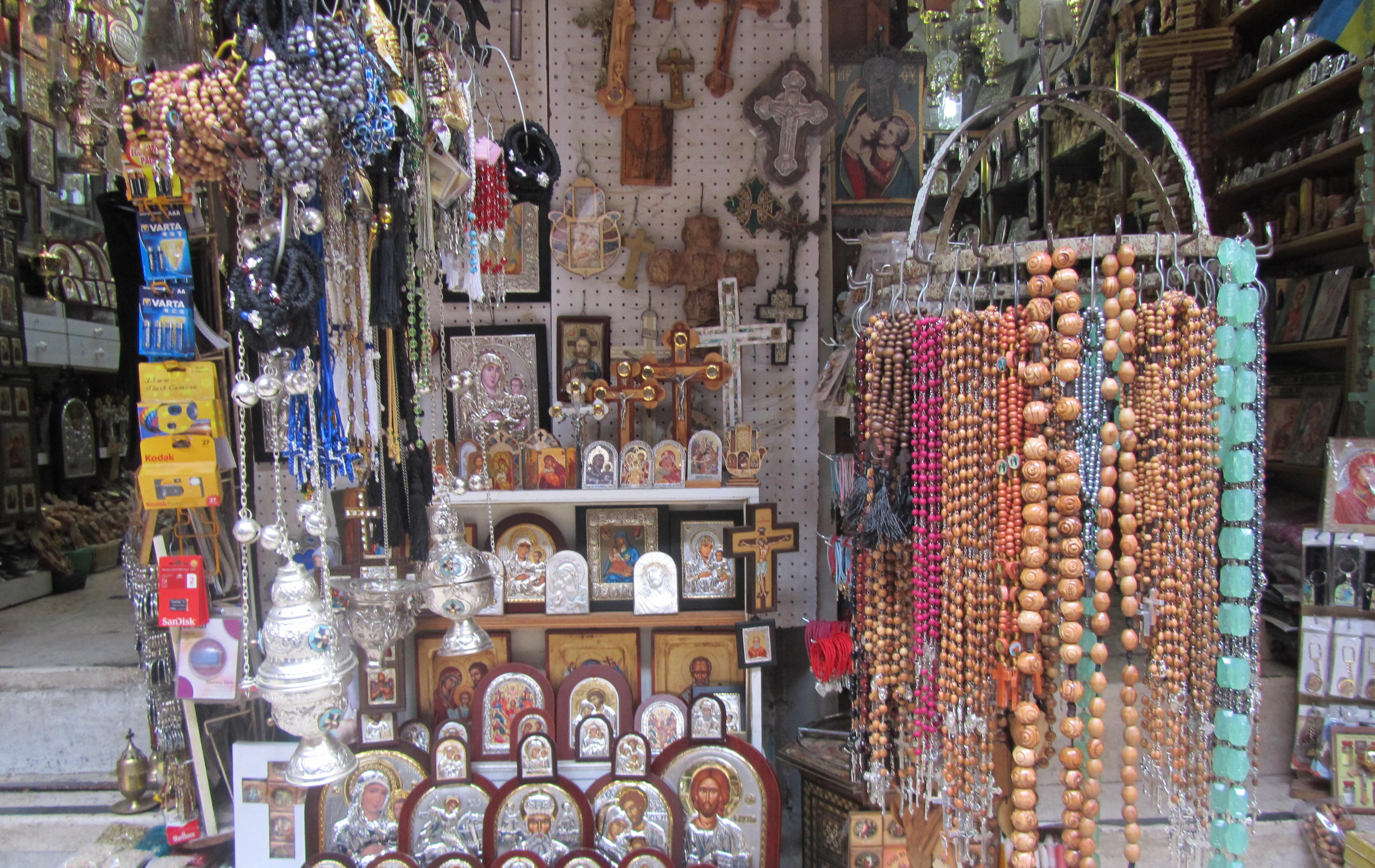
Religious merchandise in Jerusalem, Israel

Devotional objects (also, devotional articles, devotional souvenirs, devotional artifacts) are religious souvenirs (figurines, pictures, votive candles, books, amulets, and others), owned and carried by the religious, who see them as imbued with spiritual values, and use them for votive offering. Production and sales of devotional articles have become a widespread industry in the vicinity of various religious sites all over the world.

Devotional articles have a long history; in Christianity they have been mentioned in historical works such as those related to Paul the Apostle and in older religions they have been traced as far back as the times of ancient Egypt and ancient Mesopotamia. International law defines "devotional articles" as including "the Bible, the Koran, prayer and service books, hymnals, ritual articles, sacramental wine, crucifixes and rosaries". Such items may be natural and hardly processed (such as earth from the Holy Land), but the majority of modern devotional articles are mass-produced (strips of paper with prayers, pictures of holy figures, prayer books, etc.) Such items are usually seen as having little artistic value, as their primary function is not decorative but spiritual. In Hinduism, devotional articles include the japamala (prayer beads), diyas (oil lamps), kalashas (metal pots), incense sticks, plants such as tulasi, and conches.

American sociologist Charles H. Lippy observed that such articles are "means of access to the supernatural", and are criticized by some as superstition. Devotional articles owned by famous religious figures, such as Catholic Saints, commonly become religious relics. Widespread popularity of certain devotional articles has, throughout centuries, influenced the public popular image of certain religious symbols, such as angels.

== See also ==
- Amulet
- Cetiya
- Holy card
- Monza ampullae
- Pilgrim badge
- Prayer beads
- Prayer wheels
- Religious art
- Religious goods store
- Religious tourism
- Talisman
- Thangka
