= Global Muslim Travel Index =

The Global Muslim Travel Index (GMTI) is a travel index that ranks countries based on their performance in the Muslim travel market. The index is published by CrescentRating in collaboration with MasterCard.

== History ==
The Global Muslim Travel Index was started by Fazal Bahardeen in 2011 and is published annually by CrescentRating.

In 2017, GMTI covering 130 countries was published with Malaysia as the highest-ranked country in Muslim travel.

In the 2018 report, GMTI estimated that there were around 140 million Muslim travelers worldwide.

In 2019 GMTI rankings, Indonesia and Malaysia were ranked as the most Muslim travel-friendly countries.

In 2021, the ranking was expanded to 140 destinations. The index ranked Malaysia as the top-ranked in the halal travel industry and noted changes in preferences of travelers such as the rise of contactless travel.

In 2022, GMTI rankings were published again with Malaysia as the top-ranked country.

In June 2023, GMTI 2023 rankings were published with Indonesia and Malaysia tied for first place. In third position was Saudi Arabia, followed by the United Arab Emirates in fourth place. Türkiye was in 5th place.

== Methodology ==
The overall index is calculated based on a number of factors including the air connectivity, airport facilities, communication, the number of visitors, halal food options, travel environment, visa, and ease to access a place of worship.

In 2021 GMTI, the index also took into consideration factors such as travel corridors and bubbles.
