= Bein Hazmanim =

Vacation time in Jewish yeshivas

Bein hazmanim (Hebrew: בֵּין הַזְּמַנִּים, lit. 'between the times') is the vacation time in Jewish yeshivas. Bein hazmanim generally correspond to the major Jewish holidays, and are periods during which official studies are suspended and students typically leave the yeshiva setting. Bein hazmanim blocks divide between the three major yeshiva zmanim (semesters)—the Elul zman, choref (winter) zman, and kayitz (summer) zman. The summer zman is sometimes referred to as the "Pesach zman"—particularly in yeshivas that end their semesters prior to, or at the very beginning of, the summer rather than on Tisha B'Av.

The yeshiva year typically begins on 1 Elul—this being Rosh Chodesh Elul. The first zman runs for five and a half weeks; until the end of Yom Kippur on 10 Tishrei. The month of Elul, the beginning of Tishrei, and the High Holy Days, all marked by focus on repentance, are followed by the extended, more joyous holiday of Sukkot at the end of Tishrei. The first major bein hazmanim period usually begins immediately following Yom Kippur, and runs at least until the end of Sukkot (22 Tishrei in Israel, and 23 Tishrei in the diaspora). Some yeshivas extend bein hazmanim until the end of Tishrei.

Choref zman begins after Sukkot and is the longest zman of the yeshiva year. It spans the month of Cheshvan through the end of Adar, with only a few holidays in the middle (Hanukkah, Tu BiShvat, and Purim). This zman traditionally ends early in the month of Nissan—either on Rosh Chodesh Nissan or a few days later. Bein hazmanim beginning at this juncture in the year span most of Nissan, which includes the holiday of Pesach in its entirety (15-21 Nissan, and 22 Nissan in the diaspora).

After Passover, yeshiva starts up again by the beginning of Iyar. Kayitz zman runs for just over three months, and concludes with The Three Weeks. These three weeks of mourning culminate with Tisha B'Av and the end of kayitz zman. Between Tisha B’Av and 1 Elul are roughly three weeks, which make up the final bein hazmanim in the yeshiva year.

== Bein Hazmanim through the ages ==
While the institution of Bein Hazmanim is recent relative to the long history of Jewish study, there are a few precedents in the Jewish canon for this concept.

=== Early precursors ===
In the Mishnah and Talmud there are records of Friday and Sabbath being days off for Yeshiva students. Perhaps the earliest source of an extended Yeshiva vacation is Rava, who allowed his students at the Pumbedita Academy to take off the months of Nissan and Tishrei for the purposes of farming (although it is assumed that most students did not actually leave). During the Amoraic and Middle Ages, Yeshiva learning was largely confined to the Yeshiva itself. Jews lived in precarious situations, and during holidays the Yeshiva setting itself provided the most secure environment. There was a notion amongst the Tosafists of having two distinct Zmanim, one beginning on Rosh Chodesh Cheshvan and one beginning on Rosh Chodesh Iyar. But aside from this, Bein Hazmanim is altogether not mentioned in pre-Acharon Jewish texts.

=== Development ===
By the 16th century there is explicit mention of Bein Hazmanim. The Maharal (Judah Loew ben Bezalel) criticizes his students in one of his writings for wasting too much time during Bein Hazmanim. Contemporaries of the Maharal also felt that Bein Hazmanim was not conducive to expanding the thinking mind. Some rabbis during this era gave off small pockets of days, but never very much. There were rabbis who had to travel far away for medical attention, and they would give off Yeshiva days to accommodate this need.

As the value for recreation time spread during the modern era, Yeshivas followed suit and slowly began to tolerate such an idea. Lithuanian Yeshivas were known to begin the Zman with a ceremonial opening, in which all of the Yeshiva's rabbis would gather to hear a Shiur Petichah (opening lecture) about the tractate to be studied that Zman. The endpoints for the Bein Hazmanim periods varied in the 16th and 17th centuries between Italy, Poland, and Germany.

By the 17th century, Yeshivas in Lithuania and Eastern Europe more or less practiced the contemporary model of Bein Hazmanim. As it became popular to spend Bein Hazmanim meeting women at fairs and having a good time with wanderlust and adventuring, the idea of Bein Hazmanim was permanently established.

=== Today ===
While it is similar in many ways to other Yeshivas, Yeshiva University’s undergraduate Torah studies program is unique, compared to the typical Yeshiva, with regard to Bein Hazmanim. In addition to vacation days on and around the major Jewish holidays (Passover and Sukkot) and in the summer, additional vacation time is given at Yeshiva University in between the first and second college semesters, as well as at the end of the academic year, which ends in May. Students at Yeshiva University often refer to these breaks, which coincide with college semester breaks, as “Bein Hasemesterim” (lit. in between the semesters). Although there are no mandatory undergraduate Torah studies during these times, students are encouraged to partake in special Torah studies programs, such as “Yeshivas Bein Hasemesterim” and “June Zman.”

In recent years there have been instances when Yeshivas cancelled Bein Hazmanim. During these occasions, students were encouraged to continue their daily schedule of intensive study despite the official onset of Bein Hazmanim. One such instance was in the summer of 2014 as Israeli soldiers invaded the Gaza Strip in Operation Protective Edge. Leading rabbis (especially in Haredi Yeshivas) felt that extra Torah study and prayer would fortify the soldiers’ chances of a safe return from war.

== Attitudes toward Bein Hazmanim ==
Attitudes toward Bein Hazmanim vary between different Yeshivas and socio-religious circles. In many Hesder and Modern Orthodox American-program Yeshivas in Israel, Bein Hazmanim is seen as an opportunity to travel the Land of Israel. Often, students from these Yeshivas spend significant time hiking in regions such as the Galilee or the Negev. It is popular to do the “Yam L’Yam” (lit. sea to sea) hike, from the Sea of Galilee to the Mediterranean Sea. Some students prefer less active forms of tourism, such as visiting museums or the beach. Many American Modern Orthodox Yeshiva students return from Israel to the Diaspora to visit family, particularly for the Passover-time Bein Hazmanim. While the Kayitz Zman technically lasts until Tisha B’Av, many American Modern Orthodox Yeshiva students in Israel tend to leave Yeshiva a month and a half early to attend summer camp or learning programs in America or Israel.

For Hareidi Yeshiva students in Israel and the Diaspora, Bein Hazmanim is also seen as an opportunity to travel and spend time with family at home. Dating is another popular activity for Hareidi Yeshiva students during Bein Hazmanim. Given the increased amount of free time, students often take time to meet prospective marriage candidates.

Students from different religious affiliations sometimes spend their Bein Hazmanim pursuing their religious studies in a different setting, whether it be in Bein Hazmanim Yeshivas, in Kollels, or in learning camps. Many Hasidic Yeshivas simply relocate to more rural areas (such as Upstate New York); there, the fresh air provides a change of scenery, all the while allowing for an intensive learning schedule. There are other students who utilize the vacation time as an opportunity to earn some money, as the demanding Yeshiva schedule typically does not accommodate for other wage-earning occupations. During the Passover-time Bein Hazmanim, many students run small businesses cleaning automobiles and houses to help prepare for the holiday. During the Sukkot-time Bein Hazmanim, many offer themselves as Sukkah-builders, either for charge or as Chesed.

Generally, students look forward to and enjoy Bein Hazmanim, as they see it as an opportunity to take a break from their intensive studying. Many rabbis feel strongly that Bein Hazmanim offers opportunities to grow spiritually in a different context; for example, spending time with parents or friends, working in a different setting, or traveling the Land of Israel. Others (students and rabbis alike) view Bein Hazmanim as an opportunity to study texts that are not typically studied during the typical Yeshiva setting, such as "non-Yeshivish" tractates of the Talmud or obscure s’farim not in the average student's prevue.

Despite the view amongst rabbis that the break from learning is a positive ordeal, many warn their students before Bein Hazmanim of the dangers of involving themselves in inappropriate behavior and futile activities that could damage their spiritual persona. Lectures are delivered before every Bein Hazmanim to this effect in many Yeshivas, warning students to remain committed to prayer and studies at some level despite the lack of a Yeshiva framework. Other Rabbis have approached the idea of Bein Hazmanim more broadly, such as Rabbi David Stav in his (Hebrew) book "Bein Hazmanim – Culture and Recreation in Jewish Law and Thought" (Hebrew: בֵּין הַזְּמַנִּים – תַּרְבּוּת בִּלּוּי וּפְנַאי בַּהֲלָכָה וּבַמַּחְשָׁבָה). He uses general terms and specific examples to address the concepts of leisure time, entertainment, and recreation from the prospective of Halakha and Hashkafa. Although he is considered to be more liberal than most Orthodox rabbis, partially due to some lenient conclusions found in this book, this work is nonetheless significant in that it directly addresses issues encountered by modern-day yeshiva students during their Bein Hazmanim (such as watching movies and going to the beach).

Still, to some contemporary rabbis, the idea of a break from intensive Torah study is foreign altogether. It has been said that Rabbi Joseph B. Soloveitchik, one of the preeminent Orthodox rabbis in twentieth century America, could not understand how students would not study religious texts during the summer months and the holiday periods with the same intensity as they would normally. To him, one is required to study Torah with the same intensity every day of the year, regardless of whether or not Yeshiva is in session.
