= Hasso Spode =

German historian and sociologist

- Born: 1951 (age 74–75); Friedrichshagen, Germany
- Occupations: historian and sociologist

Hasso Spode (born 1951 in Friedrichshagen) is a German historian and sociologist. The main focus of his research is historical anthropology and cultural history, and he also works in the field of social and political history.

== Biography ==
After his childhood in East Germany, Spode fled to West Berlin where he studied philosophy, history, theology, and sociology. He is a professor in Hanover and director of the Historical Archive on Tourism at Technische Universität Berlin. The main focus of his research is historical anthropology and cultural history, but he also works in the field of social and political history. He has published some 300 scientific articles in 13 languages, mostly in German, and has written or edited more than a dozen books. He was or is co-editor of Annals of Tourism Research, Voyage. Studies on Travel & Tourism, Zeitschrift für Tourismuswissenschaft and other journals. He was a member of the executive council of the Chinese Center of Drug Policy Studies and of the Alcohol and Drugs History Society and he was vice-president of the Tourism Committee of the International Sociological Association.

In the 1980s Spode analysed the Nazi leisure organization Strength Through Joy as a means of social politics in the Third Reich. In 1989 he launched the "study-group for tourism history", the first institution of its kind; in 1991 he published the worldwide first omnibus book in this field of research. In this connection, he stresses the romantic character of the tourist consumption and classifies tourist travel as "time travel aback" and, drawing on Reinhart Koselleck and Michel Foucault, the touristic space as a chronotope. He has also worked on the history and structures of alcohol use and misuse, including the phenomenon of addiction, which he sees as a physical-biological process and at the same time as a social construction that reflects the need for self-control in modern societies, an analytic dualism comparable to the wave-particle duality of light. His book on the Power of Drunkenness is held at least in 190 libraries. Spode has also worked on labour disputes, tobacco consumption and other historical and political topics. His works have been published in 13 languages.

== Selected works ==
- Alkohol und Zivilisation (Alcohol and Civilisation), Berlin: Tara 1991.
- Zur Sonne, zur Freiheit! Beiträge zur Tourismusgeschichte (Contributions to Tourism History), Berlin: Unikom 1991 (editor).
- Statistik der Arbeitskämpfe in Deutschland (Statistics of Labour Disputes in Germany), St. Katharinen: Scripta Mercaturae 1992 (together with H. Volkmann et al.).
- Die Macht der Trunkenheit (The Power of Drunkenness), Opladen: Leske & Budrich (Springer) 1993.
- Kreuzberg, Berlin: Nocolai 1994 (co-author).
- Goldstrand und Teutonengrill. Kultur- und Sozialgeschichte des Tourismus in Deutschland. 1945 bis 1989 (Social and Cultural History of Tourism in Germany), Berlin: Unikom 1996 (editor).
- Voyage. Studies on Travel and Tourism, Köln/Berlin: DuMont/Metropol 1997-2014 (yearbook editor)
- Wie die Deutschen Reiseweltmeister wurden (How the Germans became Travel World Champions), Erfurt: Landeszentrale für politische Bildung 2003.
- Die Zukunftsfähigkeit Deutschlands (Germany's Sustainability), Berlin: Wissenschaftszentrum Berlin 2006.
- Ressource Zukunft. Die sieben Entscheidungsfelder der deutschen Reform (Future as a Resource), Farmington Hills: Budrich 2008.
- Urlaub - Macht - Geschichte. Reisen und Tourismus in der DDR (Travel and Tourism in the GDR), Berlin: BeBra 2022.
- TraumZeitReise. Eine Geschichte des Tourismus (Dream time travel: a history of tourism), Berlin: BeBra 2025.
