= Historical Archive on Tourism =

Tourism in Germany

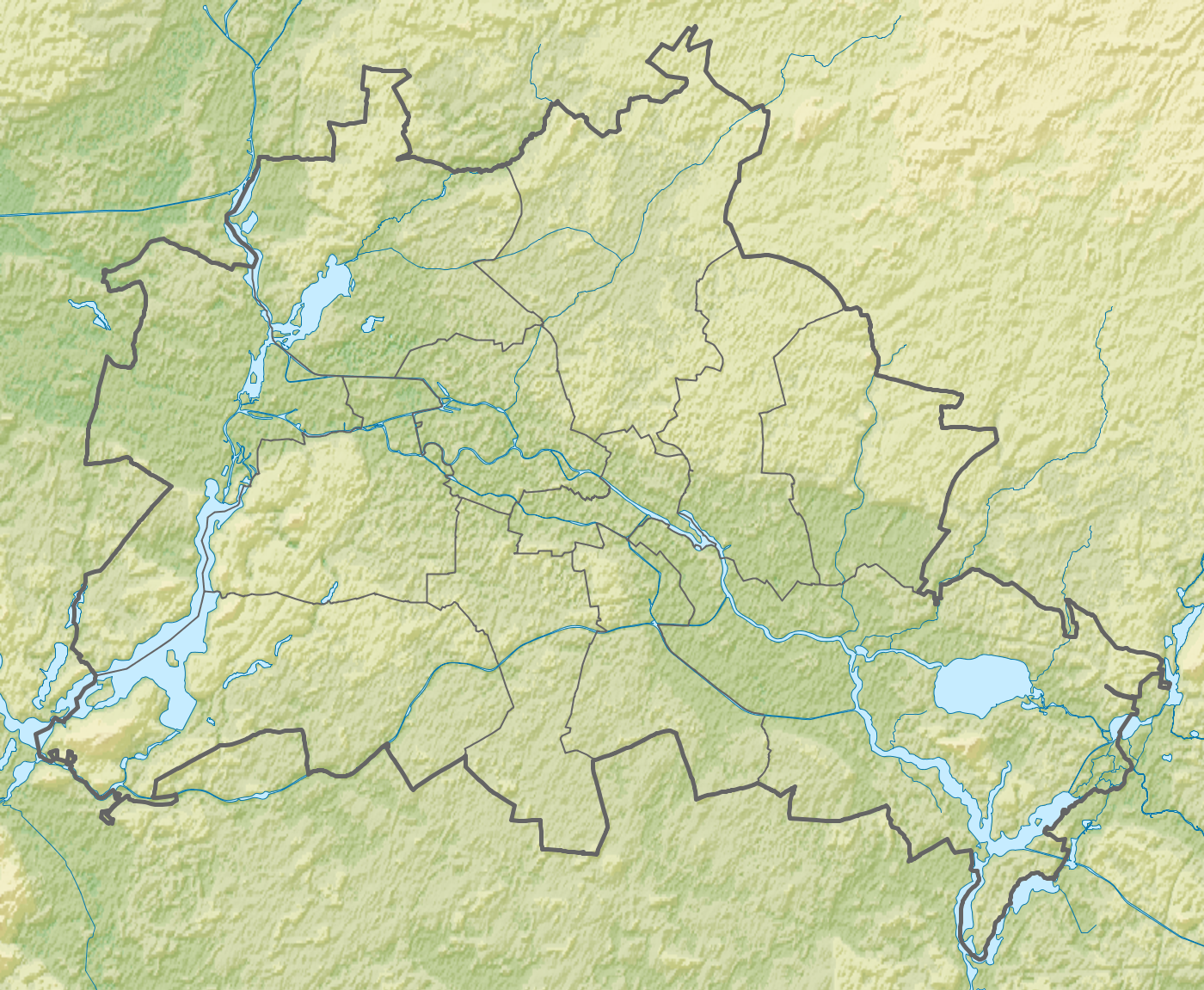
- Location within Berlin Location within Germany
- Established: 1986; 40 years ago
- Location: Berlin, Germany
- Coordinates: 52°30′28″N 13°19′44″E

The Historical Archive on Tourism (HAT, German: Historisches Archiv zum Tourismus) is sited in the city of Berlin at the Technische Universität Berlin where it is housed at the Center for Metropolitan Studies (CMS) and the Zentrum Technik und Gesellschaft (ZTG). The HAT had been founded in 1986/87 at the Freie Universität Berlin; in 2011 international protests helped to avert a planned shut-down of the archive and the following year it moved from the Free to the Technical University. Since 1999 the HAT is headed by the historian Hasso Spode and was co-financed by the Willy-Scharnow-Foundation.

Step-by-step the collection was enlarged with material about historical travel and tourism research. Today the length of the shelves amounts to some 800 running meters. The focus of the material is not so much on "travel" generally but on "tourism" as a special sort of travelling. The HAT is gathering various materials ranging from Baedekers to private photo albums. In particular, there is an extensive collection of flyers and other so-called ephemera. Mainly, the material stems from Central Europe, but specifically from Germany. However, other parts of the world are also represented, e.g. Southern Africa or USA.

Over 50,000 leaflets are stored, and more than 250 journals and some 13,000 books are registered. In addition statistics, posters and maps are gathered. The bulk of the material is from the 19th and 20th century, some books date back to around 1600. No OPAC is installed but lists of titles are published in the Internet.
