= Religious tourism =

Travel to religious sites, whether spiritual or sightseeing

Hajj in Mecca, Saudi Arabia, is one of the largest gatherings for religious purposes anywhere in the world.

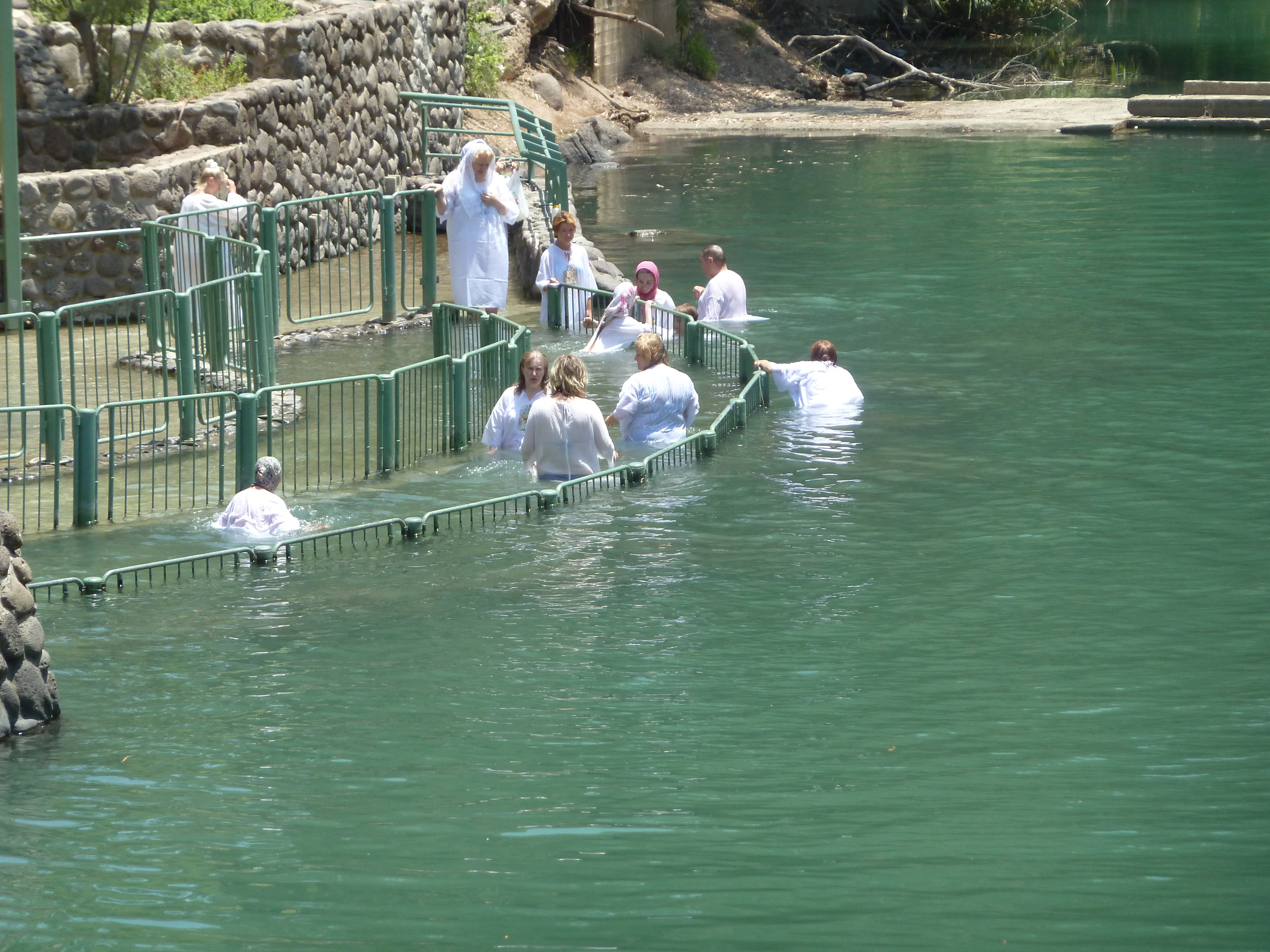
Christians come to the Jordan river to baptise. Picture taken in Yardenit, Israel.

Religious tourism, spiritual tourism, sacred tourism, or faith tourism, is a type of tourism with two main subtypes: pilgrimage, meaning travel for religious or spiritual purposes, and the viewing of religious monuments and artefacts, a branch of sightseeing.

== Types ==
Religious tourism has been characterised in different ways by researchers. Gisbert Rinschede distinguishes these by duration, by group size, and by social structure. Juli Gevorgian proposes two categories that differ in their motivation, namely "pilgrimage tourism" for spiritual reasons or to participate in religious rites, and "church tourism" to view monuments such as cathedrals. The Christian priest Frank Fahey writes that a pilgrim is "always in danger of becoming a tourist", and vice versa since travel always in his view upsets the fixed order of life at home, and identifies eight differences between the two:

Distinguishing pilgrimage from tourism, according to Frank Fahey
Element	Pilgrimage	Tourism
Faith	always contains "faith expectancy"	not required
Penance	search for wholeness	not required
Community	often solitary, but should be open to all	often with friends and family, or a chosen interest group
Sacred space	silence to create an internal sacred space	not present
Ritual	externalizes the change within	not present
Votive offering	leaving behind a part of oneself, letting go, in search of a better life	not present; the travel is the good life
Celebration	"victory over self", celebrating to remember	drinking to forget
Perseverance	commitment; "pilgrimage is never over"	holidays soon end

== Pilgrimage ==
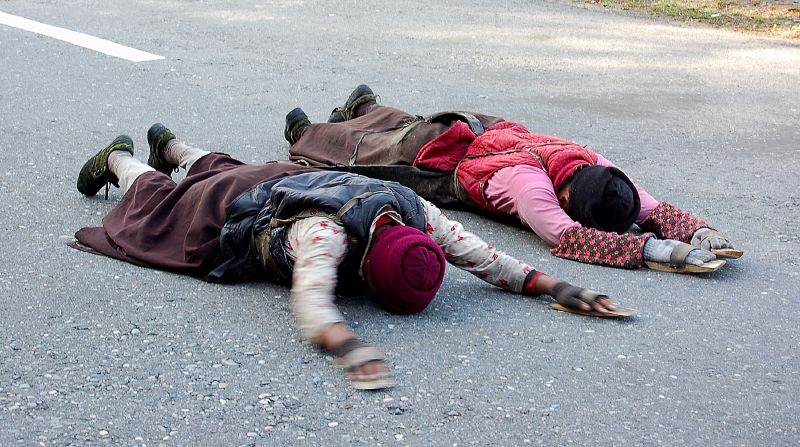
Tibetans on a pilgrimage to Lhasa, doing full-body prostrations, often for the entire length of the journey.

Pilgrimage is spiritually- or religiously motivated travel, sometimes over long distances; it has been practised since antiquity and in several of the world's religions. The world's largest mass religious assemblage takes place in India at the Kumbh Mela, which attracts over 120 million pilgrims. Other major pilgrimages include the annual Hajj to Mecca, required once in a Muslim's life. These journeys often involve elaborate rituals and rites, reflecting the deep significance and varied traditions associated with pilgrimage in different cultures and faiths.

== Religious sightseeing ==
Religious sightseeing can be motivated by various interests, including religion, art, architecture, history, and personal ancestry. People can find holy places interesting and moving, whether they personally are religious or not. Some, such as the churches of Italy, offer fine architecture and major artworks. Portugal, for example, has as its main religious tourism attraction the Sanctuary of Our Lady of Fátima, internationally known by the phenomenon of Marian apparitions. The city of Aparecida, in Brazil, is also an international destination for religious tourism.

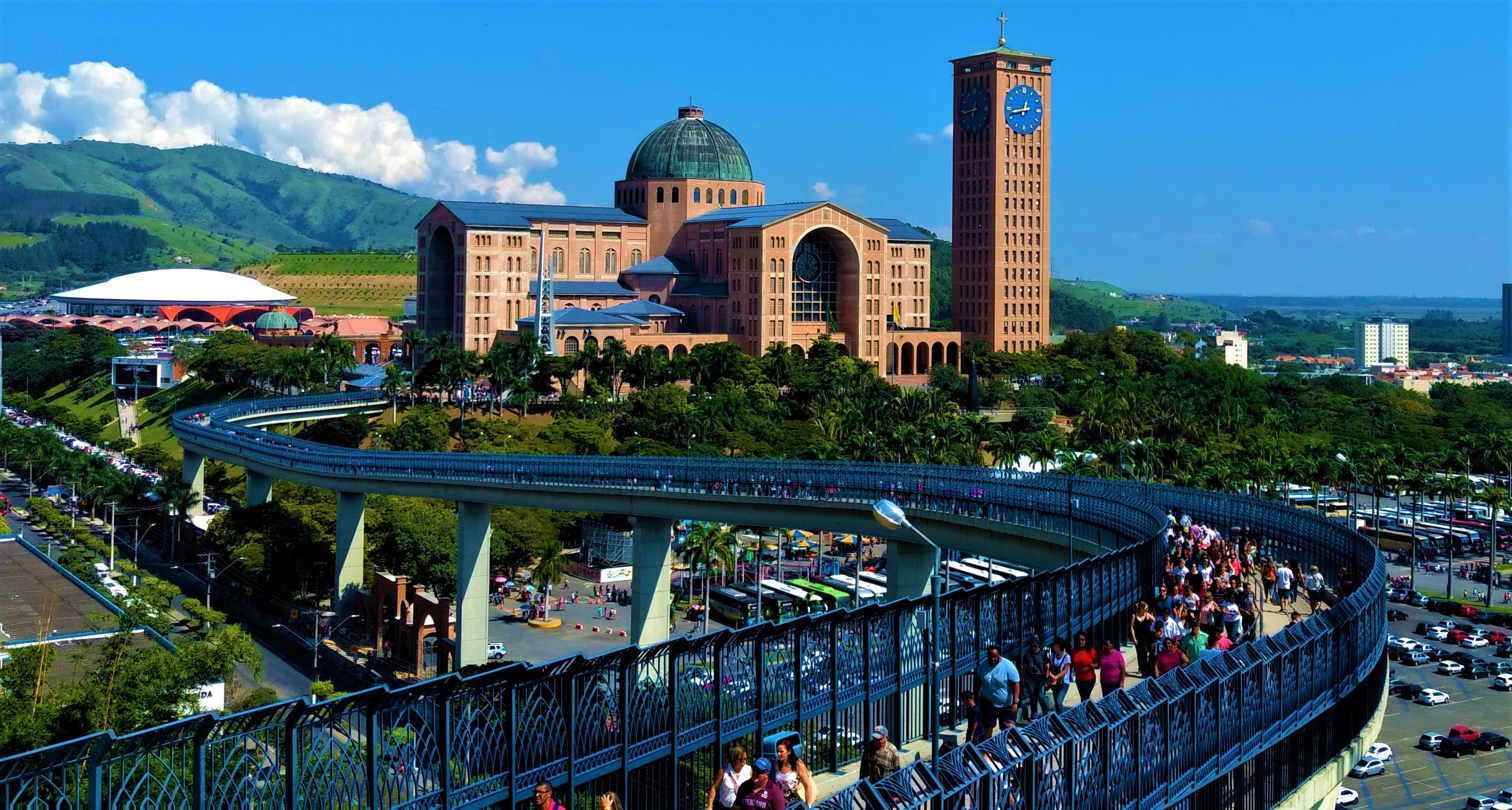
Thousands of tourists on the Passarela da Fé of the Basilica of Our Lady of Aparecida, in São Paulo, Brazil. It is the largest cathedral and the second largest Catholic church in the world.

Others are important to world religions: Jerusalem holds a central place in Judaism, Christianity, and Islam. Others again may be both scenic and important to one religion, like the Way of Saint James in Spain, but have been adopted by non-religious people as a personal challenge and indeed as a journey of self-discovery. Religious tourism in India can take many forms, including yoga tourism; the country has sites important to Hinduism, Buddhism, Sikhism and Islam as well as magnificent architecture and, for some travellers, the attraction of orientalism. Japan too offers beautiful religious places from Buddhist temples to Shinto shrines.

== Secular pilgrimage ==
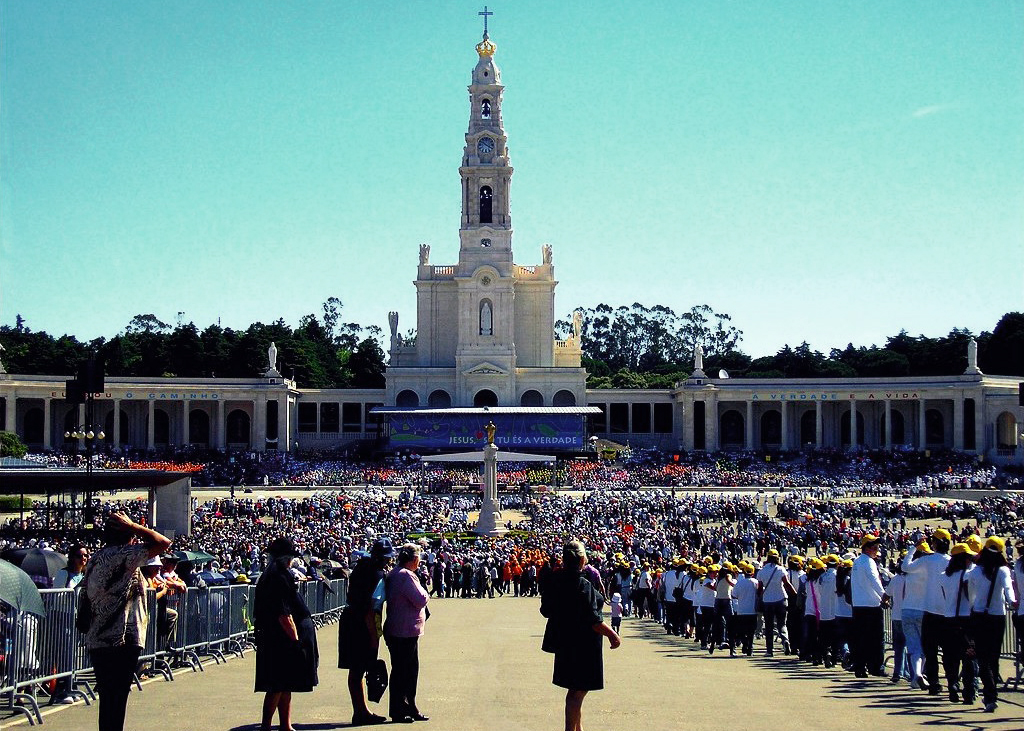
Tourists and pilgrims in front of the Sanctuary of Fátima in Portugal.

A category intermediate between pilgrims belonging to a major world religion and pure tourism is the modern concept of secular pilgrimage to places such as the Himalayas felt to be in some way special or even sacred, and where the travel is neither purely pious, nor purely for pleasure, but is to some degree "compromised". For example, New Age believers may travel to such "spiritual hotspots" with the intention of healing themselves and the world. They may practise rituals involving leaving their bodies, possession by spirits (channelling), and recovery of past life memories. The travel is considered by many scholars as transcendental, a life learning process or even a self-realization metaphor.

== See also ==
- Christian tourism
- Devotional articles
- Halal tourism
- Kosher tourism
- Char Dham Yatra
