= Xingyun (group) =

Chinese e-commerce company

- Industry: E-commerce
- Headquarters: Shenzhen, China
- Areas served: Internationally
- Products: Commodities

Shenzhen Tianxingyun Supply Chain Co., Ltd., better known as Xingyun (Chinese: 行云集团), is a Chinese e-commerce company which provides services for commodities internationally. It is based in Shenzhen, China. In 2021, Xingyun became a unicorn company after the funding round.

It helps expand international companies in China.

== History ==
Xingyun has received funding in multiple rounds such as $200 million in Series C funding in September 2020 and $600 million in series C2 funding in April 2021.

In August 2021, it expanded its operations to Kenya.

In February 2025, Xingyun Group launched the print-on-demand service, Flexcreate.
