= Justice tourism =

Ethic for travelling

Justice tourism or solidarity tourism is an ethic for travelling that holds as its central goals the creation of economic opportunities for the local community, positive cultural exchange between guest and host through one-on-one interaction, the protection of the environment, and political/historical education. It also seeks to develop new approaches to and forms of globalization, and may overlap with revolutionary tourism.

It has been promoted particularly in Bosnia and Palestine, especially by the Alternative Tourism Group and the Christian initiative in Palestine.

Denis Tolkach proposed that justice tourism aligned with the precepts of anarchist philosophy, particularly that of anarchism without adjectives, due to its focus on solidarity and connection with the anti-capitalist and anti-globalization movements.

== See also ==
- Global justice movement
- Flight shame
- Socially responsible investing
- Volunteer tourism
