= Christian tourism =

Religious tourism geared towards Christians

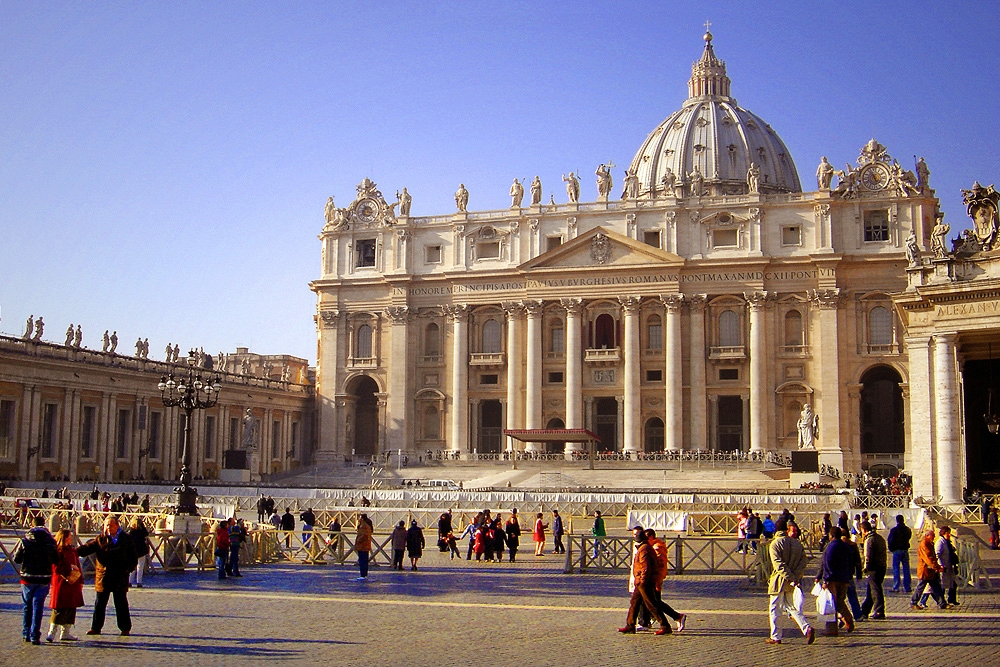
St. Peter's Basilica in Vatican City is a major Christian tourist site

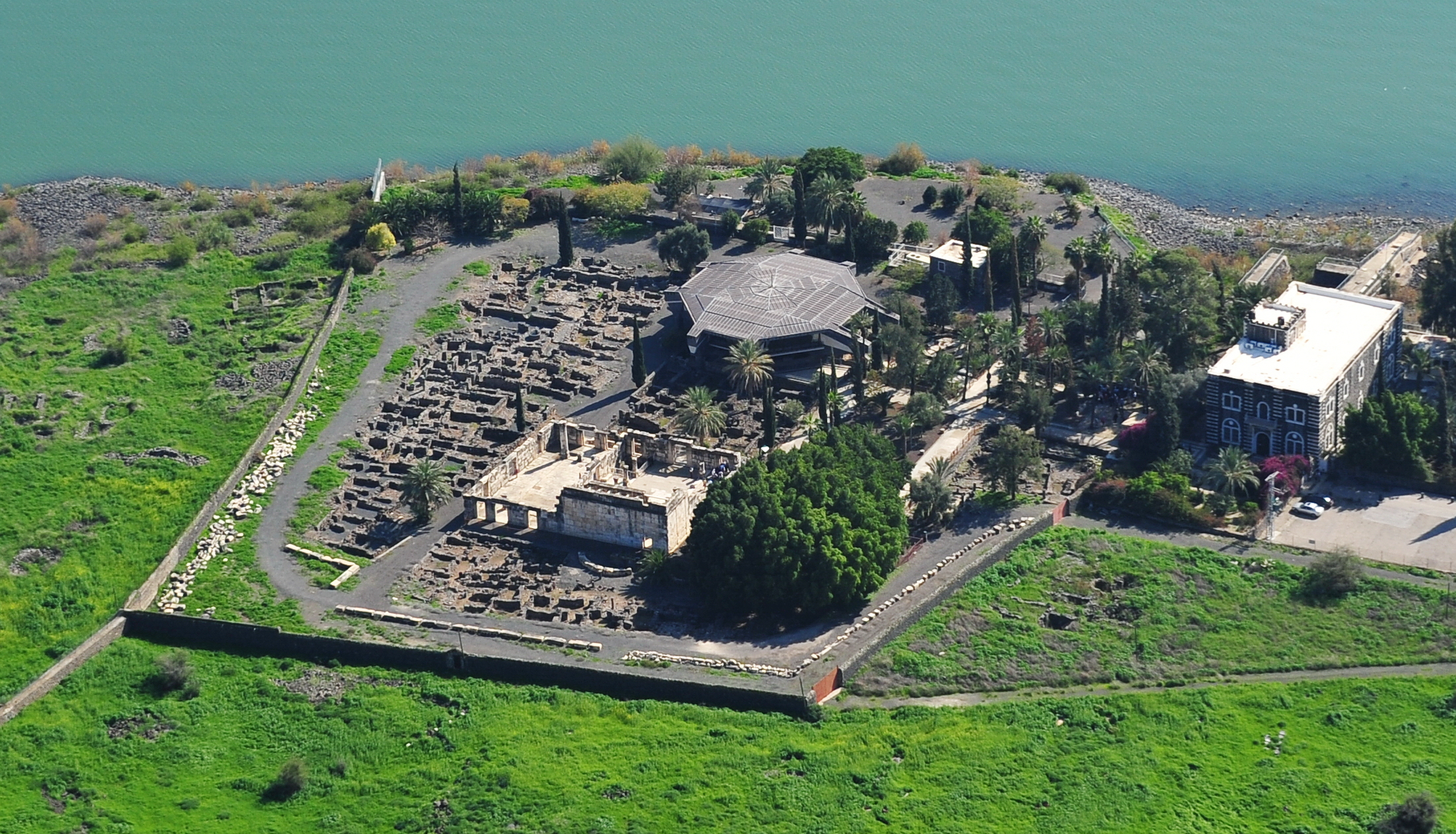
Capernaum, an ancient Judean village associated with Jesus and a major site for Christian tourism in the Holy Land

Christian tourism is a subcategory of religious tourism which is geared towards Christians. As one of the largest branches of religious tourism, it is estimated that seven percent of the world's Christians—about 168 million people—are "on the move as pilgrims" each year.

== Definition ==
Christian tourism refers to the entire industry of Christian travel, tourism, and hospitality. In recent years it has grown to include not only Christians embarking individually or in groups on pilgrimages and missionary travel, but also on religion-based cruises, leisure (fellowship) vacations, crusades, rallies, retreats, monastery visits/guest-stays and Christian camps, as well as visiting Christian tourist attractions.

== Christian pilgrimage ==
Each year millions of Christians travel on pilgrimage. The most popular pilgrim destination is the Abrahamic Holy Land, or Jerusalem. Nazareth and Capernaum, associated with the life of Jesus are also in Israel. Most Christian pilgrimage destinations are based on the Roman Catholic faith, especially shrines devoted to apparitions of the Blessed Virgin Mary such as: Basilica of Our Lady of Guadalupe in Mexico, Sanctuary of Our Lady of Fatima in Portugal, and Sanctuary of Our Lady of Lourdes in France. There is also interest in pilgrimage to St. Peter's Basilica at the Vatican in Rome, the capital of the Roman Catholic Church.

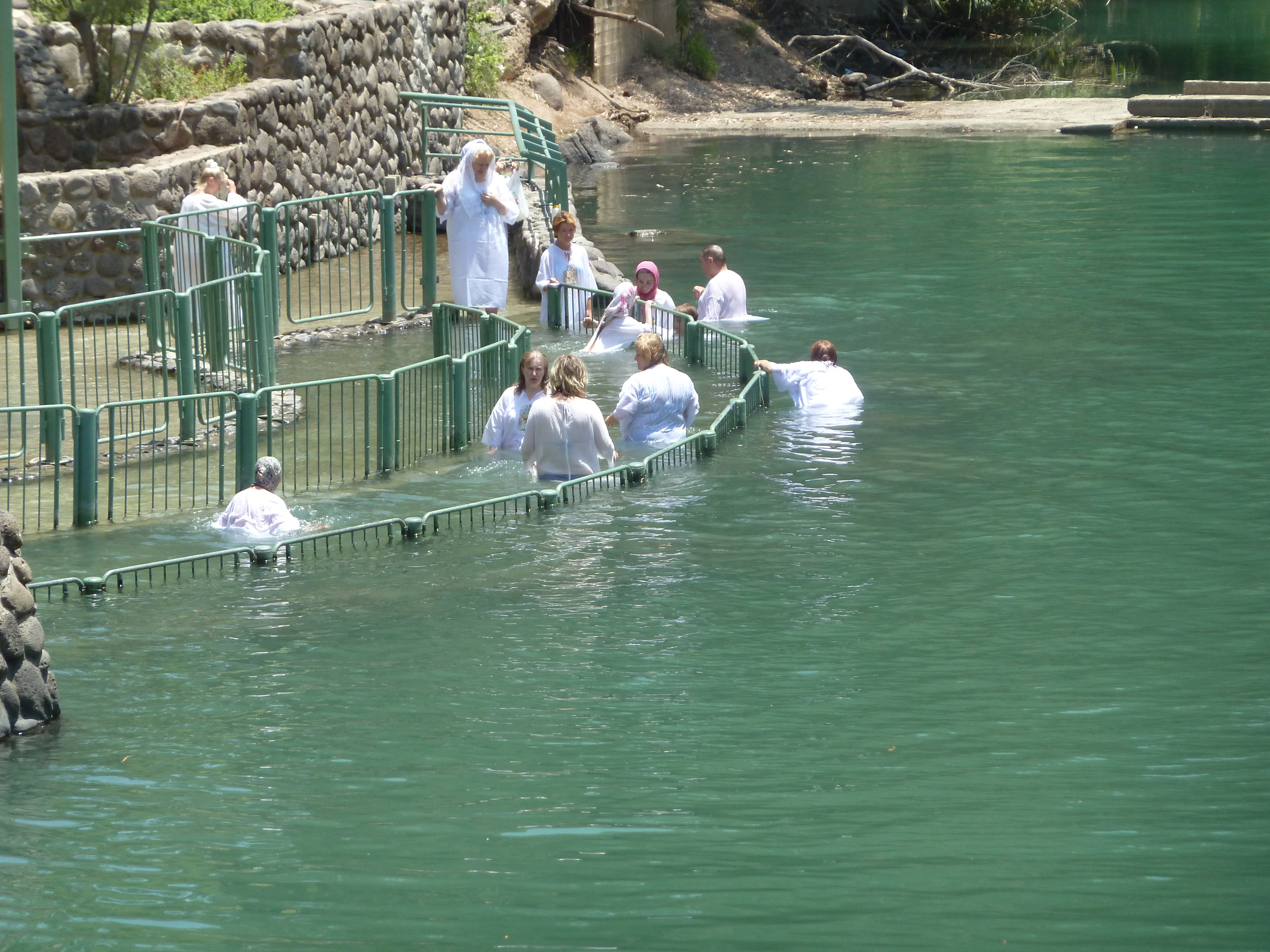
Christians come to the Jordan river to baptise. Picture taken in Yardenit, Israel.

== Statistics ==
Although no definitive study has been completed on Christian tourism, some segments of the industry have been measured:

- According to the Religious Conference Management Association, in 2006 more than 14.7 million people attended religious meetings (RCMA members), an increase of more than 10 million from 1994 with 4.4 million attendees.
- The United Methodist Church experienced an increase of 455% in Volunteers in Mission between 1992 with almost 20,000 volunteers and 2006 with 110,000 volunteers.
- The Christian Camp and Conference Association states that more than eight million people are involved in CCCA member camps and conferences, including more than 120,000 churches.
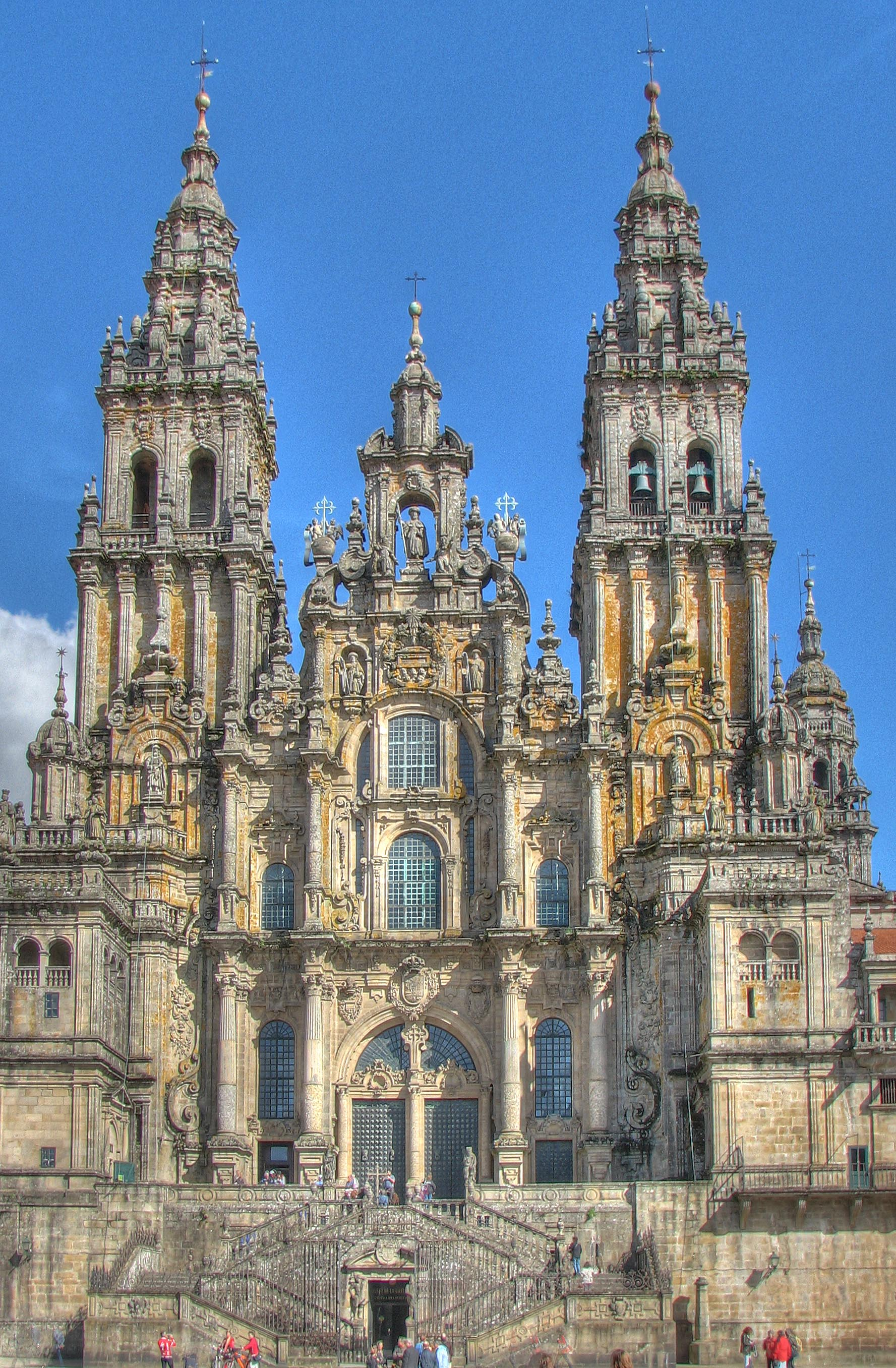
  Santiago de Compostela, a major site for Christian tourism in Spain
  Short-term missions draw 1.6 million participants annually.
- Christian attractions including Sight & Sound Theatre attracts 800,000 visitors a year while the Holy Land Experience and Focus on the Family welcome center each receives about 250,000 guests annually. The Creation Museum and Billy Graham Library receive about 250,000 visitors each year as well. Ark Encounter receives nearly 1,000,000 a year.
- 50,000 churches in the United States possess a travel program or travel ministry.

== Articles ==
- The Early Show: "Rest, relaxation, & religion"
- Time: "Spirit and adventure"
- USA Today: "On a wing and a prayer"
- The New York Times: "21st-century religious travel, Leave the sackcloth at home"
- Los Angeles Times: "More agencies are serving the flock - religious travelers"
- Beliefnet: "Companies see increased interest in spiritual tours"
- Rocky Mountain News: "In the footsteps of the faithful"
- Yahoo! News: "Keeping the Faith"
- The Washington Post: "Seeking answers with field trips in faith"
- The Nassau Guardian: "Religious niche being targeted by Bahamas Ministry"
