= Kosher tourism =

Tourism centered around the Jews

Kosher tourism is tourism which is geared mostly towards Orthodox Jews. The accommodations in these destinations include kosher foods, and are within walking distance of Orthodox synagogues. Flights to these destinations often have kosher airline meals available.

== Holiday travel ==
Many kosher vacation packages are geared toward the Jewish holidays throughout the year including Passover, Sukkot and Hanukkah. In Israel, schools are on vacation and parents take advantage of the free time to travel within the country or overseas. Yeshivas in other parts of the world also have a vacation period during these holidays known as Bein Hazmanim.

=== Passover ===
A seasonal subcategory of the Kosher tourism industry is travel for Passover, a period of a week that otherwise involves special preparation of the personal home and kitchen. It includes specially designed all-inclusive Passover cruises and resorts.

=== Sukkot ===
The week-long holiday of Sukkot involves the need to eat meals and sleep in a sukkah which destinations and locations wishing to attract observant Jews will build, either for eating only, or overnight use as well.

=== Hanukkah ===
During the holiday of Hanukkah, places such as Modi'in are popular for those who want to see the historical sites where many of the events leading up to the Maccabean Revolt took place.

== Haredi tourism ==
Another subcategory of the Kosher tourism industry is tourism products geared toward the Haredi community. This segment of the Kosher tourism industry has a potential customer base of about 800,000 households. Important aspects of this segment of the industry include separate hours for men and women at swimming pools and beaches and the hotels might remove televisions or Internet access from rooms and the lobby, and kosher vacation rental platforms such as the booking site Kvation and the classified site GoKosher have further expanded accommodation options for the Haredi travelers.

== See also ==
- Kashrut
