= Halal tourism =

Tourism catering for Muslim families

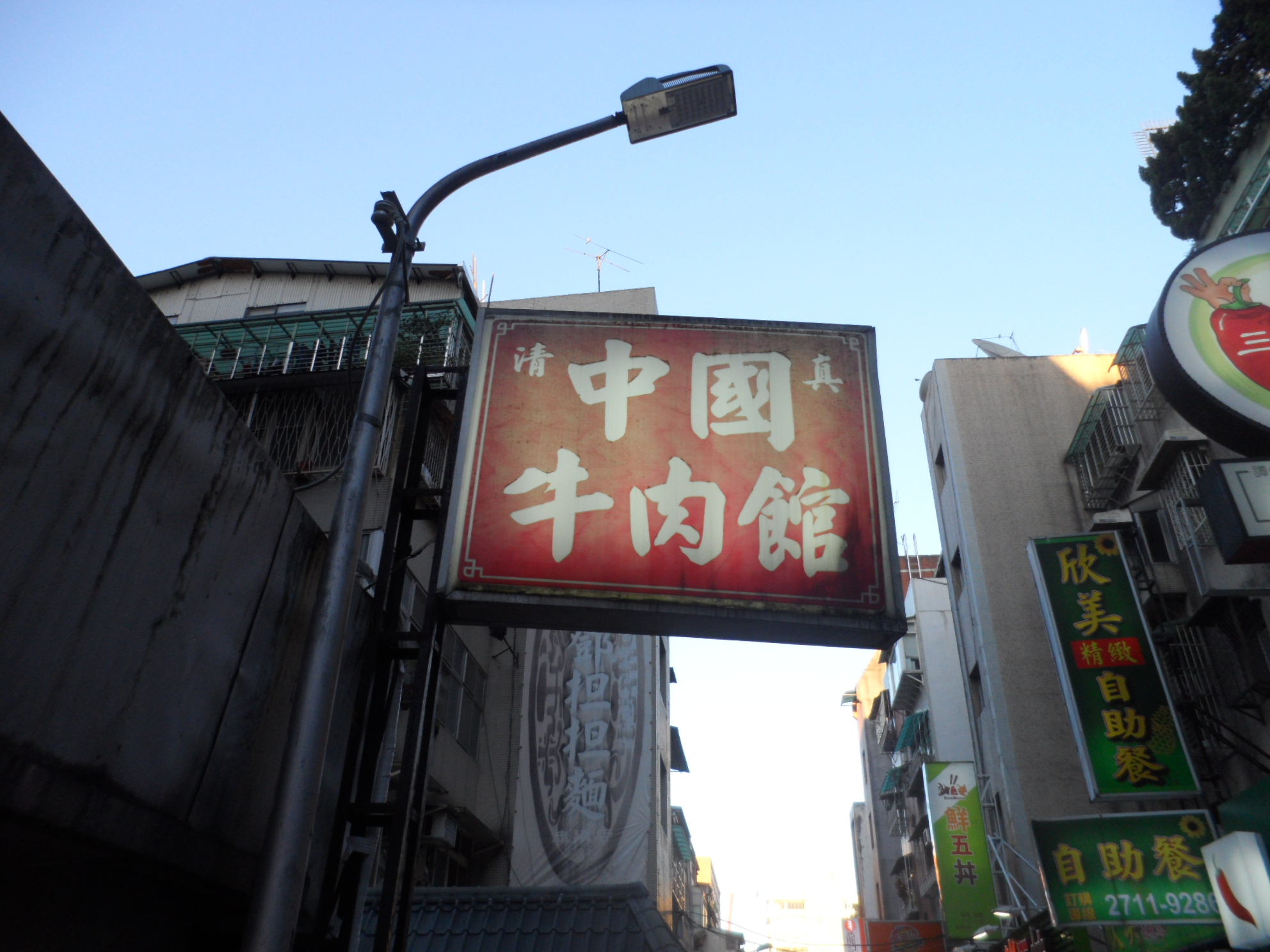
Halal Chinese restaurant in Taipei, Taiwan.

Halal tourism (sometimes called Halal travel or halal-friendly tourism) is a subcategory of tourism which is geared towards Muslim families who abide by the rules of Islam. The hotels in such destinations do not serve alcohol, have separate swimming pools and spa facilities for men and women, serve only halal food, and have prayer facilities in-room and in a common hall. Travel agents, while designing travel packages for this, follow guidelines of halal. Malaysia, Turkey and many more countries offer facilities in accordance with the religious beliefs of Muslim tourists in order to attract more customers. Currently, there exist no internationally recognized standards on Halal tourism.

The Halal tourism industry also provides flights where no alcohol or pork products are served, prayer timings are announced, and religious programs are broadcast as part of entertainment offered on board.

Many international hotels serve halal food that is slaughtered in accordance with the teachings of Islamic Sharia and is free of any substances forbidden by Islam such as pork and alcohol. Some hotels have employed people from the Muslim world to provide translation services and other assistance that may be needed by tourists from Muslim countries.

The Economist's article on Halal Business published on May 25, 2013: "It is not just manufactured halal products. Services such as halal holidays are booming, too. Crescent Tours, a London-based online travel specialist, books clients into hotels in Turkey that have separate swimming pools for men and women, no-alcohol policies and halal restaurants, and rents out private holiday villas with high walls", which was featured on Forbes offers Muslim-friendly hotels and advice about halal food options, Quran availability and more.

== Muslim travel standard ==
In 2008, CrescentRating was launched as the world's first online hotel reference tool dedicated to Muslim travellers. CrescentRating is divided into a rating scale of 1 through 7 and categories based on the range of amenities and services each participating property offers Muslim guests, including availability of prayer carpets, qibla direction, alcohol policies and availability of halal-certified food.

In 2015, a similar halal classification system called Salam Standard was launched by Tripfez. It has a 4-level classification system ranging from bronze to platinum. The classification system has been recognized and supported by the Ministry of Tourism, Arts and Culture (Malaysia) and the Islamic Tourism Centre (ITC) and presented at the COMCEC conference under the auspices of the Organisation of Islamic Cooperation (OIC) in 2017. The recognition by the ITC is the Muslim-Friendly Tourism and Hospitality Assurance and Recognition (MFAR) is awarded to industry players and businesses that qualify and to address the importance of Muslim tourists by providing them assurance and confidence.

== Halal travel around the world ==
Muslim travel contributed over US$156 billion to global GDP in 2016 and is primed to grow to US$225 billion by 2028, according to the Global Muslim Travel Index 2023 by CrescentRating. Based on a report by Thomson Reuters, in 2014 Muslims from around the globe spent $142 billion on travel (excluding Hajj and Umrah). In comparison, travellers from China spent $160 billion on travel in 2014, while US travellers spent $143 billion, placing the Muslim travel sector in third place in global travel spending and accounting for 11 per cent of total global expenditures on travel.

=== In the UK ===
In April 2017, UK ranked 20th in the overall Global Muslim Travel Index but 3rd in the non-OIC destinations beating Spain despite its past Islamic heritage. Part of the success was due to it Air Connectivity, ease of communication, family friendly destination and ease of prayers spaces which may stem from its domestic population of Muslims.

=== In Indonesia ===
In December 2024, the Bali Tourism Board reaffirmed its rejection of mandatory Halal tourism labeling and insisted on the island's commitment to culture-based tourism. While acknowledging the importance of inclusivity, officials stated that Bali would continue to offer Muslim-friendly services without compromising its Hindu cultural identity.
