= Sunday drive =

A Sunday drive is an automobile trip, primarily in the United States, Australia and New Zealand, although also recognised in the United Kingdom and elsewhere, typically taken for pleasure or leisure on a Sunday, usually in the afternoon. During the Sunday drive, there is typically no destination and no rush.

== Origin ==
The use of the automobile for the Sunday drive began in the 1920s and 1930s. The idea was that the automobile was not used for commuting or errands, but for pleasure. There would be no rush to reach any particular destination. The practice became increasingly popular throughout the 20th century.

== Views ==
Traveling on Sunday by automobile is questioned by some Christians, due to observing Sunday Sabbath. While these parties consider the activity "leisure", they do not count it as "rest".

Henry Ford was an advocate of the Sunday drive. He promoted the weekend for activity rather than rest because it led to the sale of automobiles.

== Effect of fuel prices ==
During the mid-2000s, as a result of higher gasoline prices, some have curtailed their Sunday drives. But after OPEC started increasing supply to hold market share against North American shale oil producers, oil and gasoline prices dropped to record levels leading some to go driving on Sunday again in the mid-2010s.

== See also ==
- Booze cruise
- Day trip
- Paratransit
- Picnic
- Staycation
