= Day trip =

Visit to a tourist attraction on the same day

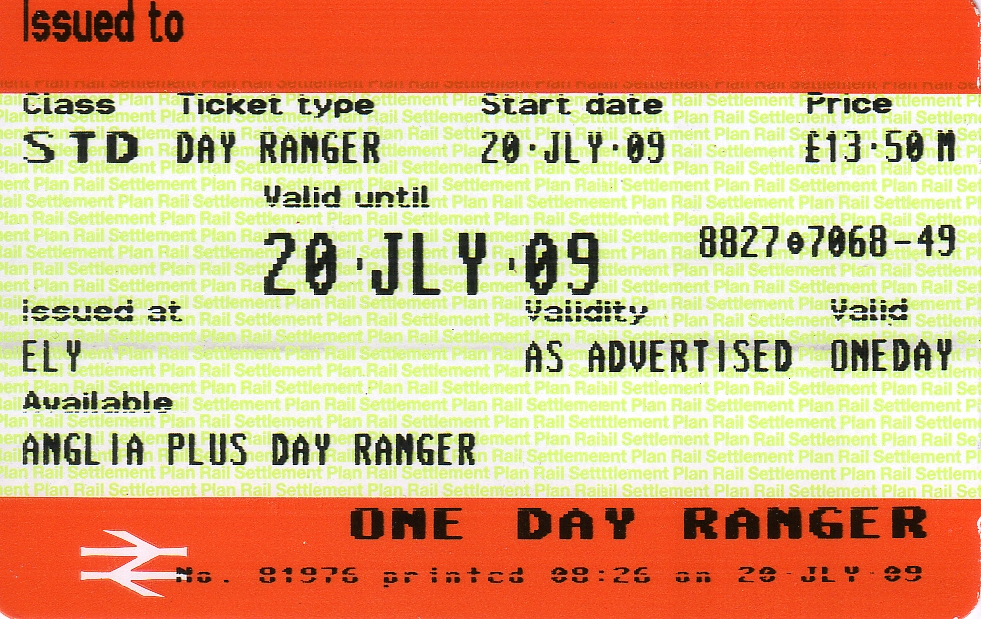
A day ranger travel card from eastern England

A day trip is a visit to a tourist destination or visitor attraction from a person's home, hotel, or hostel in the morning, returning to the same lodging in the evening. The day trip is a form of recreational travel and leisure to a location that is close enough to make a round-trip within a day and does not require an overnight stay. The logistics and/or costs of spending nights on the road are worth avoiding. Such travel of using one location as a homebase is popular with budget and active travelers to avoid finding new lodging at each destination. A caregiver may take a day trip from their home to return to their children or pets.

== History ==
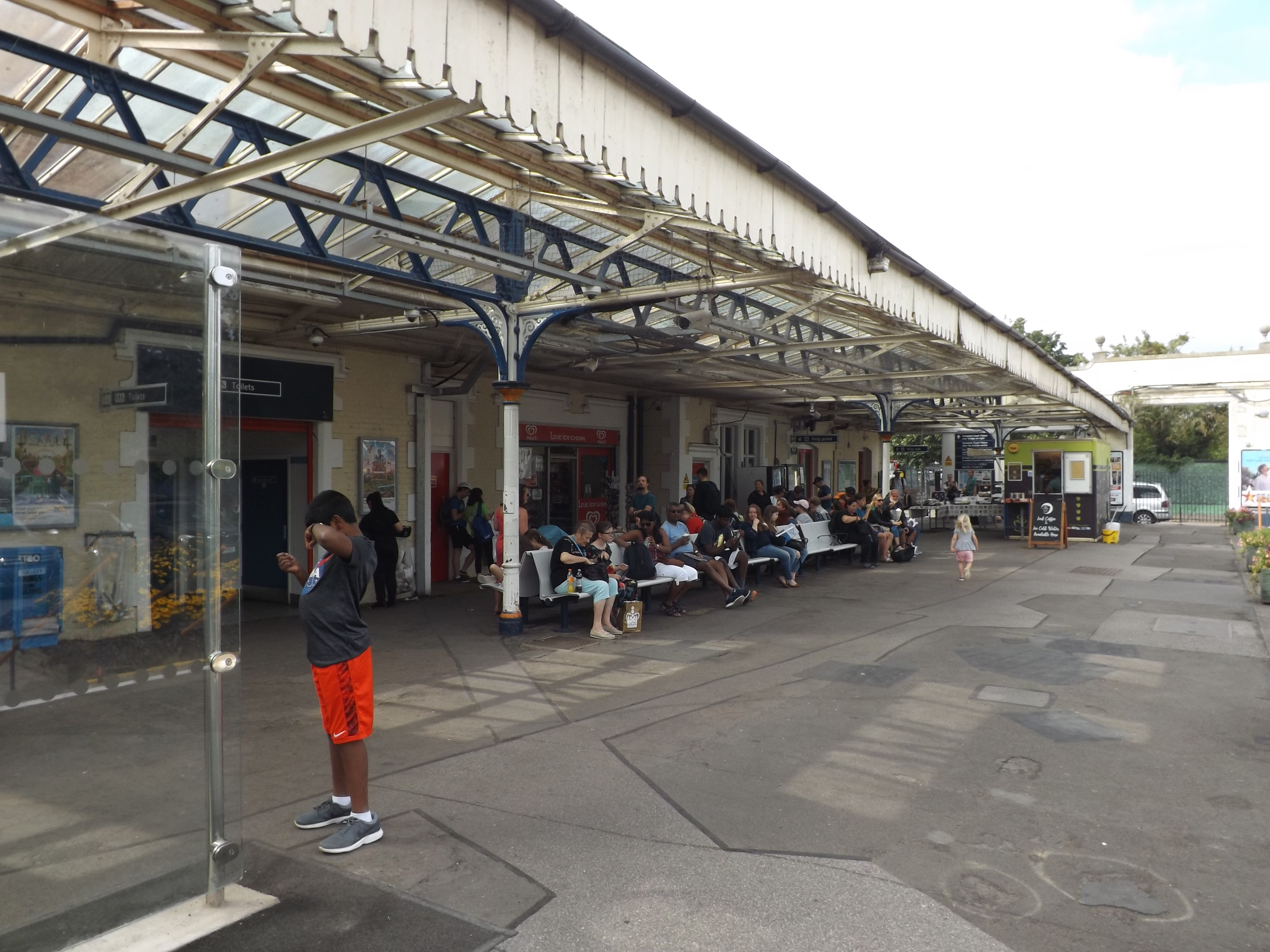
Day trippers, who have visited Hampton Court Palace nearby, wait for a train to arrive at Hampton Court railway station

In medieval times a destination for such a trip would be religious (to a nearby shrine) or commercial (for example, to a seasonal fair). Later, in England, visits to country houses by those who regarded themselves middle class became frequent, and it was the tradition to reward the butler or housekeeper with a tip (gratuity) for providing access to their employer's home. As such houses were meant for show, it is unlikely that the owning family would object, provided they were not in residence at the time.

The arrival of the railway excursion, often using Day Tripper tickets, in the mid 19th century saw the blossoming of a distinctive day-tripper industry. Trippers also travelled in their thousands by paddlesteamer or steamship to the many piers around Victorian era seaside resorts. The General Slocum excursion was an example.

Cycling became a very popular day-tripper activity, especially amongst urban and suburban workers, from the mid-1880s onwards.

Coach and charabanc outings followed as the internal combustion engine became reliable enough to get the paying customers out and back again. Works outings and church or chapel excursions were extremely popular until the 1970s.

While all of the foregoing still exist, the modern day-tripper experience is usually by motor car as a result of the growth of car ownership. Also, airlines such as (formerly) Palmair promote day trips.

== Statistics ==
In Germany in 2011, day trips were the predominant type of tourism. According to figures from the Hanover Chamber of Industry and Commerce, 2.84 billion day trippers spent an average of 28 euros in total (gross) that year, around 79.5 billion euros and 564 million Day business travelers €14.2 billion. Other surveys also assume an added value of between €20 and €30 per day tourist. The city of Berlin has, on average, calculated an added value of €32.50 per visitor in recent years with 132 million day visitors. The numbers are i. i.e. R. collected by a representative survey in the source area (survey at the place of residence). The reason for a day stay is often to visit local attractions or sights, to visit sports and leisure facilities, museums, cultural events such as musicals, opera/operettas, concerts and theater performances or just to shop in the city's shops.

== See also ==
- Booze cruise
- "Day Tripper", a song
- Paratransit
- Picnic
- Staycation
- Sunday drive
