= Victorian era =

Queen Victoria's reign, 1837 to 1901

- 1837–1901
Georgian era	Edwardian era
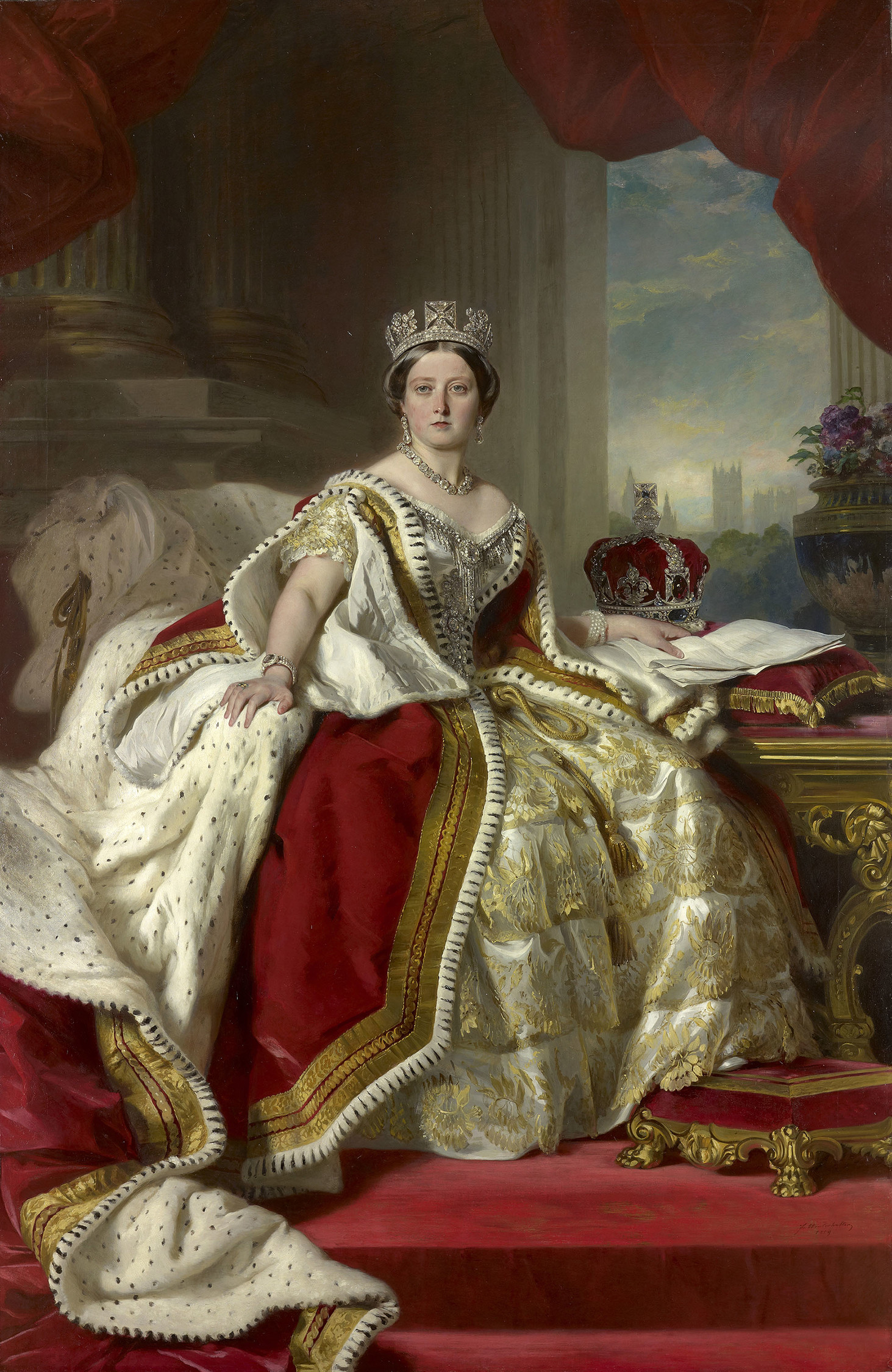
- Painting of Queen Victoria by Franz Xaver Winterhalter (1859)
- Monarch: Victoria
- Leaders: The Viscount Melbourne; Sir Robert Peel; Lord John Russell; The Earl of Derby; The Earl of Aberdeen; The Viscount Palmerston; Benjamin Disraeli; William Ewart Gladstone; The Marquess of Salisbury; The Earl of Rosebery

In the history of the United Kingdom and the British Empire, the Victorian era was the reign of Queen Victoria, from 20 June 1837 until her death on 22 January 1901, although slightly different definitions are sometimes used. The era followed the Georgian era and preceded the Edwardian era, and its later half overlaps with the first part of the Belle Époque era of continental Europe.

Various liberalising political reforms took place in the UK, including expanding the electoral franchise. The Great Famine caused mass death in Ireland in the mid-1840s. Britain had relatively peaceful relations with the other great powers. It participated in various military conflicts, mainly against minor powers. The British Empire expanded during this period and was the world's hegemonic superpower.

Victorian society valued a high standard of personal conduct across all sections of society. The emphasis on morality gave impetus to social reform but also placed restrictions on certain groups' liberty. Prosperity rose during the period, but debilitating undernutrition persisted. Literacy and childhood education became near-universal in Great Britain for the first time. While some attempts were made to improve living conditions, slum housing and disease remained a severe problem.

The period saw significant scientific and technological development. Britain was advanced in industry and engineering in particular, but somewhat less developed in art and education. Great Britain's population increased rapidly, while Ireland's fell sharply.

== Terminology and periodisation ==
In the strictest sense, the Victorian era covers the duration of Victoria's reign as Queen of the United Kingdom of Great Britain and Ireland, from her accession on 20 June 1837—after the death of her uncle, William IV—until her death on 22 January 1901, after which she was succeeded by her eldest son, Edward VII. Her reign lasted 63 years and seven months, longer than any of her predecessors. The term "Victorian" was in contemporaneous usage to describe the era. The era can also be understood in a more extensive sense—the "long Victorian era"—as a period that possessed sensibilities and characteristics distinct from the periods adjacent to it, (Note: This is the term used for the period covered by Patrick Leary's international academic mailing-list VICTORIA 19th-century British culture & society.) in which case it is sometimes dated to begin before Victoria's accession—typically from the passage of or agitation for (during the 1830s) the Reform Act 1832, which introduced a wide-ranging change to the electoral system of England and Wales. (Note: A Scottish Reform Act and Irish Reform Act were passed separately.) Definitions that purport a distinct sensibility or politics to the era have also created scepticism about the worth of the label "Victorian", though there have also been defences of it.

The interwar period between the Napoleonic Wars (1815) and the First World War (1914) is often broadly seen as an age of peace, progress, and political liberalism. However, the Queen's 64-year reign created an illusion of continuous uniformity, masking significant shifts in ideas, manners, and values. Michael Sadleir was insistent that "in truth, the Victorian period is three periods, and not one". He distinguished early Victorianism—the socially and politically unsettled period from 1837 to 1850—and late Victorianism (from 1880 onwards), with its new waves of aestheticism and imperialism, from the Victorian heyday: mid-Victorianism, 1851 to the 1870s. He saw the middle period as characterised by a distinctive mixture of prosperity, domestic prudery, and complacency—what G. M. Trevelyan called the "mid-Victorian decades of quiet politics and roaring prosperity".

== Politics and foreign affairs ==
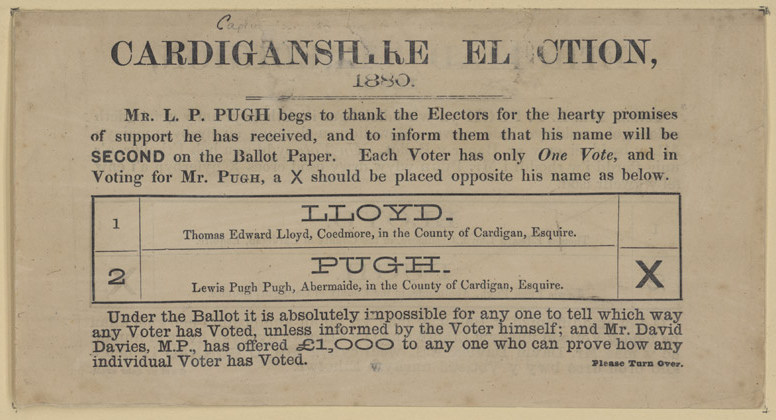
Information circulated by the campaign of Lewis Pugh Pugh, a candidate at the 1880 general election in Cardiganshire (now known as Ceredigion), explaining to supporters how to vote

The Reform Act, (Note: A Scottish Reform Act and Irish Reform Act were passed separately.) which made various changes to the electoral system, including expanding the franchise, was passed in 1832. The franchise was expanded again by the Second Reform Act (Note: See Representation of the People (Ireland) Act 1868 and Representation of the People (Scotland) Act 1868 for equivalent reforms made in those jurisdictions) in 1867. The Third Reform Act in 1884 introduced a general principle of one vote per household. All these acts, along with others, simplified the electoral system and reduced corruption. Historian Bruce L. Kinzer describes these reforms as putting the United Kingdom on the path towards becoming a democracy. The traditional aristocratic ruling class attempted to maintain as much influence as possible while gradually allowing the middle- and working-classes a role in politics. However, all women and a large minority of men remained outside the system into the early 20th century.

Cities were given greater political autonomy, and the labour movement was legalised. From 1845 to 1852, the Potato Famine caused mass starvation, disease and death in Ireland, sparking large-scale emigration. Across the British Empire, reform included rapid expansion of the British territory, the complete abolition of slavery in the African possessions and the end of transportation of convicts to Australia. Restrictions on colonial trade were loosened, and a responsible (i.e., semi-autonomous) government was introduced in some territories.

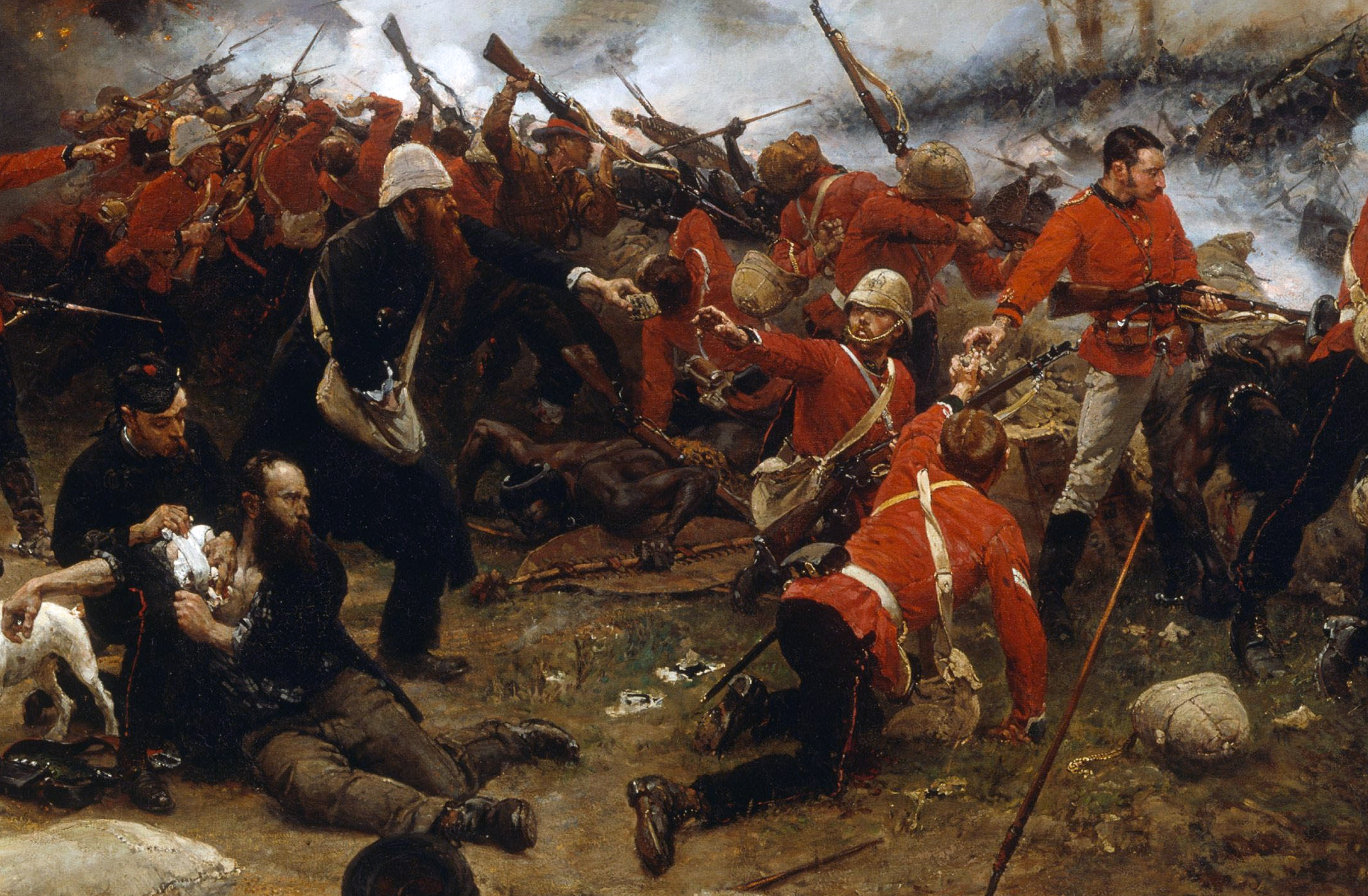
Depiction of the defence of Rorke's Drift during the Anglo-Zulu War of 1879 by Alphonse de Neuville (1880)

Throughout most of the 19th century, Britain was the most powerful country in the world. The period from 1815 to 1914, known as the Pax Britannica, was a time of relatively peaceful relations between the world's great powers. This is particularly true of Britain's interactions with the others. The only war in which the British Empire fought against another major power was the Crimean War, from 1853 to 1856. There were various revolts and violent conflicts within the British Empire, and Britain participated in wars against minor powers. It also took part in the diplomatic struggles of the Great Game and the Scramble for Africa.

In 1840, Queen Victoria married her German cousin Prince Albert of Saxe-Coburg and Gotha. The couple had nine children, who themselves married into various royal families, and the queen thus became known as the 'grandmother of Europe'. In 1861, Albert died. Victoria went into mourning and withdrew from public life for ten years. In 1871, with republican sentiments growing in Britain, she began to return to public life. In her later years, her popularity soared as she became a symbol of the British Empire. Queen Victoria died on 22 January 1901.

== Society and culture ==
=== Family life ===
The Victorian era saw a rapidly growing middle class who became an important cultural influence, to a significant extent replacing the aristocracy as British society's dominant class. A distinctive middle-class lifestyle developed that influenced what society valued as a whole. Increased importance was placed on the value of the family, and the idea that marriage should be based on romantic love gained popularity. A clear separation was established between the home and the workplace, which had often not been the case before. The home was seen as a private environment, where housewives provided their husbands with a respite from the troubles of the outside world. Within this ideal, women were expected to focus on domestic matters and to rely on men as income earners. Women had limited legal rights in most areas of life, and a feminist movement developed. Parental authority was seen as important, but children were given legal protections against abuse and neglect for the first time towards the end of the period. Access to education increased rapidly during the 19th century. State-funded schools were established in England and Wales for the first time. Education became compulsory for pre-teenaged children in England, Scotland and Wales. Literacy rates increased rapidly and had become nearly universal by the end of the century. Private education for wealthier children, boys and more gradually girls, became more formalised over the course of the century.

=== Religion and social issues ===
The growing middle class and the strong evangelical movement placed great emphasis on a respectable, moral code of behaviour. This included features such as charity, personal responsibility, controlled habits, (Note: Avoiding addictions such as alcoholism and excessive gambling) child discipline and self-criticism. As well as personal improvement, importance was given to social reform. Utilitarianism was another philosophy that saw itself as based on science rather than on morality, but also emphasised social progress. An alliance formed between these two ideological strands. The reformers emphasised causes such as improving the conditions of women and children, giving police reform priority over harsh punishment to prevent crime, religious equality, and political reform in order to establish a democracy. The political legacy of the reform movement was to link the nonconformists (part of the evangelical movement) in England and Wales with the Liberal Party. This continued until the First World War. The Presbyterians played a similar role as a religious voice for reform in Scotland.

Religion was politically controversial during this era, with Nonconformists pushing for the disestablishment of the Church of England. Nonconformists comprised about half of church attendees in England in 1851, (Note: They were a clear majority in Wales. Scotland and Ireland had separate religious cultures.) and gradually the legal discrimination that had been established against them outside of Scotland was removed. Legal restrictions on Roman Catholics were also largely removed. The number of Catholics grew in Great Britain due to conversions and immigration from Ireland. Secularism and doubts about the accuracy of the Old Testament grew among people with higher levels of education. Northern English and Scottish academics tended to be more religiously conservative, whilst agnosticism and even atheism (though its promotion was illegal) gained appeal among academics in the south. Historians refer to a 'Victorian Crisis of Faith', a period when religious views had to readjust to accommodate new scientific knowledge and criticism of the Bible.

=== Popular culture ===
A variety of reading materials grew in popularity during the period, including novels, women's magazines, children's literature, and newspapers. Much literature, including chapbooks, was distributed on the street. Music was also very popular, with genres such as folk music, broadsides, music halls, brass bands, theater music and choral music having mass appeal. What is now called classical music was somewhat undeveloped compared to parts of Europe, but did have significant support. Many sports were introduced or popularised during the Victorian era, which became important to male identity. Examples included cricket, football, rugby, tennis and cycling. The idea of women participating in sport did not fit well with the Victorian view of femininity, but their involvement did increase as the period progressed.

For the middle classes, many leisure activities such as tables games could be done in the home while domestic holidays to rural locations such as the Lake District and Scottish Highlands were increasingly practical. The working classes had their own culture separate from that of their richer counterparts, various cheaper forms of entertainment and recreational activities provided by philanthropy. Trips to resorts such as Blackpool were increasingly popular towards the end of the period. Photography became an increasingly accessible and popular part of everyday life. Initially the Industrial Revolution increased working hours, but over the course of the 19th century a variety of political and economic changes caused them to fall back down to (and in some cases below) pre-industrial levels, creating more time for leisure.

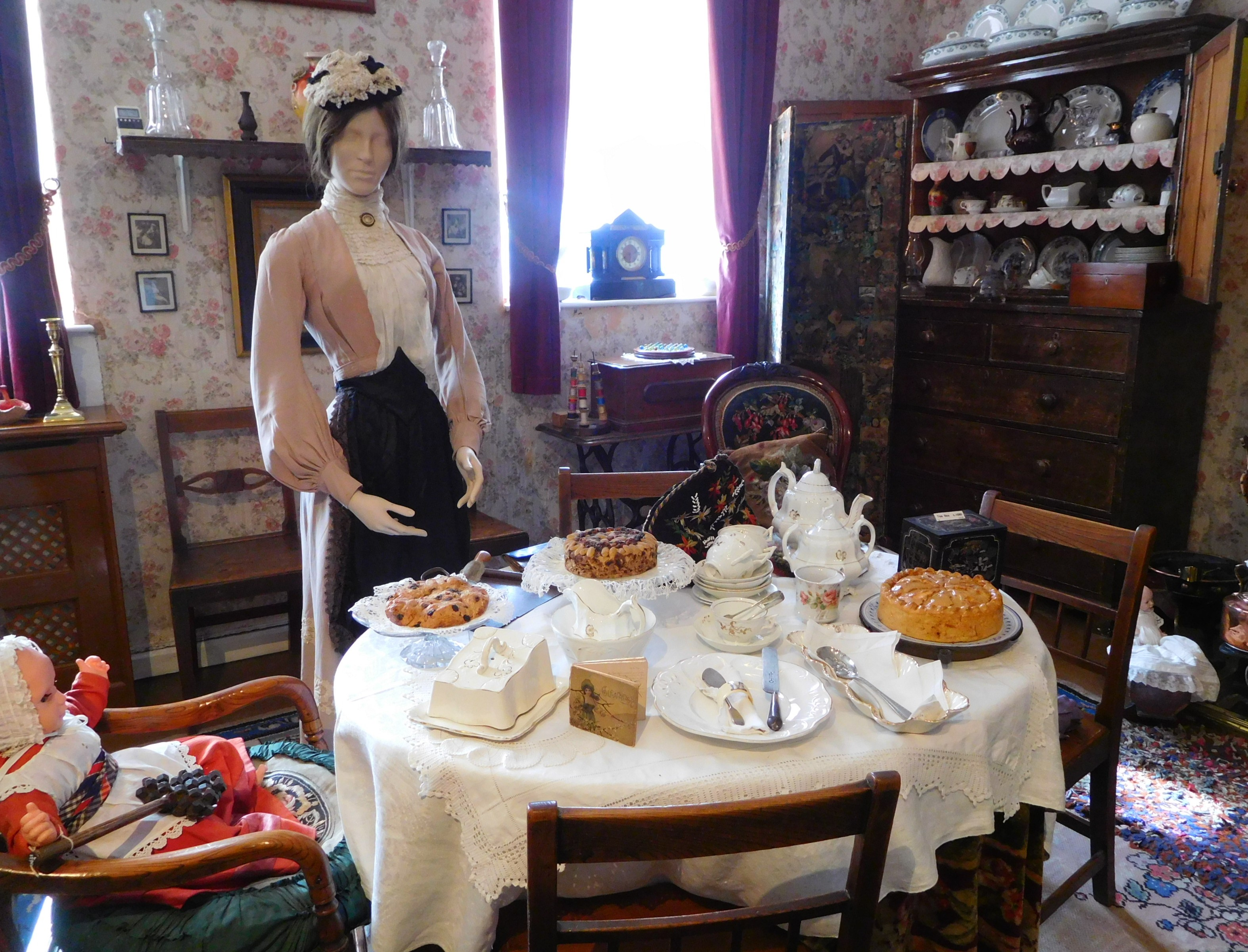
Recreation of a Victorian parlour at Nidderdale Museum, Yorkshire

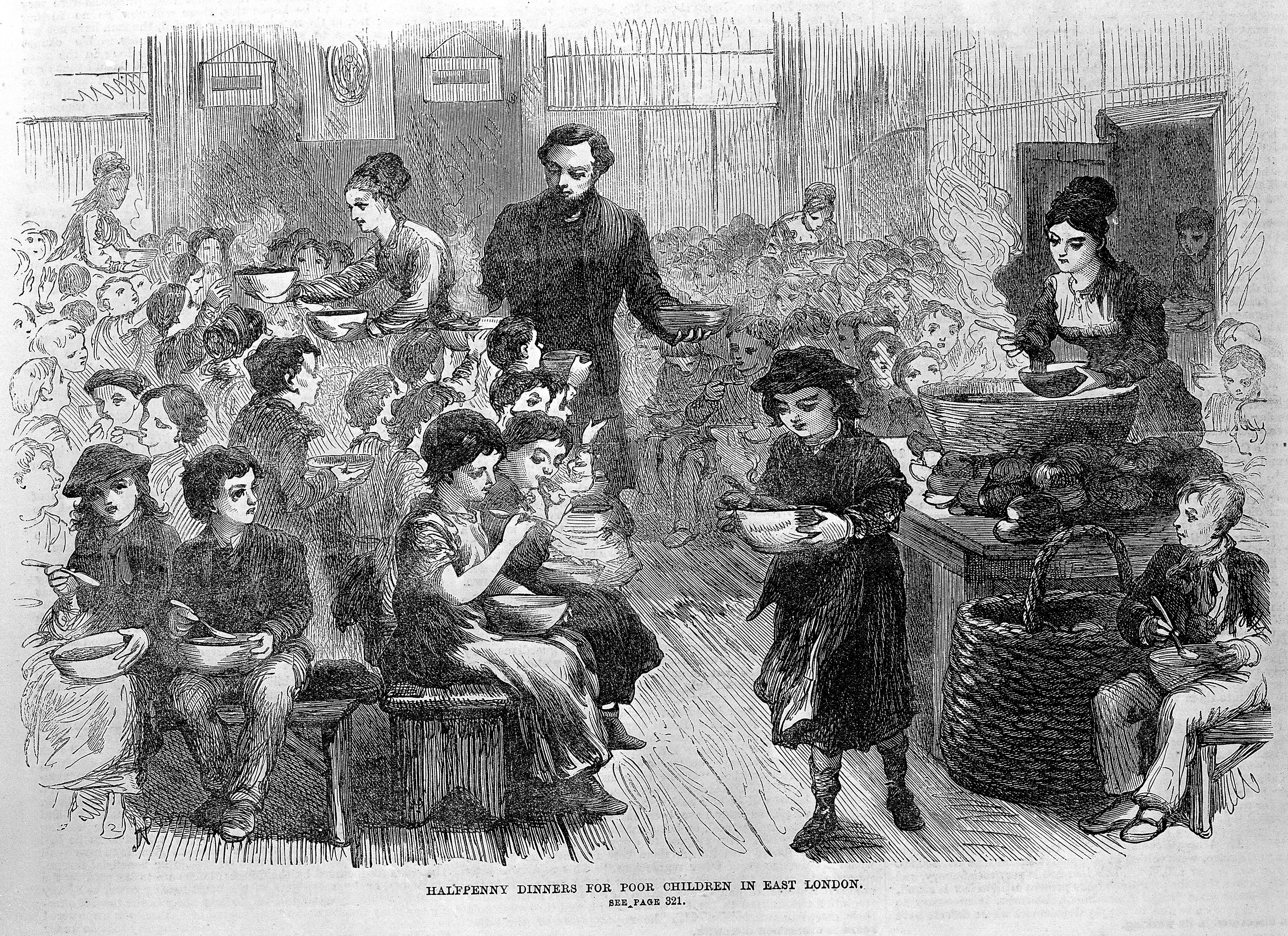
Cheap meals for poor children in East London (1870)

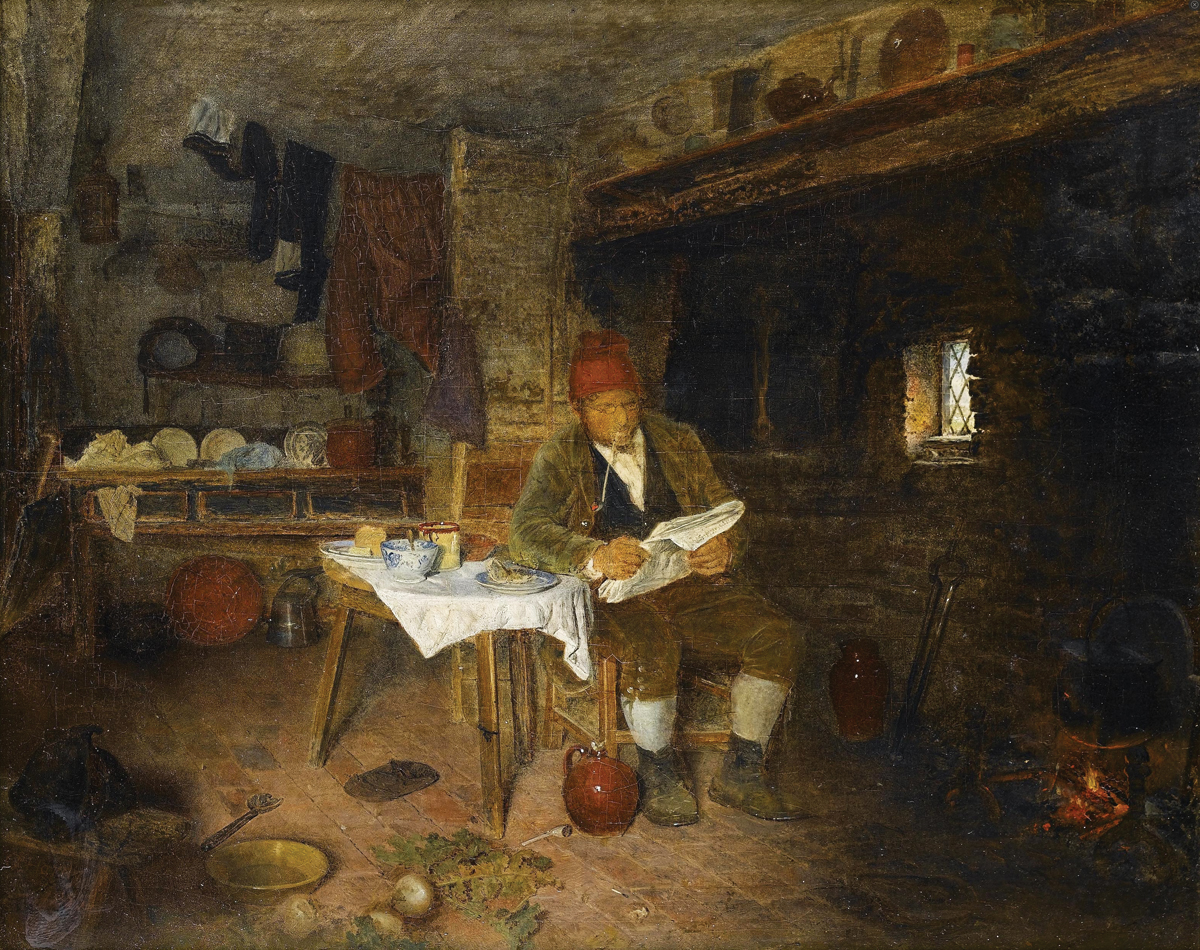
Leisure Hours (1855), depiction of a man resting by George Hardy

== Economy, industry, and trade ==
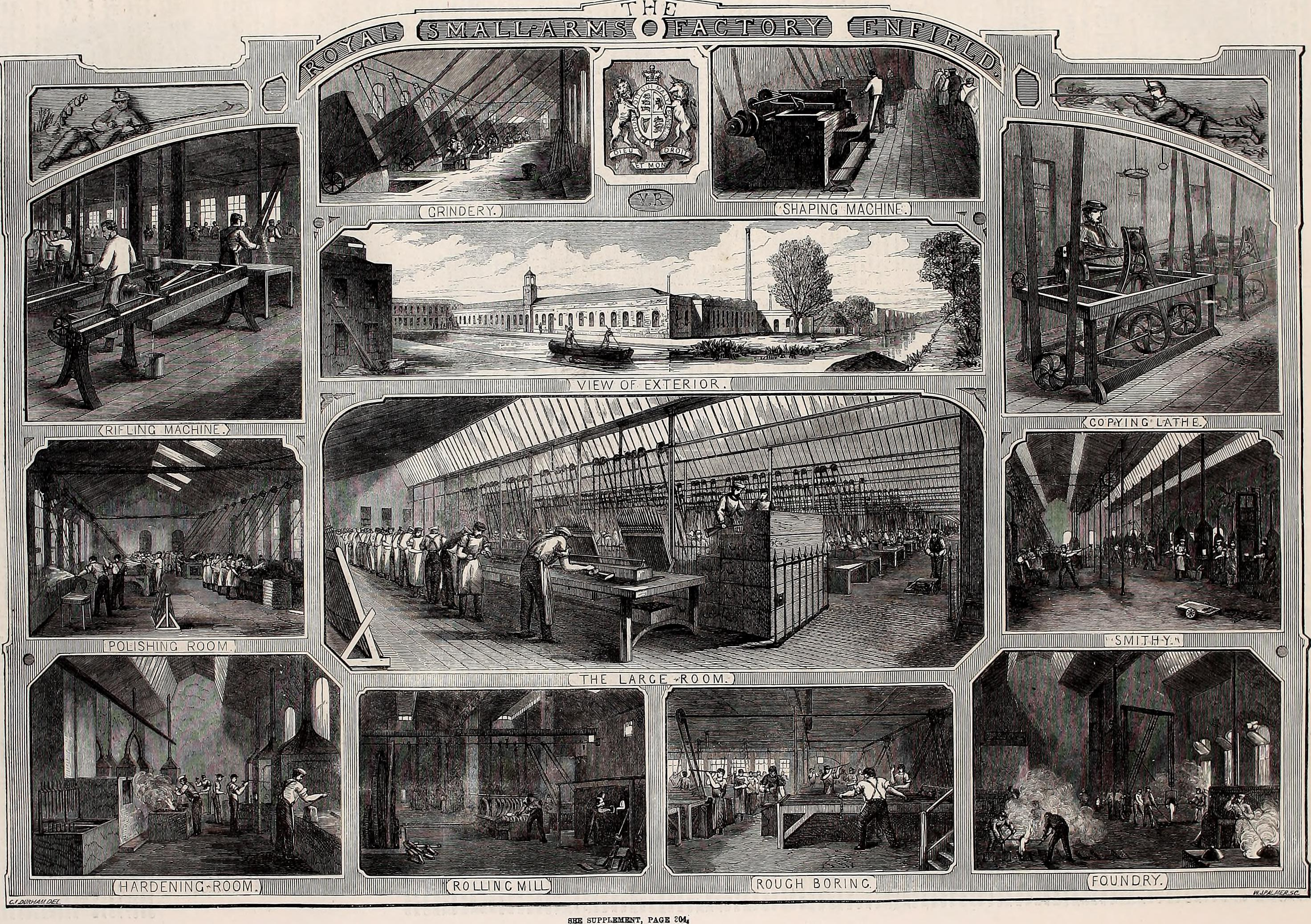
Illustrations of the Royal Small Arms Factory, Enfield in The Illustrated London News (1861)

Before the Industrial Revolution, daily life had changed little for hundreds of years. The 19th century saw rapid technological development with a wide range of new inventions. This led Great Britain to become the foremost industrial and trading nation of the time. Historians have characterised the mid-Victorian era (1850–1870) as Britain's 'Golden Years', with national income per person increasing by half. This prosperity was driven by increased industrialisation, especially in textiles and machinery, along with exports to the empire and elsewhere. The positive economic conditions, as well as a fashion among employers for providing welfare services to their workers, led to relative social stability. The Chartist movement for working-class men to be given the right to vote, which had been prominent in the early Victorian period, dissipated. Government involvement in the economy was limited. Only in the post–World War II period, around a century later, did the country experience substantial economic growth again. But while industry was well developed, education and the arts were mediocre. Wage rates continued to improve in the later 19th century: real wages (after taking inflation into account) were 65 per cent higher in 1901 compared to 1871. Much of the money was saved, as the number of depositors in savings banks rose from 430,000 in 1831 to 5.2 million in 1887, and their deposits from £14 million to over £90 million. English novelist gave favourable portrayals of early labour union operations.

=== Child labour ===
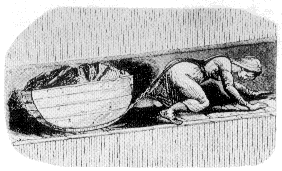
This illustration of a child drawer (a type of hurrier) pulling a coal tub was originally published in the Children's Employment Commission (Mines) 1842 report.

Children had always played a role in economic life but exploitation of their labour became especially intense during the Victorian era. Children were put to work in a wide range of occupations, but particularly associated with this period are factories. Employing children had advantages, as they were cheap, had limited ability to resist harsh working conditions, and could enter spaces too small for adults. Some accounts exist of happy upbringings involving child labour, but conditions were generally poor. Pay was low, punishments severe, work was dangerous and disrupted children's development (often leaving them too tired to play even in their free time). Early labour could do lifelong harm; even in the 1960s and 1970s, the elderly people of industrial towns were noted for their often unusually short stature, deformed physiques, and diseases associated with unhealthy working conditions. Reformers wanted the children in school. By the 1850s, around half of the children in England and Wales were in school (not including Sunday school). From the 1833 Factory Act onwards, attempts were made to get child labourers into part time education, though this was often difficult to achieve. Only in the 1870s and 1880s did children begin to be compelled into school. Work continued to inhibit children's schooling into the early 20th century.

== Housing and public health ==
Britain saw rapid urbanisation stimulated by the Industrial Revolution. In the 1901 census, more than three out of every four people were classified as living in an urban area, compared to one in five a century earlier. Historian Richard A. Soloway wrote that "Great Britain had become the most urbanized country in the West." The rapid growth in the urban population included the new industrial and manufacturing cities, as well as service centres such as Edinburgh and London. Private renting from housing landlords was the dominant tenure. P. Kemp says this was usually of advantage to tenants. Overcrowding was a major problem with seven or eight people frequently sleeping in a single room. Until at least the 1880s, sanitation was inadequate in areas such as water supply and disposal of sewage. This all had a negative effect on health, especially that of the impoverished young. For instance, of the babies born in Liverpool in 1851, only 45 per cent survived to the age of 20. Conditions were particularly bad in London, where the population rose sharply and poorly maintained, overcrowded dwellings became slum housing. Kellow Chesney wrote of the situation:

Hideous slums, some of them acres wide, some no more than crannies of obscure misery, make up a substantial part of the metropolis... In big, once handsome houses, thirty or more people of all ages may inhabit a single room

Hunger and poor diet was a common aspect of life across the UK in the Victorian period, especially in the 1840s, but the mass starvation seen in the Great Famine in Ireland was unique. Levels of poverty fell significantly during the 19th century from as much as two thirds of the population in 1800 to less than a third by 1901. However, 1890s studies suggested that almost 10% of the urban population lived in a state of desperation lacking the food necessary to maintain basic physical functions. Attitudes towards the poor were often unsympathetic and they were frequently blamed for their situation. In that spirit, the Poor Law Amendment Act 1834 had been deliberately designed to punish them and would remain the basis for welfare provision into the 20th century. While many people were prone to vices, not least alcoholism, historian Bernard A. Cook argues that the main reason for 19th-century poverty was that typical wages for much of the population were simply too low—barely enough to provide a subsistence living in good times, let alone to save up against bad times.

Over time, improvements were made to housing, along with the management of sewage and water; this eventually gave the UK the most advanced system of public health protection anywhere in the world. The quality and safety of household lighting improved over the period with oil lamps becoming the norm in the early 1860s, gas lighting in the 1890s and electric lights beginning to appear in the homes of the richest by the end of the period. Medicine advanced rapidly during the 19th century, and the germ theory was developed for the first time. Doctors became more specialised and the number of hospitals grew. The overall number of deaths fell by about 20%. The life expectancy of women increased from around 42 to 55 and 40 to 56 for men. (Note: These life expectancy figures are rounded to the nearest whole.) In spite of this, the mortality rate fell only marginally, from 20.8 per thousand in 1850 to 18.2 by the end of the century. Urbanisation aided the spread of diseases and squalid living conditions in many places exacerbated the problem. The population of England, Scotland and Wales grew rapidly during the 19th century. Various factors are considered to have contributed to this, including a rising fertility rate (though it was falling by the end of the period), the lack of a catastrophic pandemic or famine in the island of Great Britain during the 19th century for the first time in history, improved nutrition, and a lower overall mortality rate. Ireland's population shrank significantly, mostly due to emigration and the Great Famine.

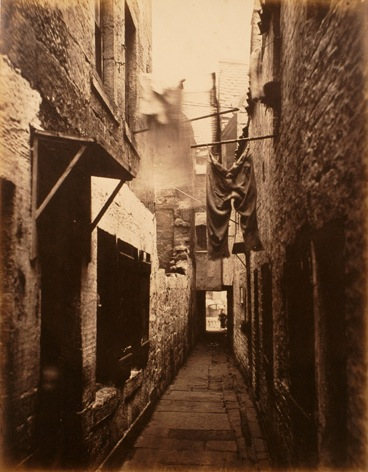
Slum area in Glasgow (1871)

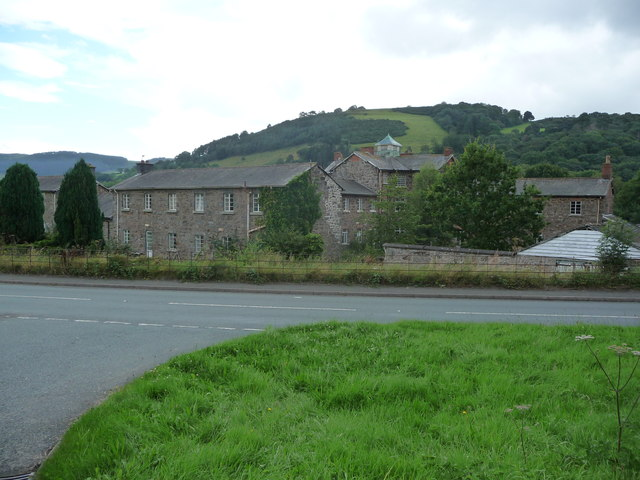
Buildings originally built as Llanfyllin workhouse, a state-funded home for the destitute which operated from 1838 to 1930

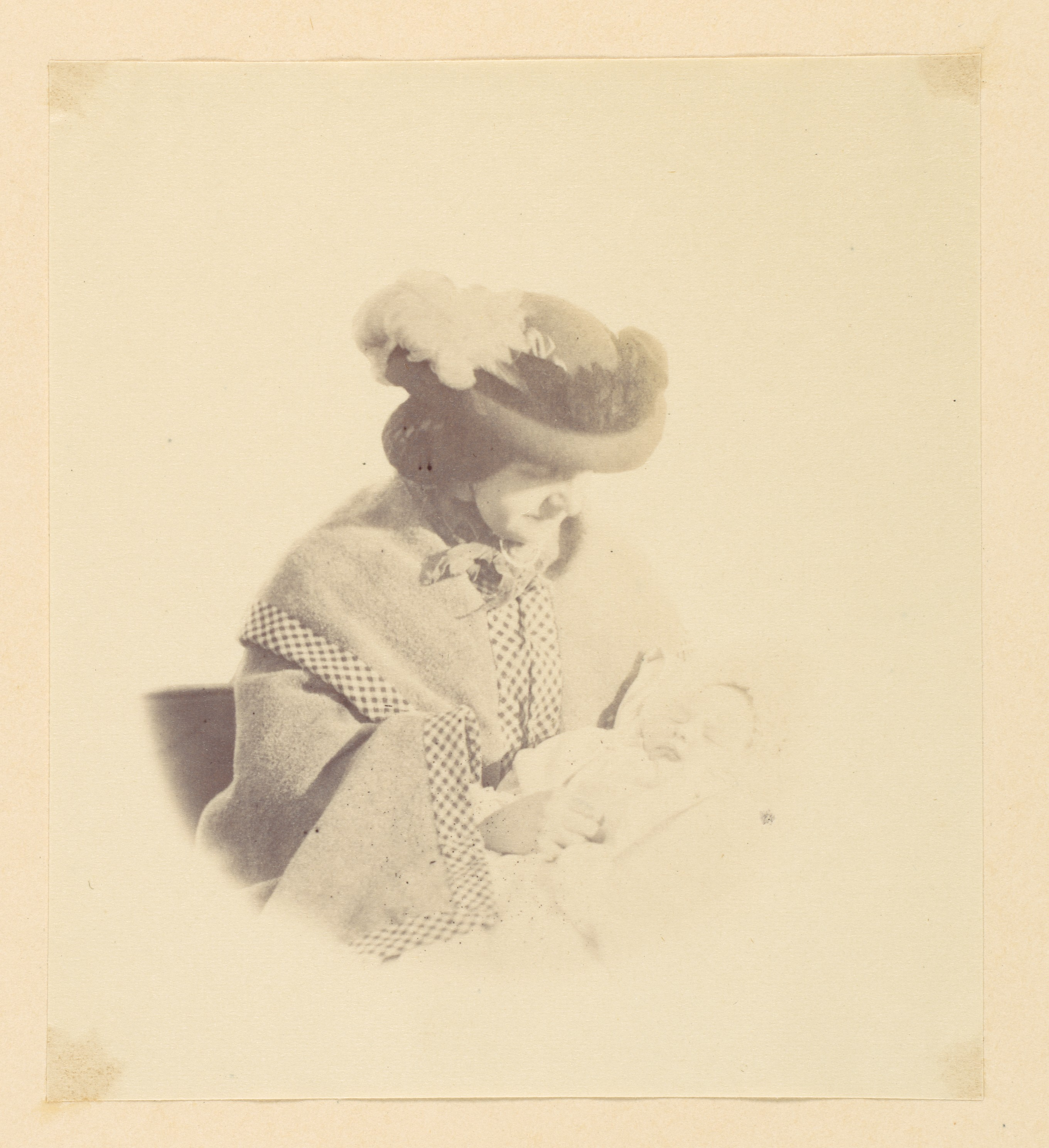
Photograph of a mother and baby by Alfred Capel-Cure (c. 1850s or 1860s)

== Knowledge ==
=== Science ===
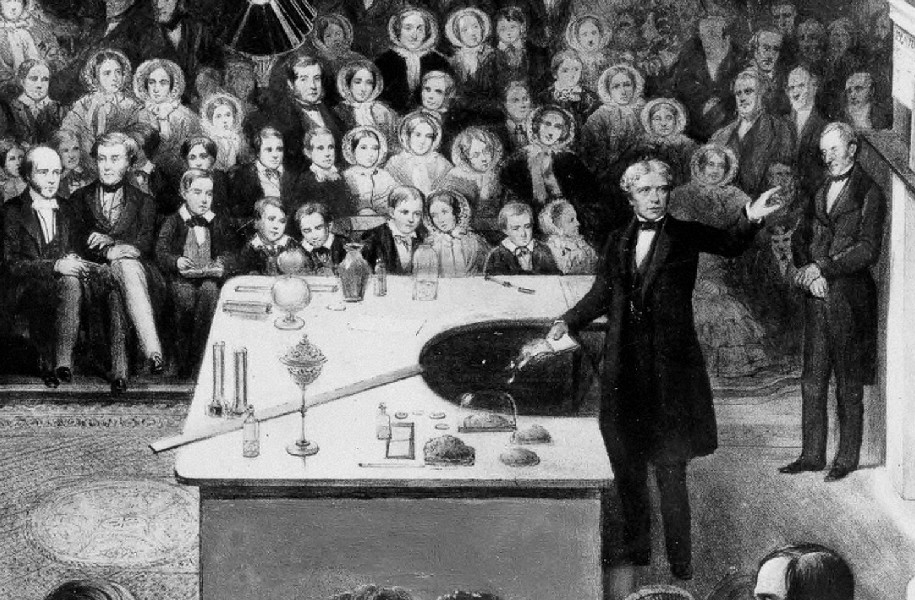
Michael Faraday delivering a Christmas Lecture at the Royal Institution, c. 1855

The professionalisation of scientific study began in parts of Europe following the French Revolution but was slow to reach Britain. William Whewell coined the term scientist in 1833 to refer to those who studied what was generally then known as natural philosophy, but it took a while to catch on. Having been previously dominated by amateurs with a separate income, the Royal Society admitted only professionals from 1847 onwards. The British biologist Thomas Henry Huxley indicated in 1852 that it remained difficult to earn a living as a scientist alone. Scientific knowledge and debates such as that about Charles Darwin's On the Origin of Species (1859), which sought to explain biological evolution by natural selection, gained a high profile in the public consciousness. Simplified (and at times inaccurate) popular science was increasingly distributed through a variety of publications, which caused tension with the professionals. There were significant advances in various fields of research, including statistics, elasticity, refrigeration, natural history, electromagnetism, and logic.

=== Industry ===
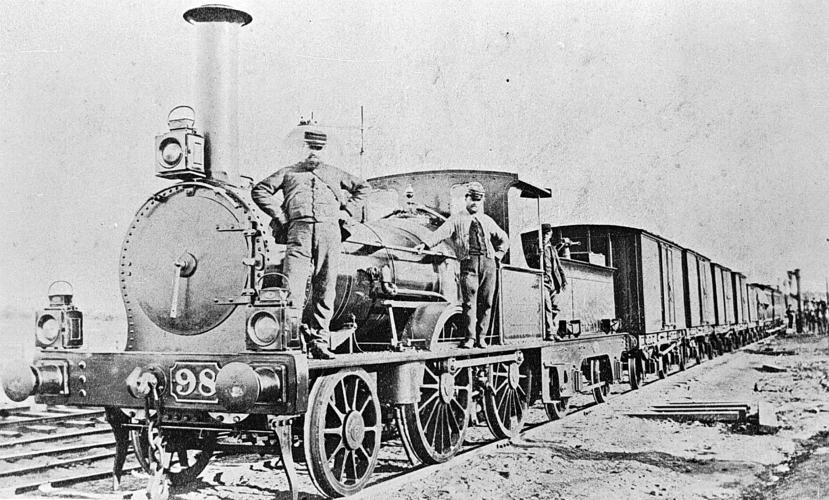
A railway crew (1873)

Known as the 'workshop of the world', Britain was uniquely advanced in technology in the mid-19th century. Engineering, having developed into a profession in the 18th century, gained new profile and prestige in this period. The Victorian era saw methods of communication and transportation develop significantly. In 1837, William Fothergill Cooke and Charles Wheatstone invented the first telegraph system. This system, which used electrical currents to transmit coded messages, quickly spread across Britain, appearing in every town and post office. A worldwide network developed towards the end of the century. In 1876, the American Alexander Graham Bell patented the telephone. A little over a decade later, 26,000 telephones were in service in Britain. Multiple switchboards were installed in every major town and city. Guglielmo Marconi developed early radio broadcasting at the end of the period. The railways were important economically in the Victorian era, allowing rapid transport of goods, raw materials, and people, stimulating trade and industry. They were also a major employer and industry in their own right.

== Moral standards ==
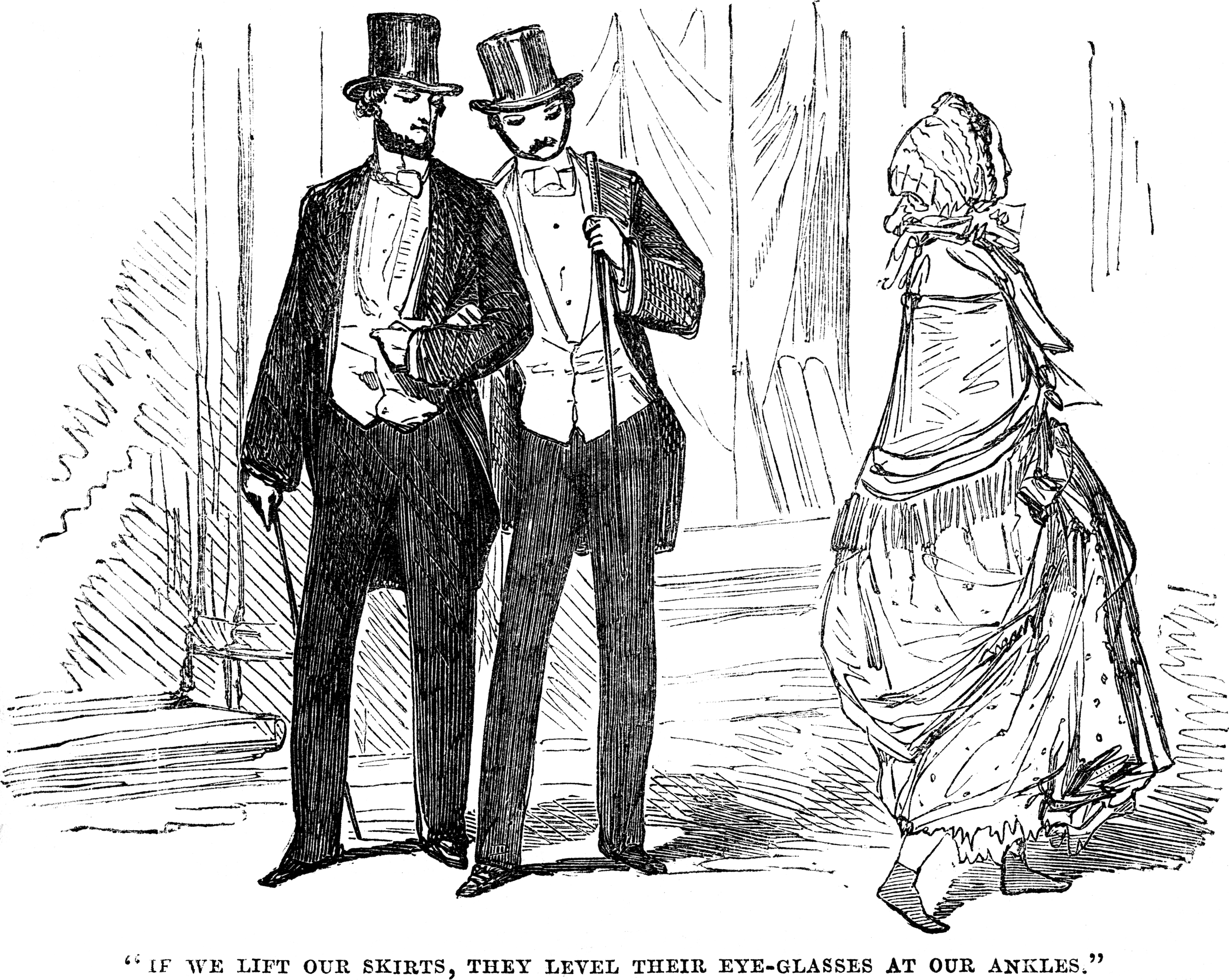
If we lift our skirts they level their eye-glasses at our ankles (1854), cartoon suggesting that men saw women lifting their dresses as a titillating opportunity to see some of their body shape

Expected standards of personal conduct changed in around the first half of the 19th century, with good manners and self-restraint becoming much more common. Historians have suggested various contributing factors, such as Britain's major conflicts with France during the early 19th century, meaning that the distracting temptations of sinful behaviour had to be avoided in order to focus on the war effort, and the evangelical movement's push for moral improvement. There is evidence that the expected standards of moral behaviour were reflected in action as well as rhetoric across all classes of society. For instance, an analysis suggested that less than 5% of working class couples lived together before marriage.

Historian Harold Perkin argued that the change in moral standards led by the middle of the 19th century to 'diminished cruelty to animals, criminals, lunatics, and children (in that order)'. Legal restrictions were placed on cruelty to animals. Restrictions were placed on the working hours of child labourers in the 1830s and 1840s. Further interventions took place throughout the century to increase the level of child protection. Use of the death penalty also decreased. Crime rates fell significantly in the second half of the 19th century. Sociologist Christie Davies linked this change to attempts to morally educate the population, especially at Sunday schools.

=== Sexual behaviour ===
Contrary to popular belief, Victorian society understood that both men and women enjoyed copulation. Chastity was expected of women, whilst attitudes to male sexual behaviour were more relaxed. The development of police forces led to a rise in prosecutions for illegal sodomy in the middle of the 19th century. Male sexuality became a favourite subject of medical researchers' study. For the first time, all male homosexual acts were outlawed. Concern about sexual exploitation of adolescent girls increased during the period, especially following the white slavery scandal, which contributed to the increasing of the age of consent from 13 to 16.

At a time when job options for women were limited and generally low-paying, some women, particularly those without familial support, took to prostitution to support themselves. Attitudes in public life and among the general population to prostitution varied. Evidence about prostitutes' situation also varies. One contemporary study argues that the trade was a short-term stepping stone to a different lifestyle for many women, while another, more recent study argues they were subject to physical abuse, financial exploitation, state persecution, and difficult working conditions. Due to worries about venereal disease, especially among soldiers, women suspected of prostitution were for a period between the 1860s and 1880s subject to spot compulsory examinations for sexually transmitted infections, and detainment if they were found to be infected. This caused a great deal of resentment among women in general due to the principle underlying the checks, that women had to be controlled in order to be safe for sexual use by men, and the checks were opposed by some of the earliest feminist campaigning.

== See also ==
- 19th-century London
- Political and diplomatic history of the Victorian era
- Society and culture of the Victorian era
- Religion in Victorian England
- History of public health in the United Kingdom
- Theatre in the Victorian era
- Victorian burlesque
- Victorian fashion
- Victorian house
- Victorian jewellery
- Victorian masculinity
- Victorian morality
- Victorian painting
- Women in the Victorian era
