= Political and diplomatic history of the Victorian era =

Political and diplomatic history of the Victorian era refers to politics in the United Kingdom and British Empire during the reign of Queen Victoria, 1837-1901.

== Early period ==
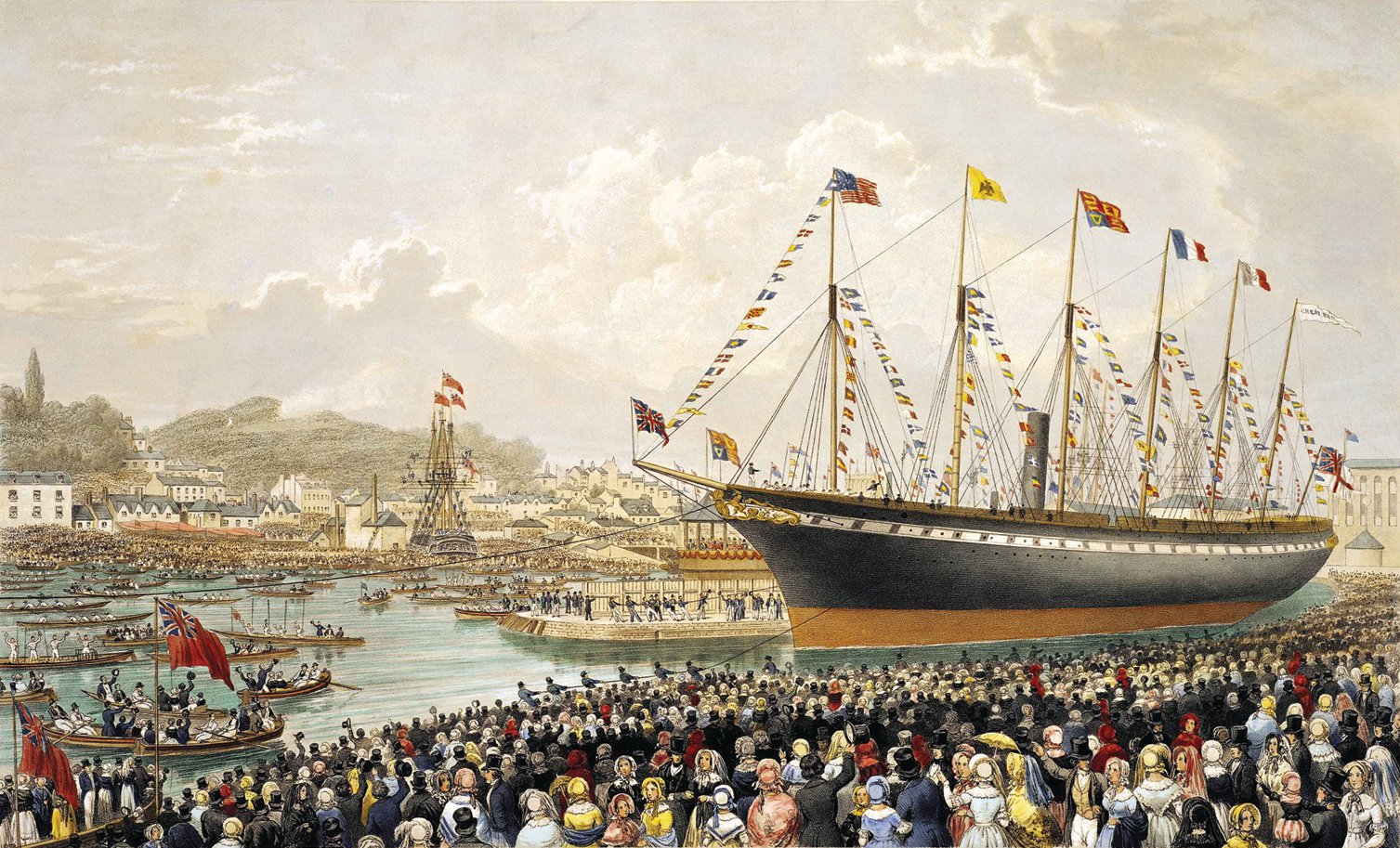
The 1843 launch of the Great Britain, the revolutionary ship of Isambard Kingdom Brunel

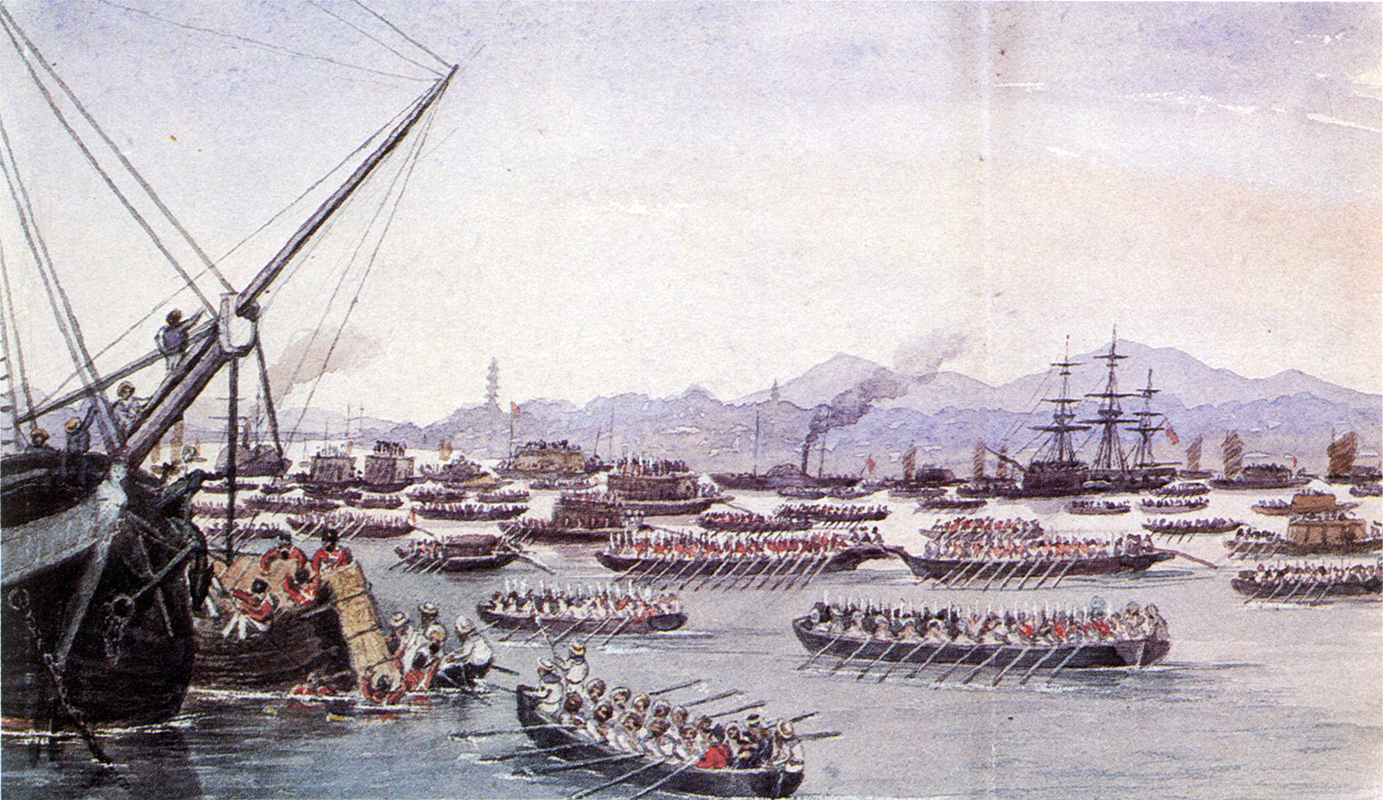
First Opium War: British ships approaching Canton in May 1841

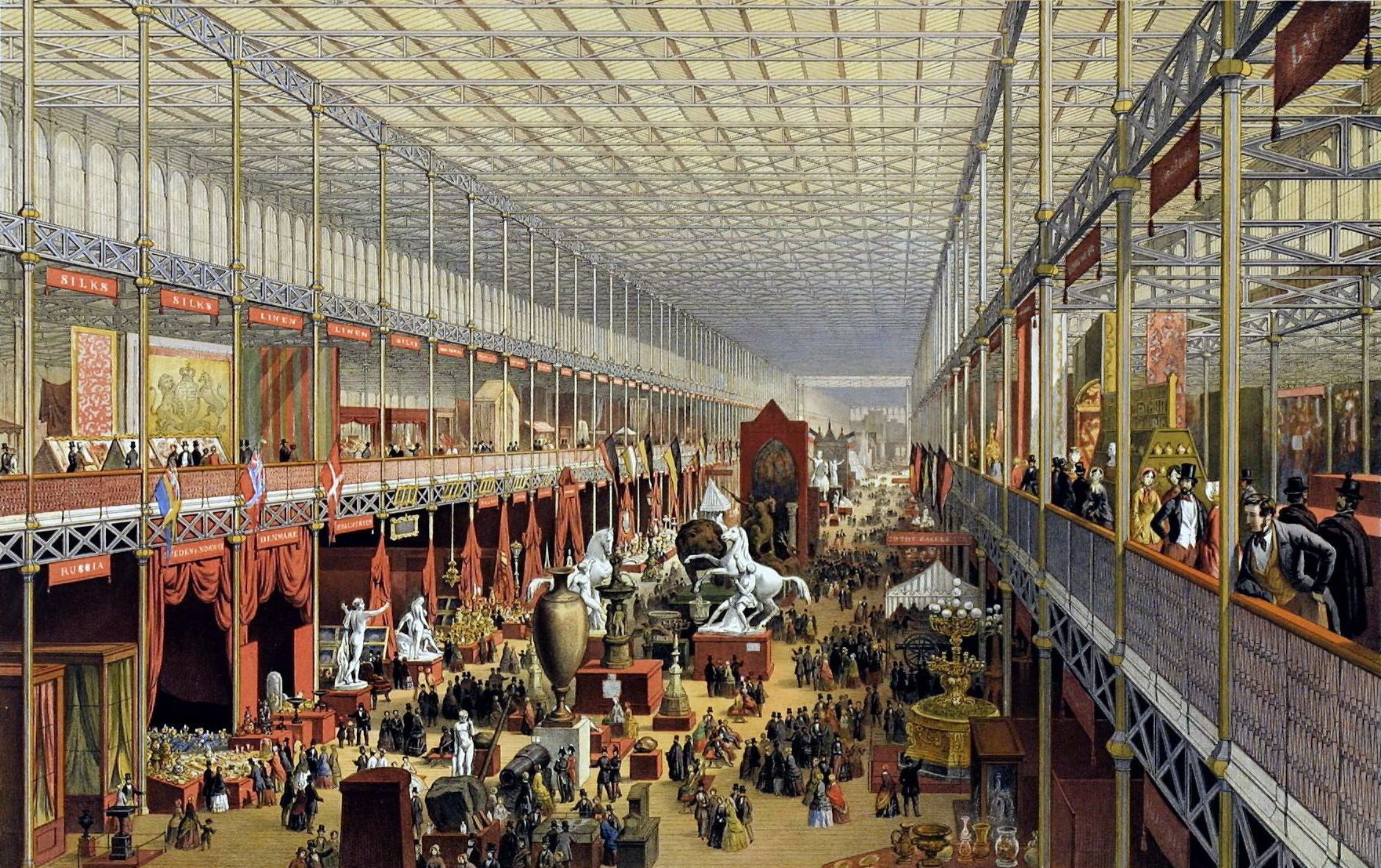
The Great Exhibition in London. The United Kingdom was the first country in the world to industrialise.

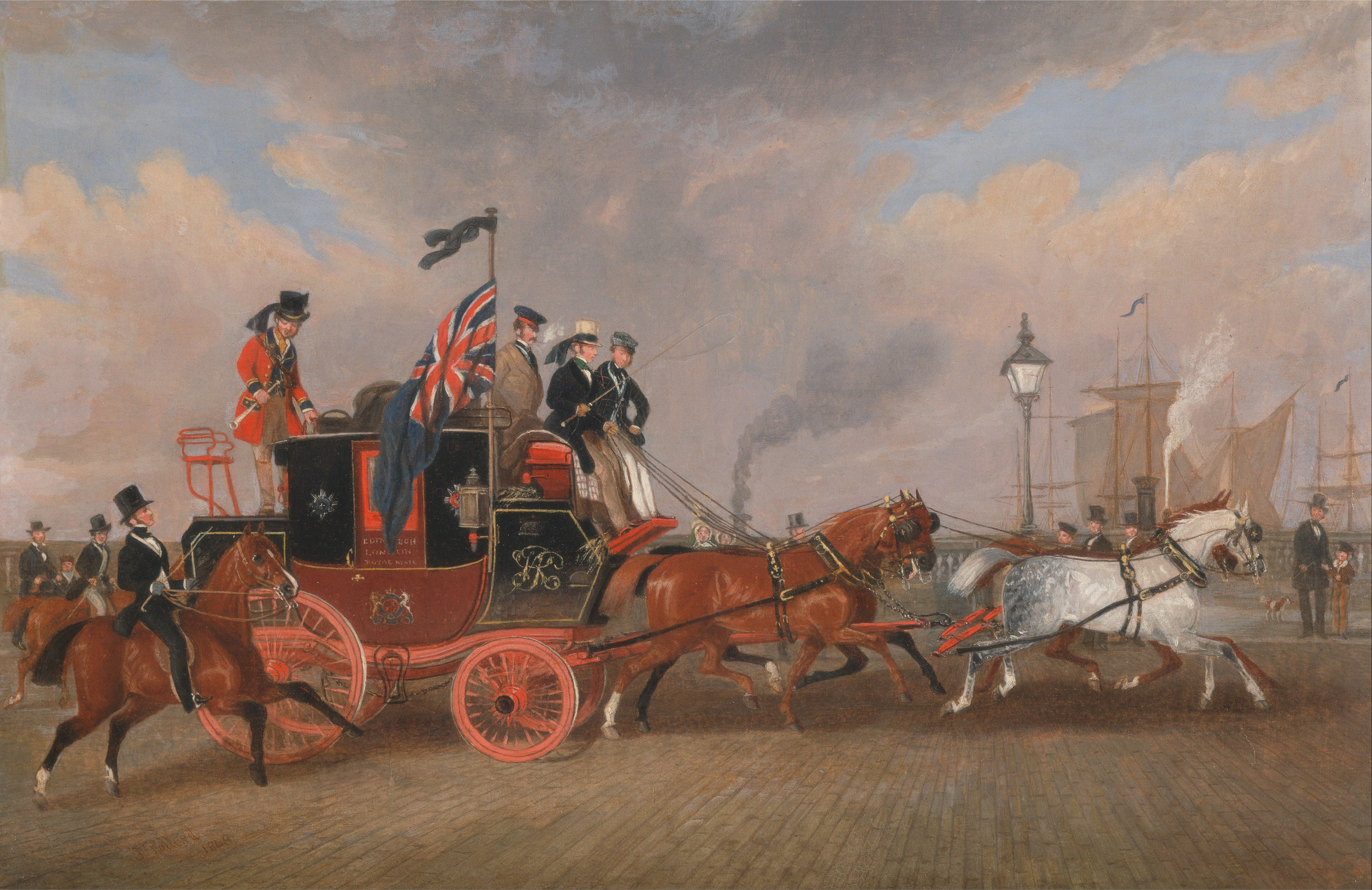
The last of the mail coaches at Newcastle upon Tyne, 1848

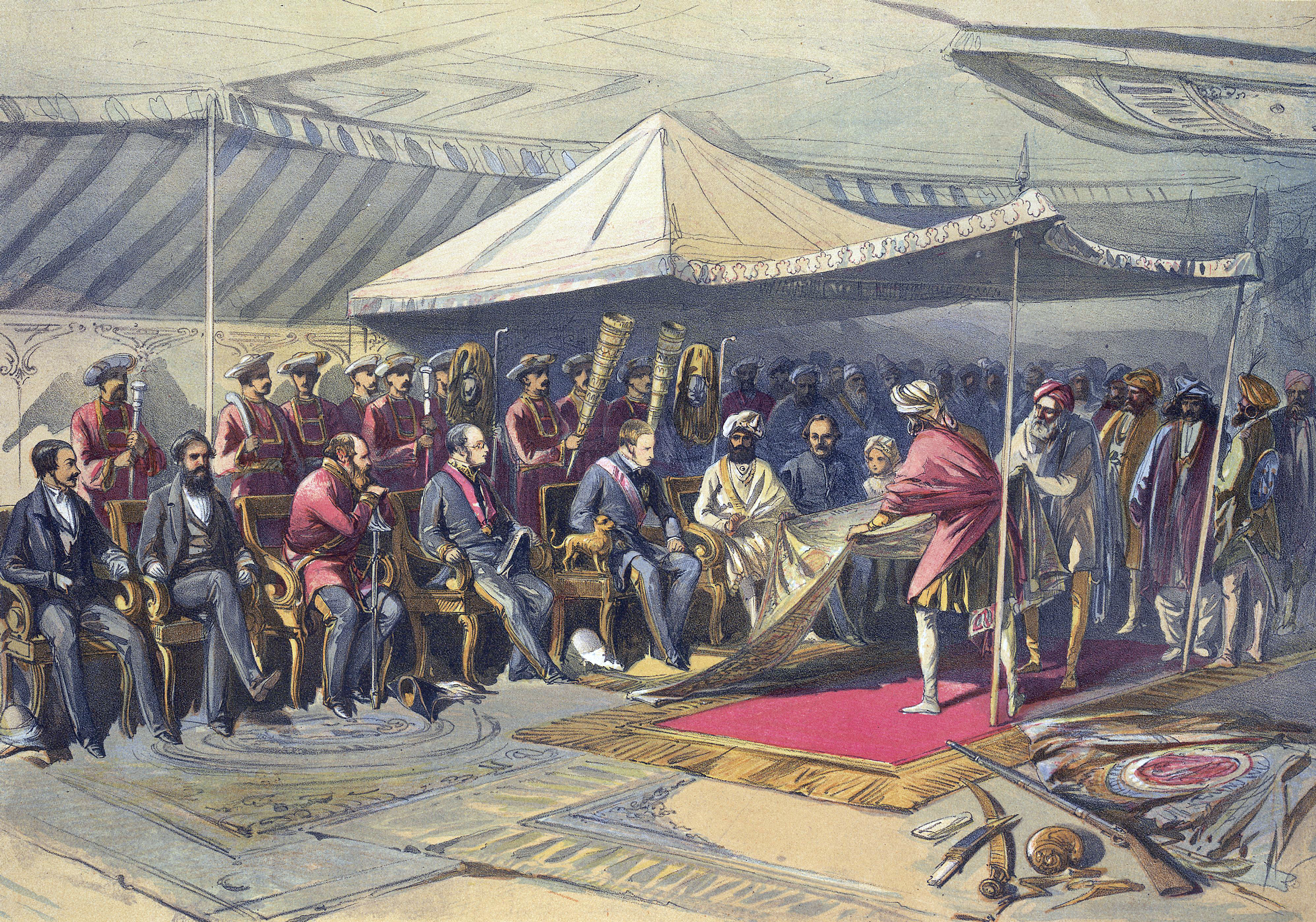
Governor-General of India Lord Canning meets Maharaja Ranbir Singh of Jammu and Kashmir, 1860

In 1832, after much political agitation, the Great Reform Act was passed. It abolished many tiny seats and created new seats for the fast-growing cities. It expanded the franchise in England and Wales (a Scottish Reform Act and Irish Reform Act were passed separately).

On 20 June 1837, Victoria became Queen of the United Kingdom on the death of her uncle, King William IV, just weeks after reaching the age of eighteen. Her government was led by the Whig prime minister Lord Melbourne, to whom she was close.

Britain sent Lord Durham to Canada to resolve its constitutional crisis. His Durham Report in 1839 opened the way for "responsible government" (that is, self-government).

In 1839, a seizure of British opium exports to China prompted the First Opium War against the Qing dynasty.

British defense of India initiated the First Anglo-Afghan War—one of the first major conflicts of the Great Game between Britain and Russia.

In South Africa, the Dutch Boers made their Great Trek to found Natal, the Transvaal, and the Orange Free State, defeating the Zulus in the process, 1835–1838; Britain annexed Natal in 1843 but recognised the independence of the Transvaal in 1852 in the Orange Free State in 1854.

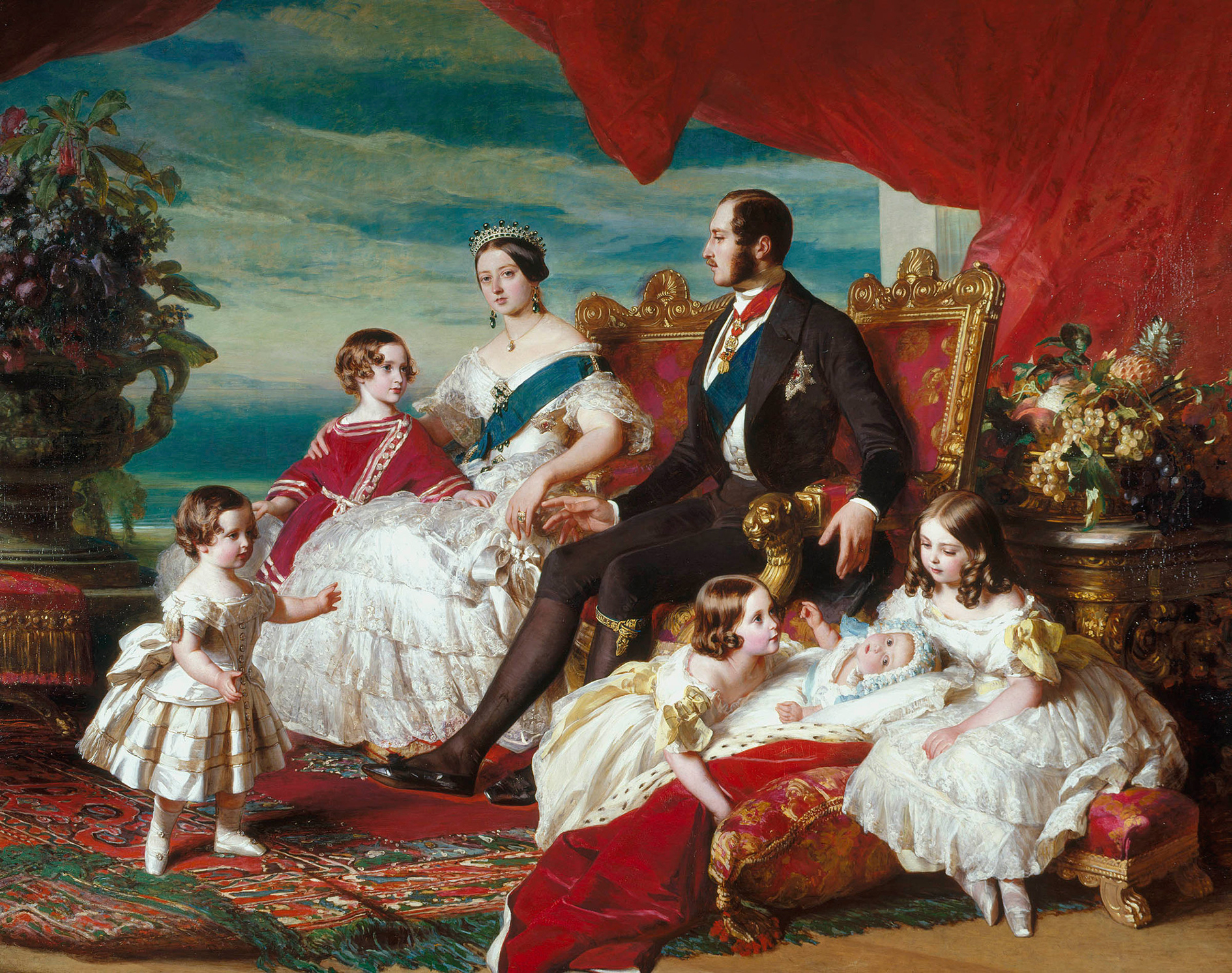
Queen Victoria, Prince Albert, and five of their children in 1846. Painting by Franz Xaver Winterhalter.

In 1840, Queen Victoria married her German cousin Prince Albert of Saxe-Coburg-Saalfield. It proved a passionate marriage, whose children were much sought after by royal families across Europe. An astute diplomat, the Queen was only too willing to arrange such marriages. Indeed, she became the "Grandmother of Europe" thanks to the nine children she had with Prince Albert in just sixteen years despite suffering from postnatal depression and her dislike of childbirth. Unfortunately, she carried the gene for haemophilia, which affected ten of her male descendants, including the heir apparent of Tsar Nicholas II.

In Australia, new provinces were founded with Victoria in 1835 and South Australia in 1842. The focus shifted from transportation of criminals to voluntary immigration. New Zealand became a British colony in 1839; in 1840 Maori chiefs ceded sovereignty to Britain in Treaty of Waitangi. In 1841 New Zealand became an autonomous colony. The signing of the Treaty of Nanking in 1842 ended the First Opium War and gave Britain control over Hong Kong Island. However, a disastrous retreat from Kabul in the same year led to the annihilation of a British army column in Afghanistan. The Massacre of Elphinstone's Army by the Afghans results in the death or incarceration of 16,500 soldiers and civilians.

In Ireland in 1845, the Great Famine began to cause mass starvation, disease and death, sparking large-scale emigration. To allow more cheap food into Ireland, the Peel government repealed the Corn Laws.

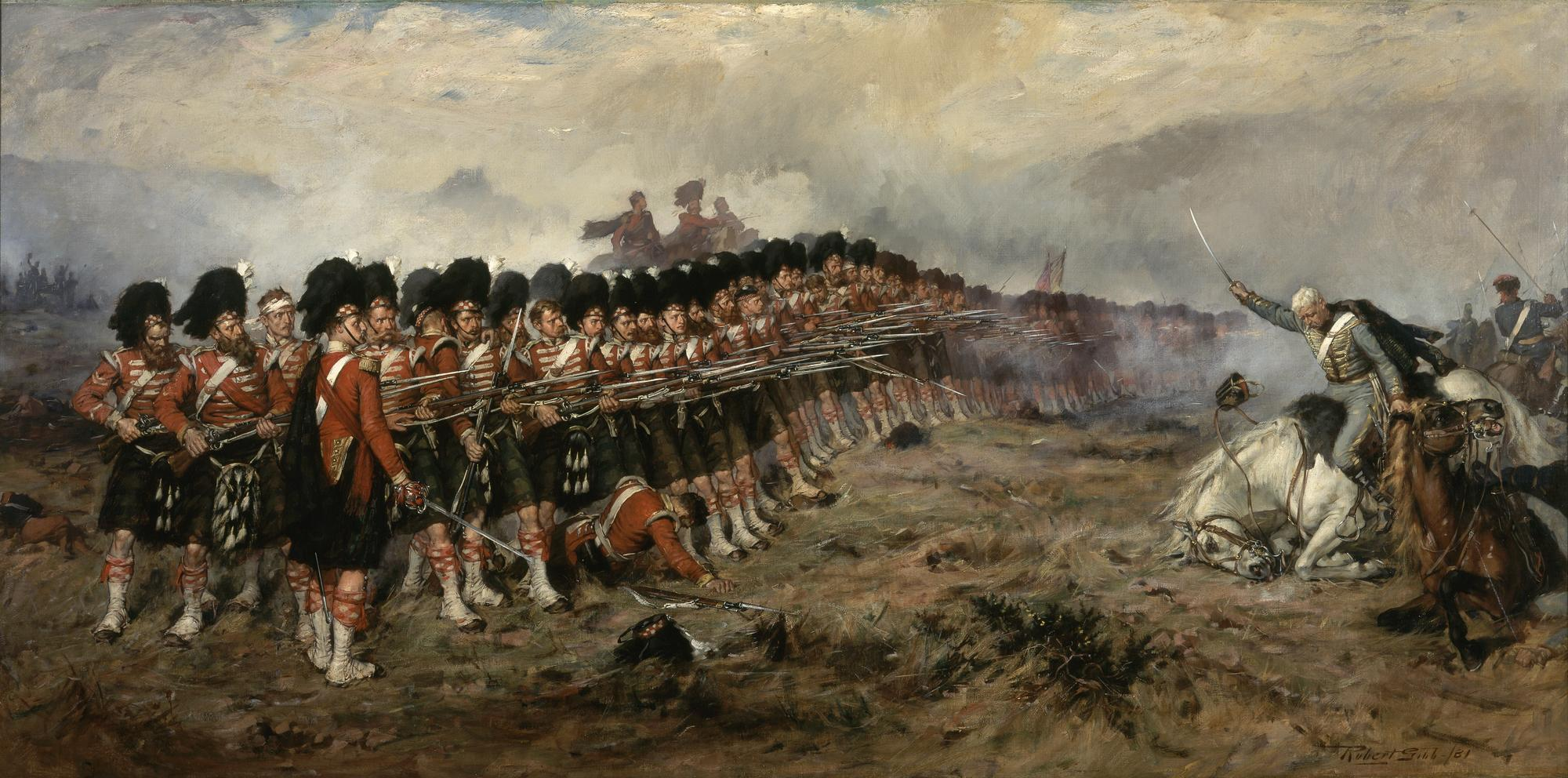
The Thin Red Line at the Battle of Balaclava, where the 93rd Sutherland Highlanders held off Russian cavalry.

In Australia the gold rush began in 1851. In ten years, the Australian population nearly tripled.

In 1853, Britain fought alongside France in the Crimean War against Russia. The goal was to ensure that Russia could not benefit from the declining status of the Ottoman Empire, a strategic consideration known as the Eastern Question. The conflict marked a rare breach in the Pax Britannica, the period of relative peace (1815–1914) that existed among the Great Powers of the time, and especially in Britain's interaction with them. On its conclusion in 1856 with the Treaty of Paris, Russia was prohibited from hosting a military presence in Crimea. It was during the Crimean War that the Queen introduced the Victoria Cross, awarded on the basis of valour and merit regardless of rank. The first Crosses were handed out to 62 men in a ceremony at Hyde Park in 1857, the first time officers and men were decorated together.

In October 1856, the Second Opium War saw Britain overpower the Qing dynasty in China. Along with other major powers, Britain took steps in obtaining special trading and legal rights in a limited number of treaty ports.

During 1857–58, an uprising by sepoys against the East India Company was suppressed. This led to the end of Company rule in India and the transferral of administration to direct rule by the British government. The princely states were not affected and remained under British guidance. English was imposed as the medium of education.

=== Corn Law repeal 1846 ===
The Corn Laws were tariffs enforced between 1815 and 1846 on grains (called "corn" and including maize, wheat, oats and barley) imported into the United Kingdom. They raised the price of food for everyone and benefitted rich landholders by limiting the import of corn when prices were low. The Corn Laws enhanced the profits and political power associated with land ownership. The old laws raised the cost of living for the British public, and diverted money away from industry.

The demand for repeal became the goal of intense agitation from urban groups who had far less political power than rural landowners.The first two years of the Great Famine in Ireland of 1845–1852 forced a resolution because of the urgent need for new food supplies. Prime Minister Sir Robert Peel played the decisive role. After the defeat of the Tory Party in 1830, he rebuilt the party, renamed it the Conservative Party, and led it to victory in 1841. He now favored repeal of the Corn Laws by Parliament, and used a third of the Conservative MPs and all of the Whigs to pass the legislation in 1846. Soon on the Irish issue the Conservatives lost the 1847 election; Peel never held high office again.

The repeal marked a decisive shift towards free trade in Britain across the next half century. The repeal benefitted the bottom 90% of income earners economically, while causing income losses for the top 10%.

== Middle period ==
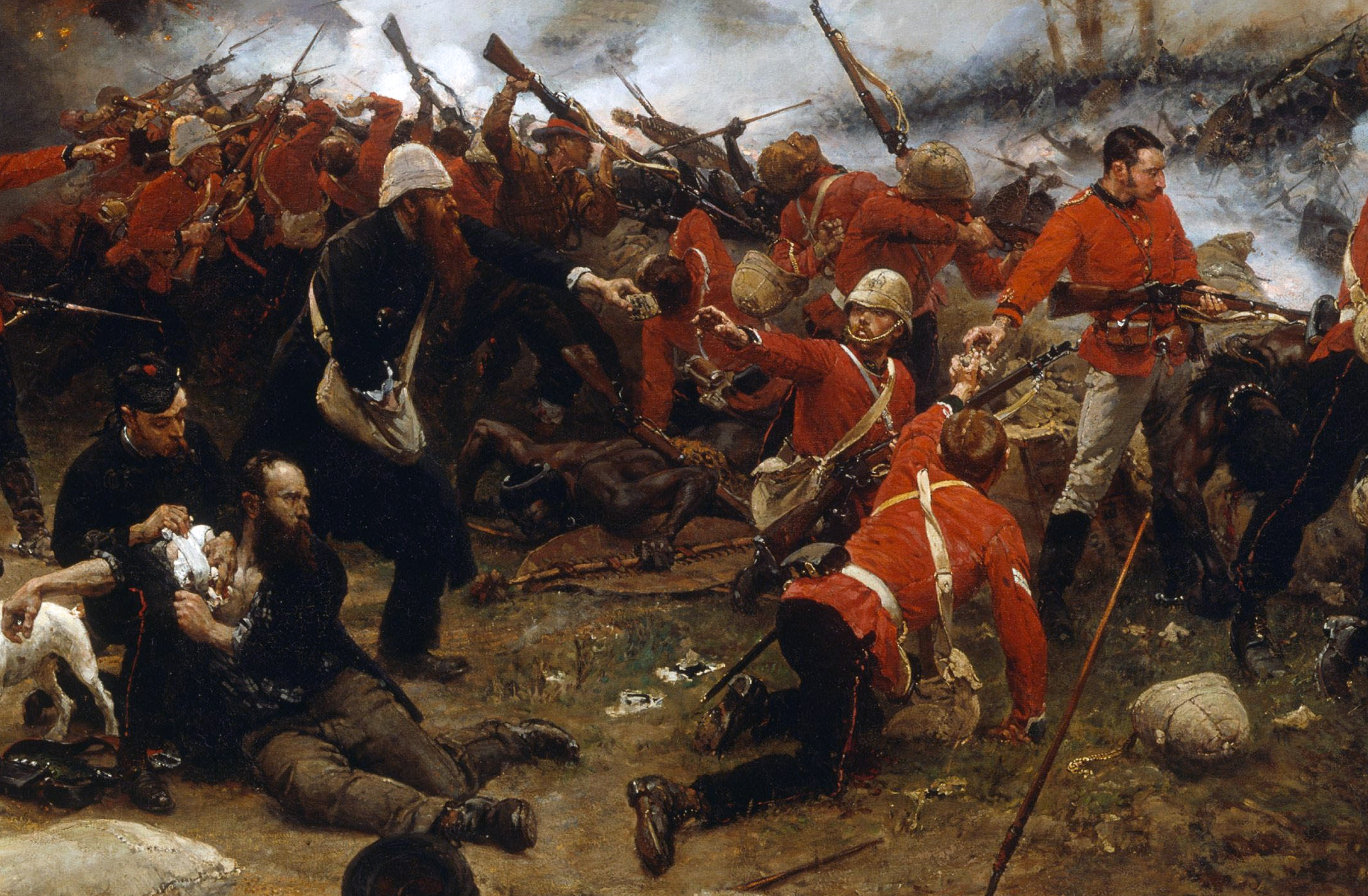
The defence of Rorke's Drift during the Anglo-Zulu War of 1879

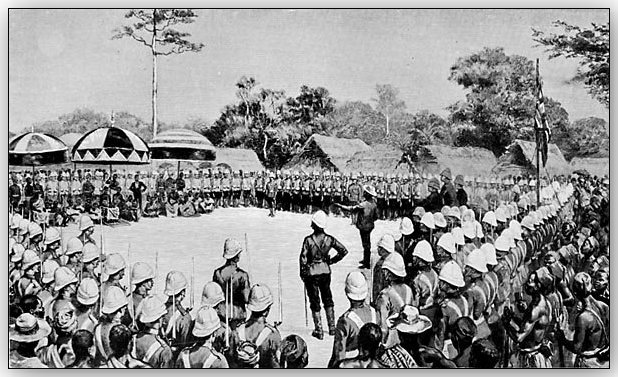
Following the Fourth Anglo-Ashanti War in 1896, the British proclaimed a protectorate over the Ashanti Empire.

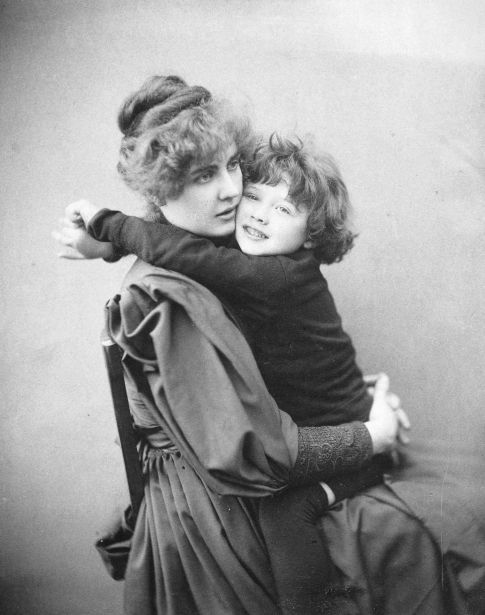
The author Constance Wilde, wife of Oscar Wilde, pictured with son Cyril, 1889

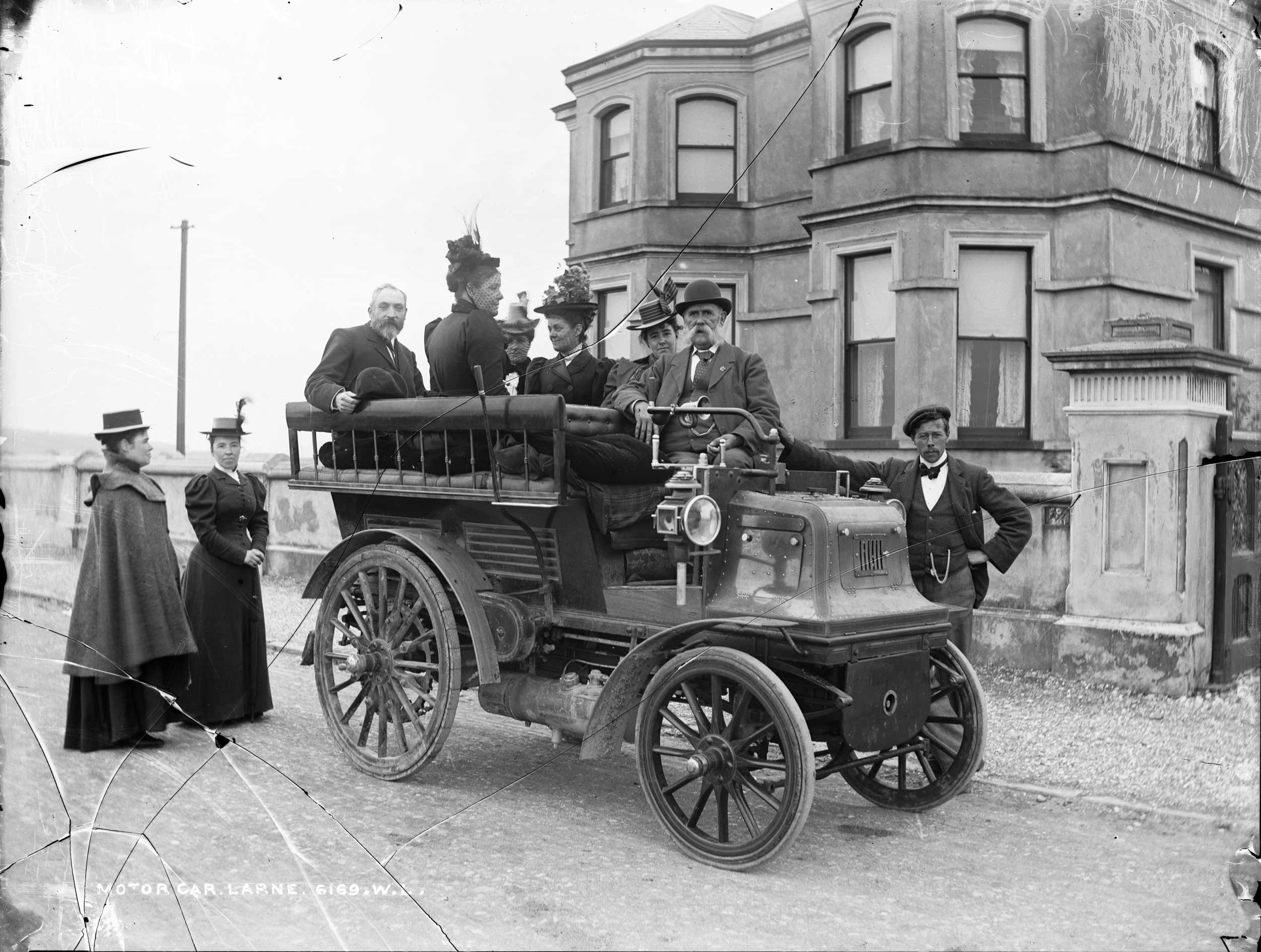
Daimler Wagonette, Ireland, c. 1899

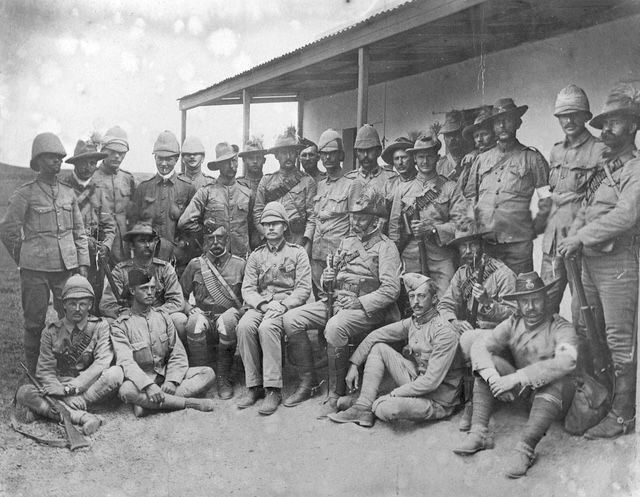
British and Australian officers in South Africa during the Second Boer War

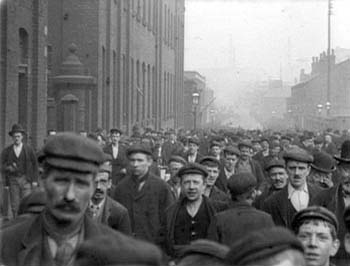
Workmen leaving Platt's Works, Oldham, 1900

In 1861, Prince Albert died. Queen Victoria went into mourning and withdrew from public life for ten years.

In 1861 Britain purchased Egypt's shares in the Suez Canal as the African nation was forced to raise money to pay off its debts. By the 1880s the British were in effective control of Egypt.

Whilst the cabinet leaned toward recognition of the Confederacy during the American Civil War, public opinion was split. Confederate foreign policy planners had hoped that the value of their cotton exports would encourage European powers to intervene in their favour. It was not to be, and the British attitude might have been decisive. Being cut off from cotton did not affect the British economy as much as the Confederates had expected. A considerable supply was available to Great Britain when the American Civil War erupted and she was able to turn to India and Egypt as alternatives when that ran out. In the end, the government decided to remain neutral upon realising that war with the United States would be highly dangerous, for that country provided much of Britain's food supply (especially wheat) and its navy could sink much of the merchant fleet. U.S. ambassador to Britain Charles Francis Adams Sr. succeeded in resolving thorny problems that could have driven the two powers into war. But once it was clear that the United States had the upper hand on the battlefield, the possibility of an Anglo-American war vanished.

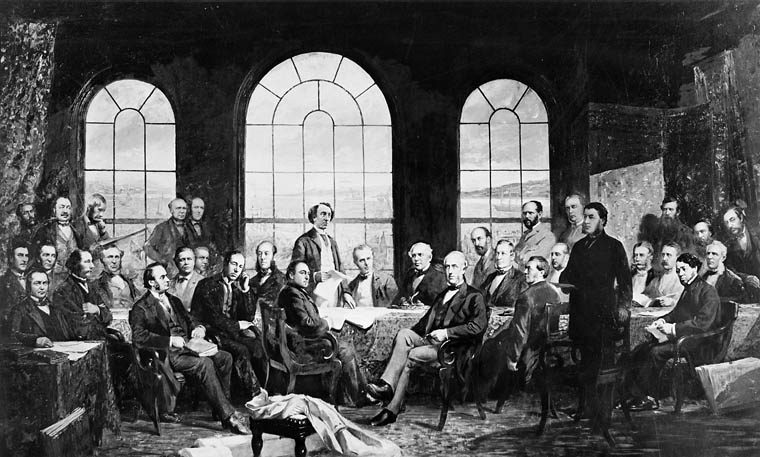
Fathers of Canadian Confederation by Robert Harris (1885).

Her diary entries suggest the Queen had contemplated the possibility of a union of her North American colonies as early as February 1865. She wrote, "...we must struggle for it, and far the best it would be to let it go as an Independent Kingdom, under an English Prince!" She also mentioned how her late husband Prince Albert had hoped that one day, their sons would rule over the British colonies. In February 1867, the Queen received a copy of the British North America Act (also known as the Constitution Act 1867). A fortnight later she hosted delegates coming to discuss the question of confederation "under the name of Canada," including the future Prime Minister John A. Macdonald. On 29 March 1867, the Queen granted royal assent to the Act, which became effective on 1 July 1867.

Canada maintained strong ties with the Queen. Victoria in British Columbia and Victoria County in Nova Scotia were named after her, Regina in Saskatchewan in her honour, Prince Edward Island her father, and Alberta her daughter. Her birthday, Victoria Day, is an official public holiday in Canada. In addition, her daughter Princess Louise was chatelaine of Rideau Hall from 1878 to 1883 and her son the Duke of Connaught served as Governor-General of Canada between 1911 and 1916.

In 1867, the second Reform Act was passed, expanding the franchise.

== Late period ==
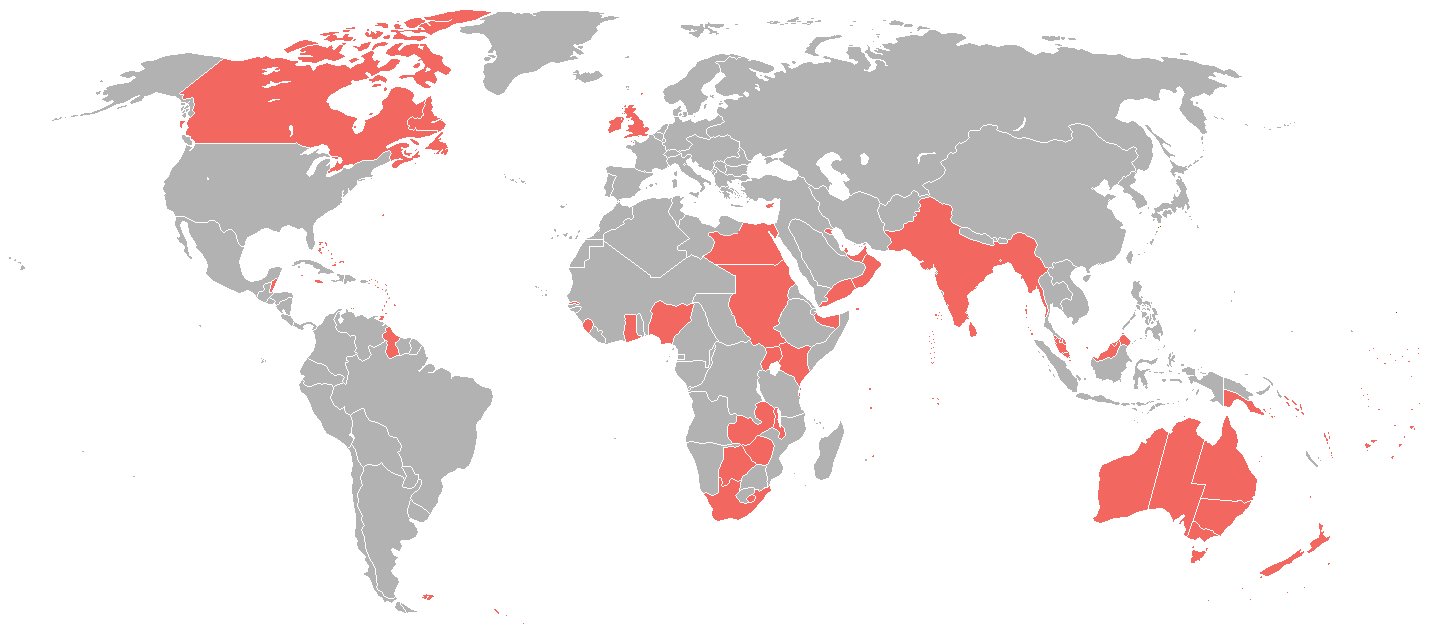
Map of the British Empire in 1898

Key leaders included Conservatives Benjamin Disraeli, and Robert Gascoyne-Cecil, 3rd Marquess of Salisbury, and Liberals William Ewart Gladstone, the Earl of Rosebery and William Harcourt. They introduced various reforms aimed at strengthening the political autonomy of large industrial cities and increasing British involvement in the international stage. Labour movements were recognised and integrated in order to combat extremism. The Fabian Society is founded in London by a group of left-leaning middle-class intellectuals, including Quaker Edward R. Pease, Havelock Ellis and E. Nesbit, to promote socialism. Both Queen Victoria and Prince Albert favoured moderate improvements to conditions of workers. Queen Victoria found in Disraeli a trustworthy adviser. She approved of his policies which helped elevated Britain's status to global superpower. In her later years, her popularity soared as she became a symbol of the British Empire. The major new policies included rapid succession, the complete abolition of slavery in the African possessions, the end of transportation of convicts to Australia, loosening restrictions on colonial trade, and introducing responsible government.

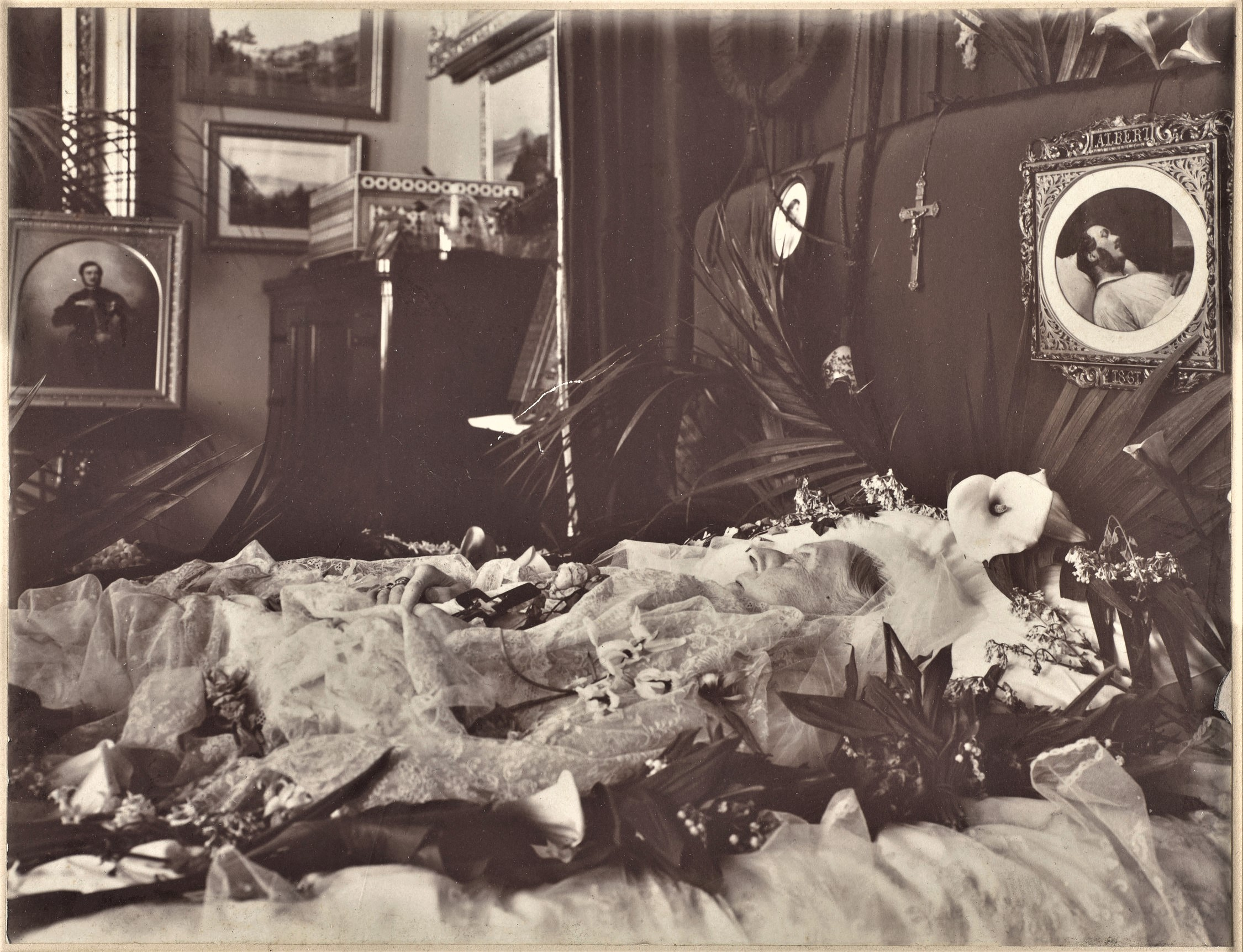
Queen Victoria on her deathbed, 1901

David Livingstone led famous expeditions in central Africa, positioning Britain for favourable expansion of its colonial system in the Scramble for Africa during the 1880s. There were numerous revolts and violent conflicts in the British Empire, but there were no wars with other major nations. In South Africa tensions escalated, especially with the discovery of gold. The result was the First Boer War in 1880–1881 and the intensely bitter Second Boer War in 1899–1902. The British finally prevailed, but lost prestige at home and abroad. The first conflict is sometimes described as marking the beginning of the decline of the British Empire.

After weeks of illness, Queen Victoria died on 22 January 1901. By her bedside were her son and heir Edward VII and grandson Kaiser Wilhelm II. Despite their difficult relations, Edward VII never severed ties with the Queen. Like her, he modernised the British monarchy and ensured its survival when so many European royal families collapsed as a result of the First World War.

== See also ==
- Economy, industry, and trade of the Victorian era
- Society and culture of the Victorian era
- Victorian era
