= Domestic tourism =

Travel for pleasure or business within one's country

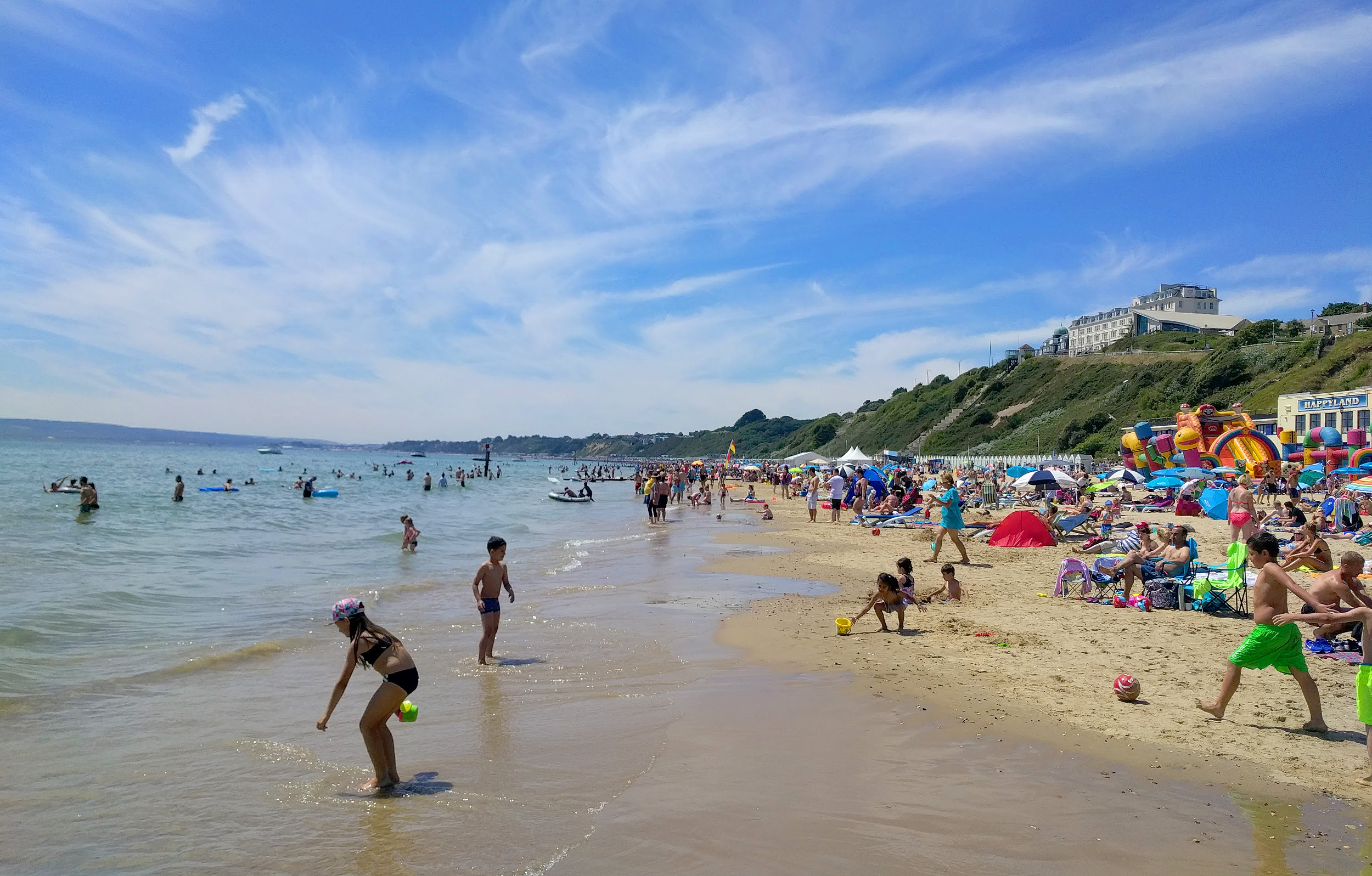
Tourists on the beach in Bournemouth, England

Domestic tourism is tourism involving residents of one country traveling only within that country. Such a vacation is known as a domestic vacation (British: domestic holiday or holiday at home). For large countries, such as Russia, Brazil, Canada, Australia, the United States, China, and India, domestic tourism plays a very large role in the total tourism sector.

During the COVID-19 pandemic, domestic tourism increased significantly, as countries closed their airports to minimize the spread of COVID-19. Jobs and businesses were lost as a result of the general decline of tourism.

In British English this may also be called a staycation, a portmanteau of "stay" and "vacation", although this is not to be confused the concept of a vacation in which one stays overnight at their own home. The use of the term "staycation" to refer to a domestic holiday was popularized in the late 2000s by its use in the British media in their reporting of the increase in such tourism during the Great Recession when the weakness in the pound made travel abroad more expensive.

== See also ==
- Day trip
- Staycation
- Tourism
