= Staycation =

Vacation taken within one's own home or territory

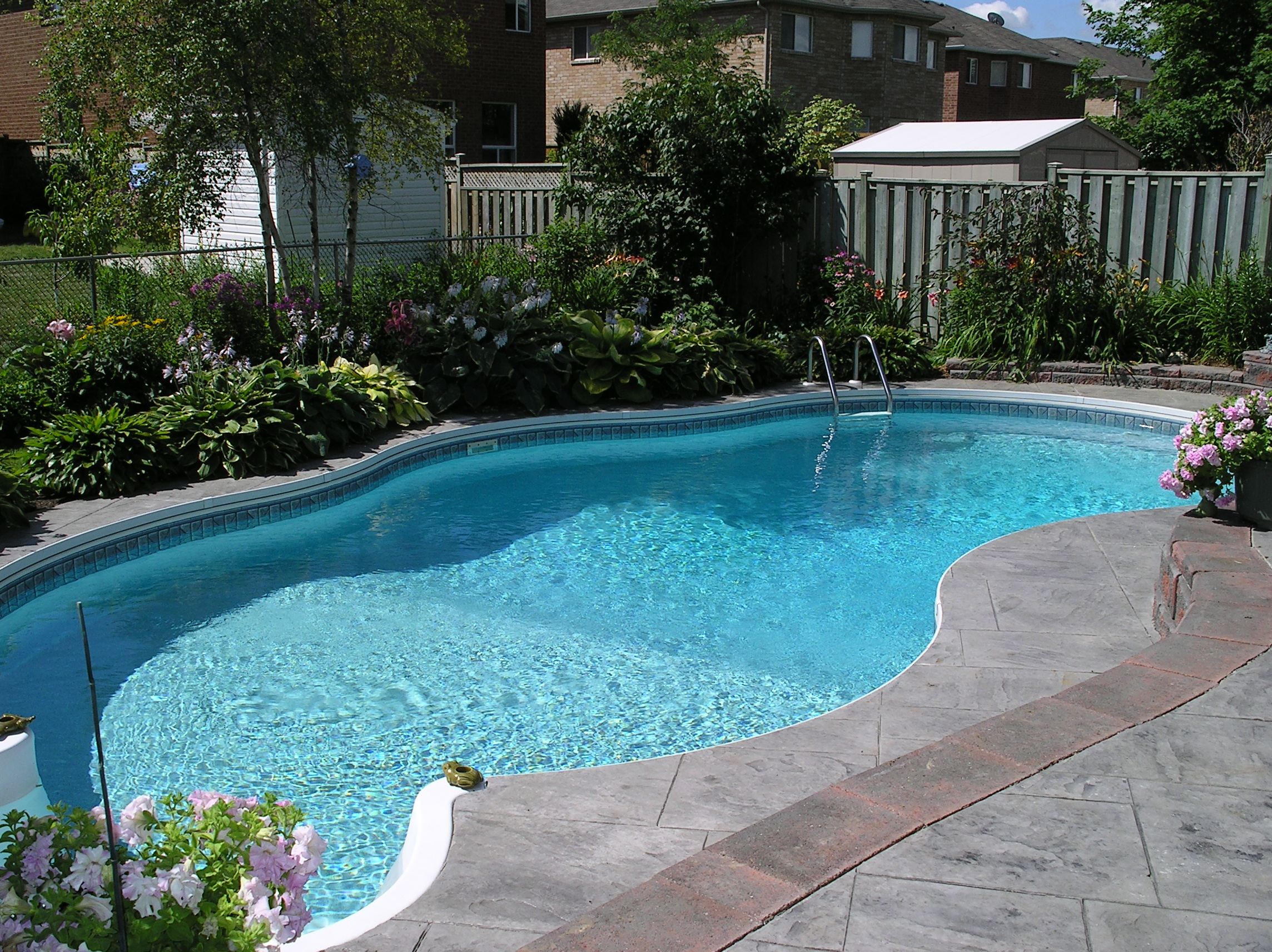
Relaxing in a home swimming pool is a typical staycation pursuit.

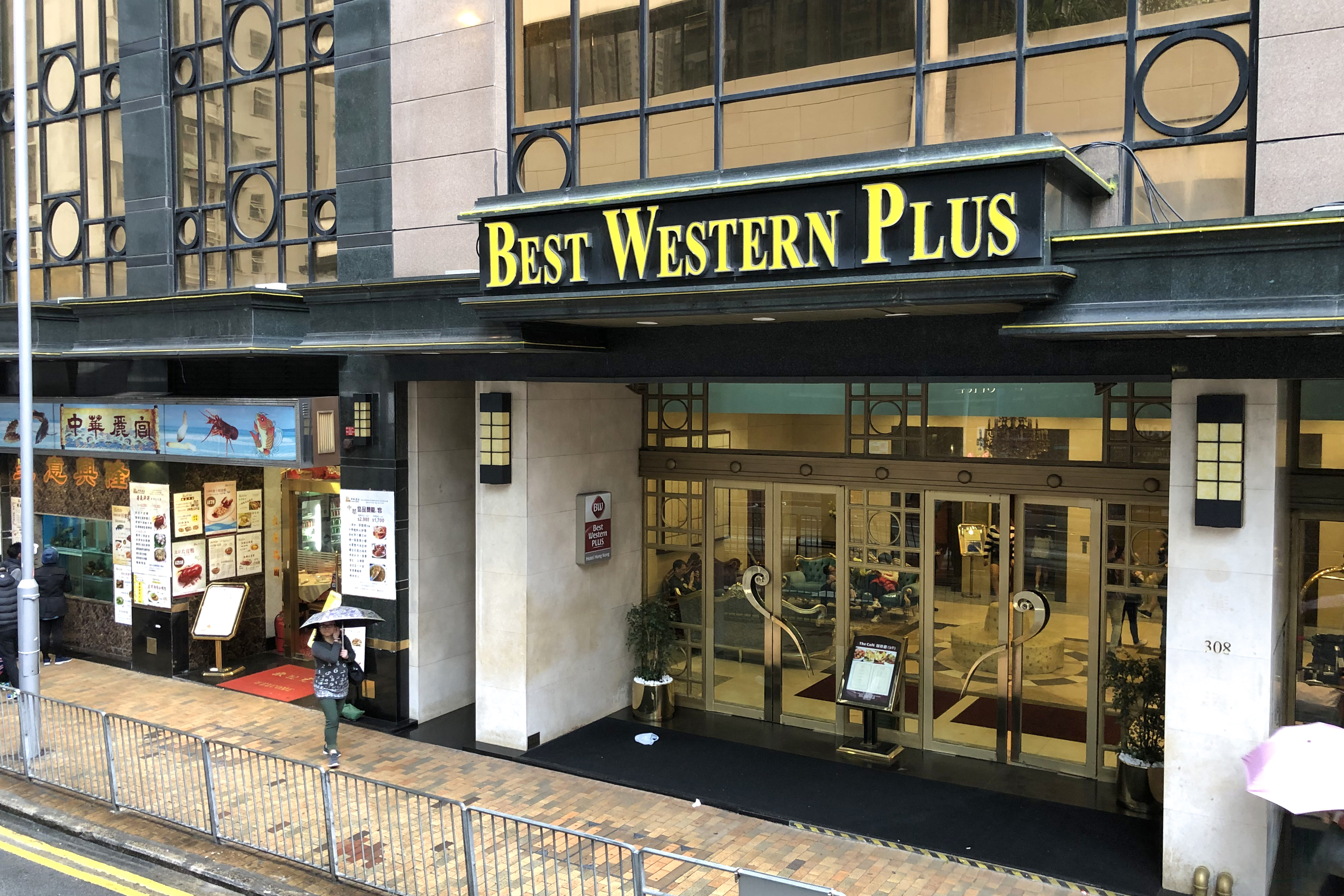
In Hong Kong, the term may refer to a domestic tourism vacation at a hotel or accommodation elsewhere in the territory.

A staycation (a portmanteau of "stay" and "vacation") is a recreational break spent at home or within a both-ways day's trip distance of it, requiring no overnight accommodation. In the UK, Ireland and Hong Kong, the term has increasingly come to encompass domestic tourism, or taking a holiday in one's resident country or territory as opposed to traveling abroad. In Hong Kong, the term has also come to mean a vacation spent staying in a nearby hotel or accommodation.

Common activities of a staycation include the use of a home pool, visits to local parks and museums, and attendance at local festivals and amusement parks. Some staycationers also like to follow a set of rules, such as setting a start and end date, planning ahead, and avoiding routine, with the goal of creating the feel of a traditional vacation.

Staycations achieved popularity in the U.S. during the Great Recession of the late 2000s. In 2020, they became common because of the COVID-19 pandemic.

== Etymology ==
The word staycation is a portmanteau of stay (meaning stay-at-home) and vacation. The term daycation is also sometimes used. Merriam-Webster cites the earliest use in the 18 July 1944 Cincinnati Enquirer. The term was used by Canadian comedian Brent Butt in the television show Corner Gas, in the episode "Mail Fraud", which first aired 24 October 2005. The word became widely used in the United States during 2008, when gas prices reached record highs, leading many people to cut back on expenses including travel. The term was added to the 2009 version of Merriam-Webster's Collegiate Dictionary. However, Lake Superior State University added the word to its 2009 List of Banished Words. The citation noted that vacation is not synonymous with travel, and thus a separate term is not necessary to describe a vacation during which one stays at home.

== Benefits ==
Staycations are likely to be less costly than a vacation involving distant traveling. There may be no lodging costs, and travel expenses may be minimal. Costs may include transportation for local trips, dining, and local attractions. According to the American Automobile Association, "the average North American vacation will cost $244 per day for two people for lodging and meals" and "Add some kids and airfare, and a 10-day vacation could top $8,000."

Staycations are likely to avoid some of the stress associated with travel, such as jet lag, packing, long drives, or waits at airports.

Staycations may also be of economic benefit to some local businesses, who get customers only from the area providing them with business. In 2008, the tourism bureaus of many U.S. cities also began promoting staycations for their residents to help replace the tourism dollars lost from a drop in out-of-town visitors.

== Risks ==
Staycationers may spend money they had not planned as retailers and other advertisers offer "deals". Staycationers can also finish a stay-at-home vacation feeling unsatisfied if they allow themselves to fall into their daily monotony and include household projects, errands, and other tasks in their vacation at home or near home.

== See also ==
- Day trip
- Domestic tourism
- Tourism
