= Tourism =

Travel for recreational or leisure purposes

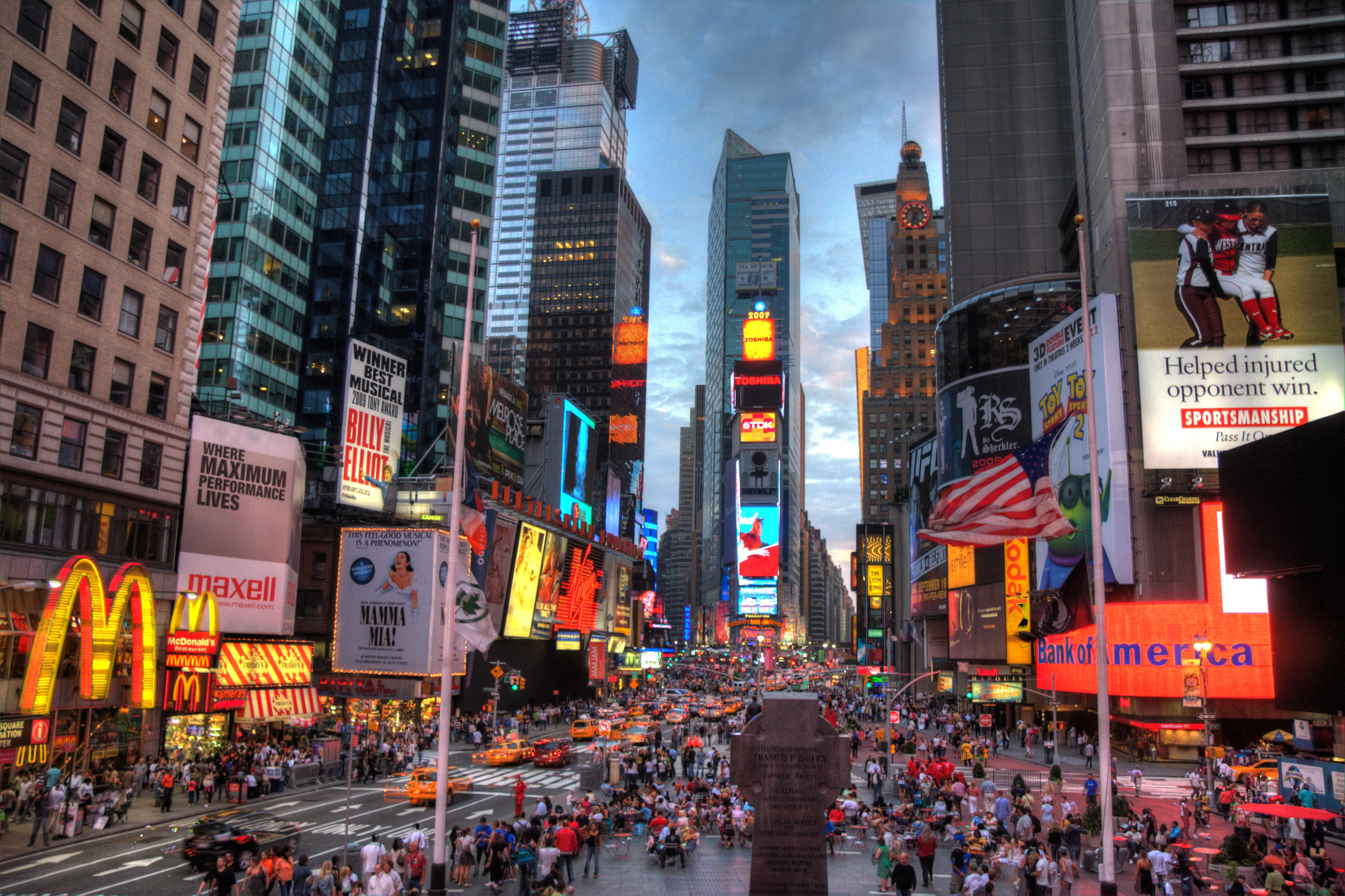
Times Square in New York City

Tourism is travel for pleasure, and the commercial activity of providing and supporting such travel. UN Tourism defines tourism more generally as people "staying in places outside their usual environment for not more than one consecutive year for leisure and not less than 24 hours, business and other purposes". Tourism can be domestic or international. Global tourism has both incoming and outgoing implications on a country's balance of payments.

Between the second half of 2008 and the end of 2009, tourism numbers declined as a result of the Great Recession and the outbreak of the 2009 H1N1 influenza virus. These numbers, however, recovered until the COVID-19 pandemic put an abrupt end to the growth. The United Nations World Tourism Organization has estimated that global international tourist arrivals might have decreased by 58% to 78% in 2020, leading to a potential loss of US$0.9–1.2 trillion in international tourism receipts.

Globally, international tourism receipts (the travel item in the balance of payments) grew to US$1.03 trillion (€740 billion) in 2005, corresponding to an increase in real terms of 3.8% from 2010. International tourist arrivals surpassed the milestone of 1 billion tourists globally for the first time in 2012. Emerging source markets such as China, Russia, and Brazil have significantly increased their spending over the previous decade.

Global tourism accounts for approx. 8% of global greenhouse-gas emissions. Emissions as well as other significant environmental and social impacts are not always beneficial to local communities and their economies. Many tourist development organizations are shifting focus to sustainable tourism to minimize the negative effects of growing tourism. This approach aims to balance economic benefits with environmental and social responsibility. The United Nations World Tourism Organization emphasized these practices by promoting tourism as part of the Sustainable Development Goals, through programs such as the International Year for Sustainable Tourism for Development in 2017.

In 2025, Italy was the most visited country in the world, with approximately 88 million international tourist arrivals, followed by Spain (80 million), the United States (68 million), and France (59 million).

== Etymology ==
The English language word tourist was used in 1772 and tourism in 1811. These words derive from the word tour, which comes from Old English turian, from Old French torner, from Latin tornare, "to turn on a lathe", which is itself from Ancient Greek tornos (τόρνος), "lathe".

== Definitions ==
In 1936, the League of Nations defined a foreign tourist as "someone traveling abroad for at least twenty-four hours". Its successor, the United Nations, amended this definition in 1945, by including a maximum stay of six months.

F.W. Ogilvie formulated one of the earliest social science definitions of "tourist" in the 1930s, defining the term as "any person whose movements fulfill two conditions: first, that absence from home is relatively short, and second, that money spent during absence is money derived from home and not in the place visited." In 1941, Hunziker and Kraft defined tourism as "the sum of the phenomena and relationships arising from the travel and stay of non-residents, insofar as they do not lead to permanent residence and are not connected with any earning activity." In 1976, the Tourism Society of England's definition was: "Tourism is the temporary, short-term movement of people to destinations outside the places where they normally live and work and their activities during the stay at each destination. It includes movements for all purposes." In 1981, the International Association of Scientific Experts in Tourism defined tourism in terms of particular activities chosen and undertaken outside the home.

In 1994, the United Nations identified three forms of tourism in its Recommendations on Tourism Statistics:

- Domestic tourism, involving residents of the given country traveling only within this country
- Inbound tourism, involving non-residents traveling into the given country
- Outbound tourism, involving residents traveling to another country

Other groupings derived from the above grouping:

- National tourism, a combination of domestic and outbound tourism
- Regional tourism, a combination of domestic and inbound tourism
- International tourism, a combination of inbound and outbound tourism

The terms tourism and travel are sometimes used interchangeably. In this context, travel has a similar definition to tourism but implies a more purposeful journey. The terms tourism and tourist are sometimes used pejoratively, to imply a shallow interest in the cultures or locations visited. By contrast, traveler is often used as a sign of distinction. The sociology of tourism has studied the cultural values underpinning these distinctions and their implications for class relations.

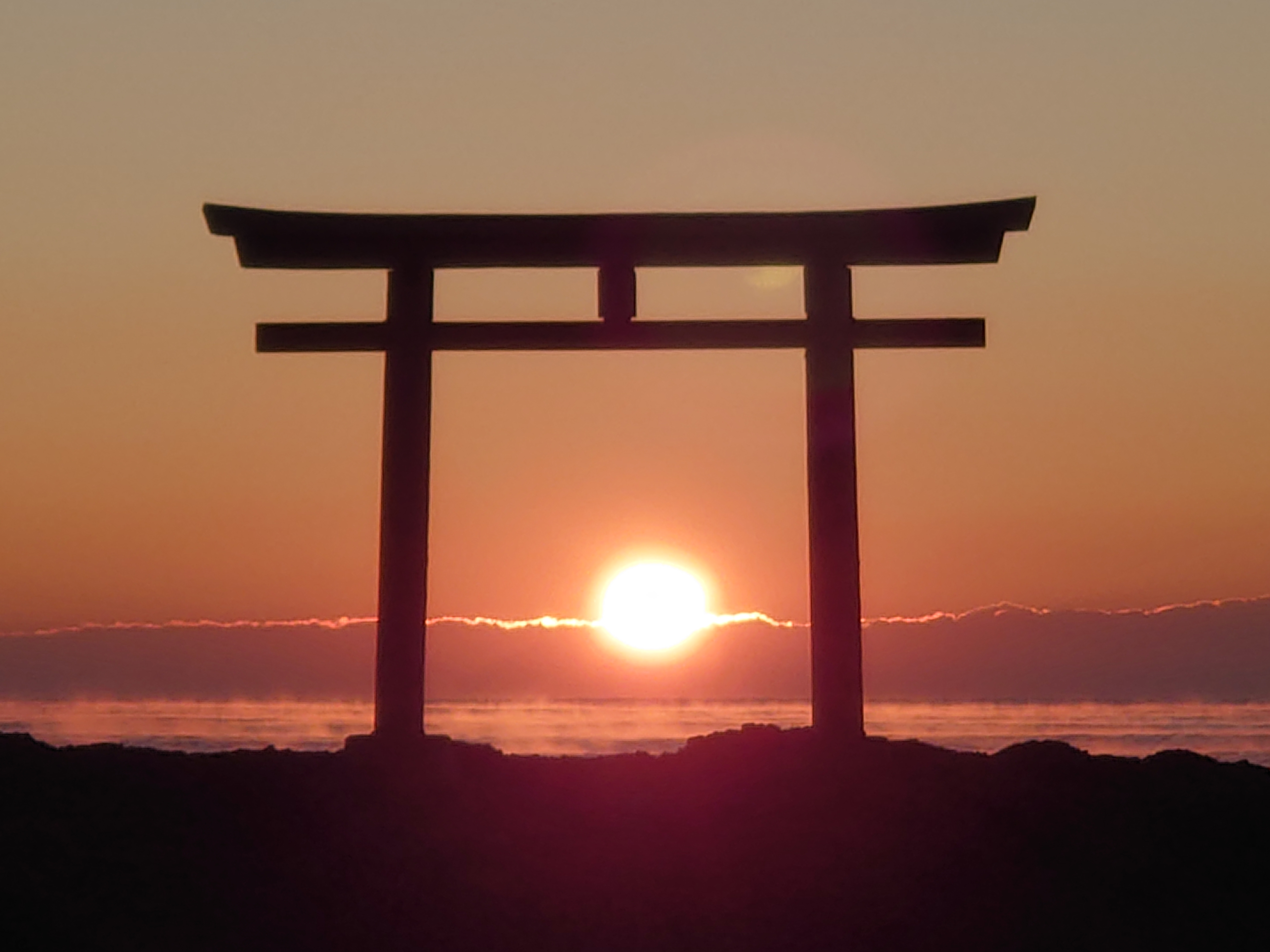
The first sunrise seen from the torii gate on the sea, which is considered a sacred place (Ōarai in Japan)

=== Tourism products ===
According to the World Tourism Organization, a tourism product is:

"a combination of tangible and intangible elements, such as natural, cultural, and manmade resources, attractions, facilities, services and activities around a specific center of interest which represents the core of the destination marketing mix and creates an overall visitor experience including emotional aspects for the potential customers. A tourism product is priced and sold through distribution channels and it has a life cycle."

A tourist map shows the functional zones of a city. Tourism products cover a wide variety of services including:

- Accommodation services from budget homestays to luxury hotels
- Hospitality services including food and beverage serving centers
- Healthcare services like massages
- All modes of transit, booking and rental
- Travel agencies, guided tours and tourist guides
- Cultural services such as religious monuments, museums, and historical places
- Shopping
- Additional travel services like airport parking, airport hotels and travel insurance

=== International tourism ===
International tourist arrivals per year by region

International tourism is tourism that crosses national borders. Globalization has made tourism a popular global leisure activity. The World Tourism Organization defines tourists as people "traveling to and staying in places outside their usual environment for not more than one consecutive year for leisure, business and other purposes". The World Health Organization (WHO) estimates that up to 500,000 people are in flight at any one time.

In 2010, international tourism reached US$919B, growing 6.5% over 2009, corresponding to an increase in real terms of 4.7%. In 2010, there were over 940 million international tourist arrivals worldwide. By 2016 that number had risen to 1,235 million, producing US$1.22 trillion in destination spending. The COVID-19 crisis had significant negative effects on international tourism significantly slowing the overall increasing trend.

In 2025, an estimated 1.52 billion international tourist arrivals were recorded worldwide, an increase of almost 60 million from 2024.

International tourism has significant impacts on the environment, exacerbated in part by the problems created by air travel but also by other issues, including wealthy tourists bringing lifestyles that stress local infrastructure, water and trash systems, among others.

== Basis ==
Tourism typically requires the tourist to feel engaged in a genuine experience of the location they are visiting. According to Dean MacCannell, tourism requires that the tourist can view the toured area as both authentic and different from their own lived experience. By viewing the "exotic," tourists learn what they themselves are not: that is, they are "un-exotic," or normal.

According to MacCannell, all modern tourism experiences the "authentic" and "exotic" as "developmentally inferior" to the modern—that is, to the lived experience of the tourist.

Cultural and natural heritage is, in many cases, the basis for worldwide tourism. Cultural tourism is one of the megatrends that is reflected in massive numbers of overnight stays and sales. According to UNESCO, cultural heritage is needed for tourism, but also endangered by it. The "ICOMOS - International Cultural Tourism Charter" from 1999 deals with such problems. As a result of the tourist hazard, for example, the Lascaux cave was rebuilt for tourists. Furthermore, the focus of UNESCO in war zones is to ensure the protection of cultural heritage in order to maintain this future important economic basis for the local population. There is intensive cooperation between UNESCO, the United Nations, United Nations peacekeeping and Blue Shield International. There are extensive international and national considerations, studies and programs to protect cultural assets from the effects of tourism and those from war. In particular, it is also about training civilian and military personnel. But the involvement of the locals is particularly important. The founding president of Blue Shield International Karl von Habsburg summed it up with the words: "Without the local community and without the local participants, that would be completely impossible'.

== History ==
=== Ancient ===
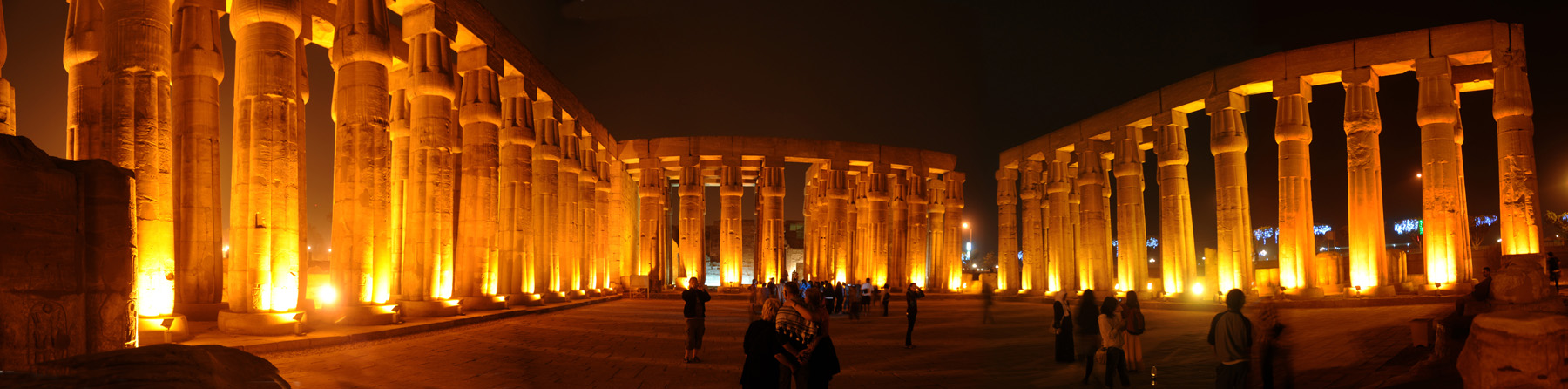
A panoramic view of the interior of the Luxor temple, Luxor, Egypt.

Travel outside a person's local area for leisure was largely confined to wealthy classes, who at times traveled to distant parts of the world to see great buildings and works of art, learn new languages, experience new cultures, enjoy pristine nature and to taste different cuisines. Kings as early as Shulgi praised themselves for protecting roads and building way stations for travelers. Traveling for pleasure can be seen in Egypt as early on as 1500 BC. Ancient Roman tourists during the Republic would visit spas and coastal resorts, such as Baiae. The Roman upper class used to spend their free time on land or at sea and traveled to their villa urbana or villa maritima. Numerous villas were located in Campania, around Rome and in the northern part of the Adriatic as in Barcola near Trieste. In ancient China, nobles sometimes made a point of visiting Mount Tai and, on occasion, all five Sacred Mountains.

=== Medieval ===
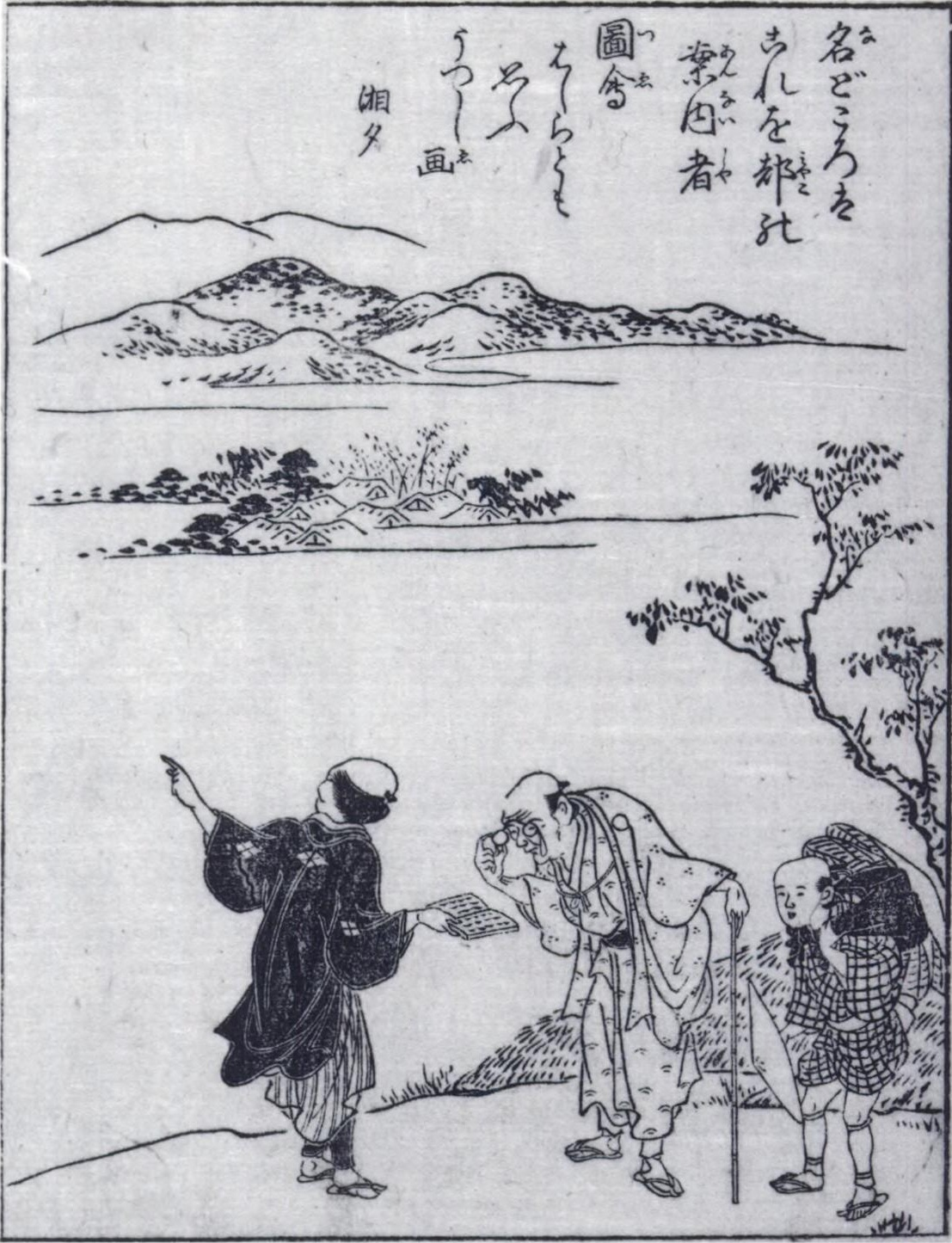
A Japanese tourist consulting a tour guide and a guide book from Akizato Ritō's Miyako meisho zue (1787)

By the post-classical era, many religions, including Christianity, Buddhism, and Islam had developed traditions of pilgrimage. The Canterbury Tales (c. 1390s), which uses a pilgrimage as a framing device, remains a classic of English literature, and Journey to the West (c. 1592), which holds a seminal place in Chinese literature, has a Buddhist pilgrimage at the center of its narrative.

In Medieval Italy, Petrarch wrote an allegorical account of his 1336 ascent of Mont Ventoux that praised the act of traveling and criticized frigida incuriositas (a 'cold lack of curiosity'); this account is regarded as one of the first known instances of travel being undertaken for its own sake. The Burgundian poet Michault Taillevent later composed his own horrified recollections of a 1430 trip through the Jura Mountains.

In China, travel record literature (遊記文學; yóujì wénxué) became popular during the Song Dynasty (960–1279). Travel writers such as Fan Chengda (1126–1193) and Xu Xiake (1587–1641) incorporated a wealth of geographical and topographical information into their writing, while the Record of Stone Bell Mountain by noted poet and statesman Su Shi (1037–1101) presented a philosophical and moral argument as its central purpose.

=== Grand Tour ===
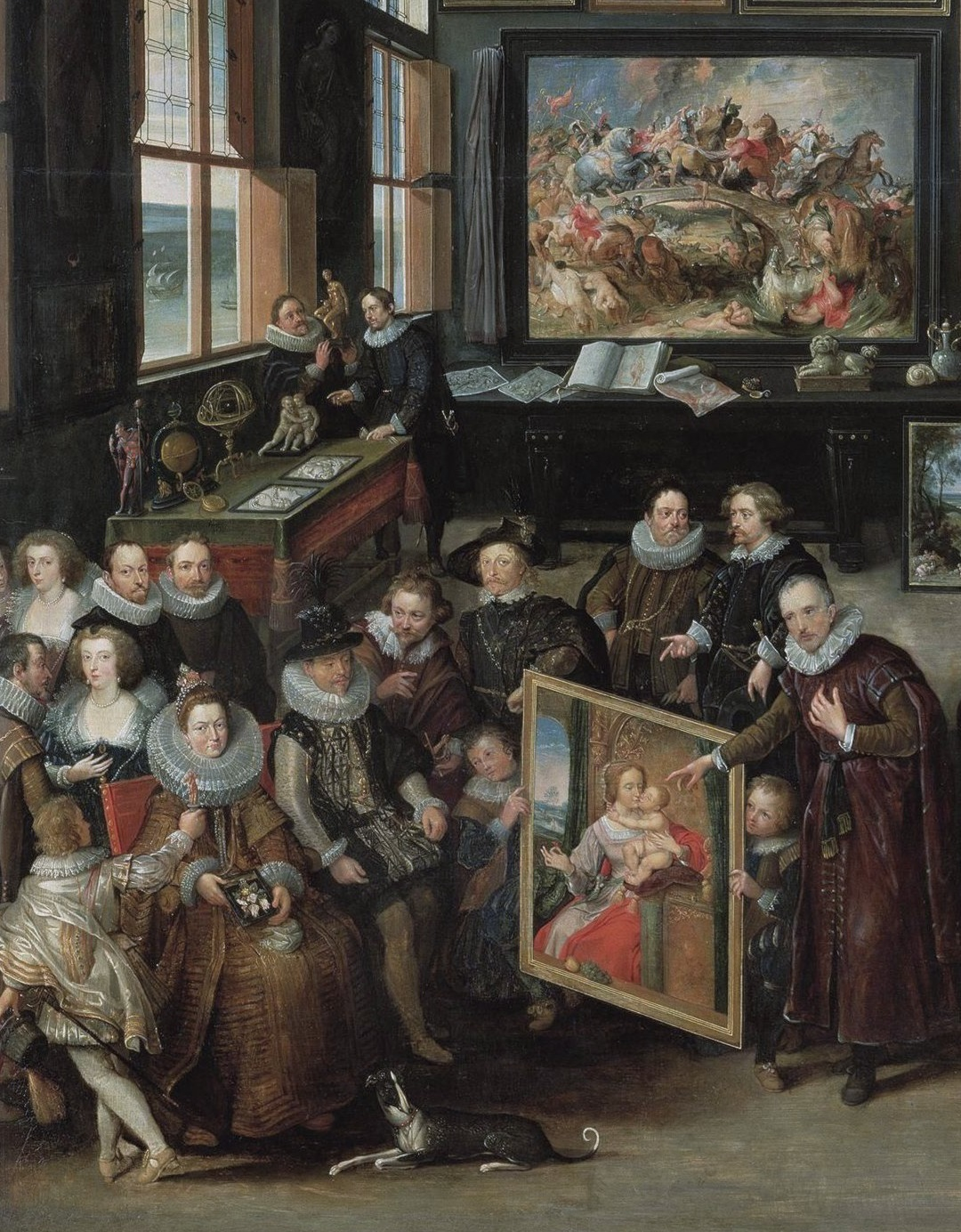
Prince Ladislaus Sigismund of Poland visiting Gallery of Cornelis van der Geest in Brussels in 1624

Modern tourism can be traced to what was known as the Grand Tour, which was a traditional trip around Europe (especially Germany and Italy), undertaken by mainly European young men of means, mainly from Western and Northern European countries. In 1624, the young Prince of Poland, Ladislaus Sigismund Vasa, the eldest son of Sigismund III, embarked on a journey across Europe, as was in custom among Polish nobility. He traveled through territories of today's Germany, Belgium, the Netherlands, where he admired the siege of Breda by Spanish forces, France, Switzerland to Italy, Austria, and the Czech Republic. It was an educational journey and one of the outcomes was introduction of Italian opera in the Polish–Lithuanian Commonwealth.

The custom flourished from about 1660 until the advent of large-scale rail transit in the 1840s and generally followed a standard itinerary. It was an educational opportunity and rite of passage. Though primarily associated with the British nobility and wealthy landed gentry, similar trips were made by wealthy young men of Protestant Northern European nations on the Continent, and from the second half of the 18th century some South American, US, and other overseas youth joined in. The tradition was extended to include more of the middle class after rail and steamship travel made the journey easier, and Thomas Cook made the "Cook's Tour" a byword.

The Grand Tour became a status symbol for upper-class students in the 18th and 19th centuries. In this period, Johann Joachim Winckelmann's theories about the supremacy of classic culture became very popular and appreciated in the European academic world. Artists, writers, and travelers, such as Goethe, affirmed the supremacy of classic art of which Italy, France, and Greece provide excellent examples. For these reasons, the Grand Tour's main destinations were to those centers, where upper-class students could find rare examples of classic art and history.

In 2008, The New York Times described the Grand Tour in this way:

Three hundred years ago, wealthy young Englishmen began taking a post-Oxbridge trek through France and Italy in search of art, culture and the roots of Western civilization. With nearly unlimited funds, aristocratic connections and months (or years) to roam, they commissioned paintings, perfected their language skills and mingled with the upper crust of the Continent.

— Gross, Matt., Lessons From the Frugal Grand Tour." New York Times, 5 September 2008.

The primary value of the Grand Tour, it was believed, laid in the exposure both to the cultural legacy of classical antiquity and the Renaissance, and to the aristocratic and fashionably polite society of the European continent.

=== Emergence of leisure travel ===
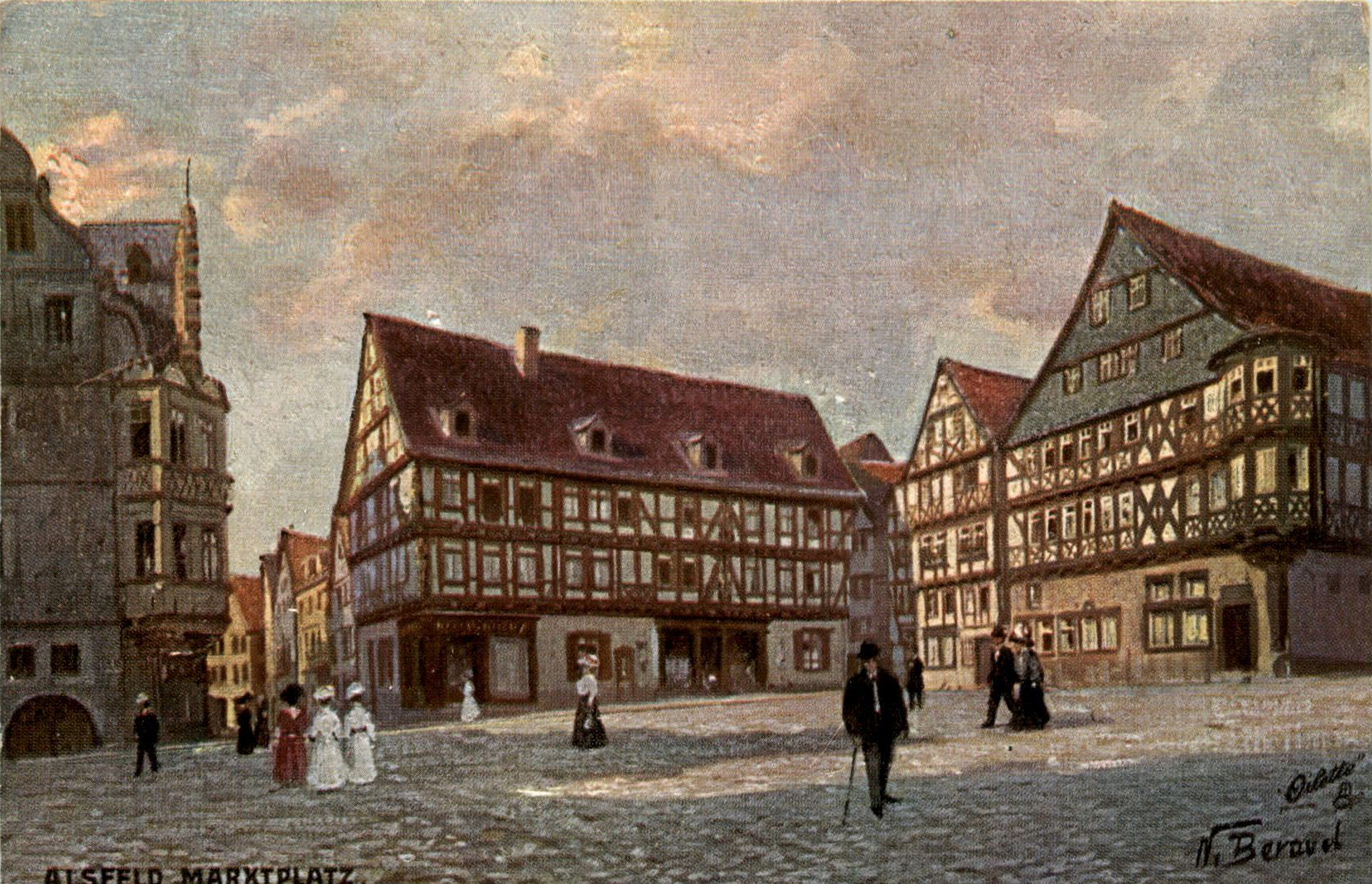
English postcard of the old town of Alsfeld in Germany, with tourists on the market square

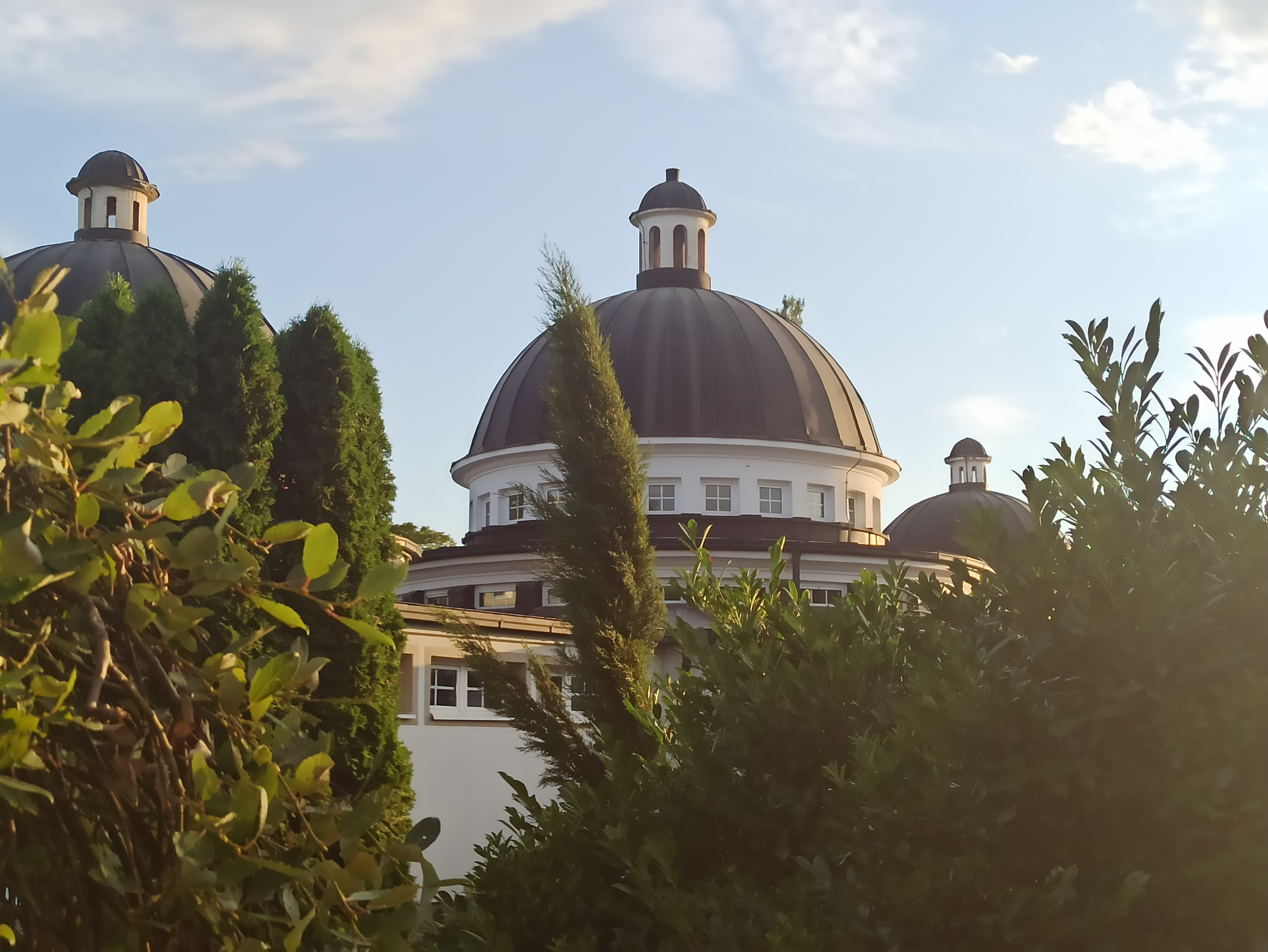
The Slatina Spa in Slatina, Bosnia and Herzegovina, is famous for its characteristics and had attracted tourists since 1870s.

Leisure travel was associated with the Industrial Revolution in the United Kingdom – the first European country to promote leisure time to the increasing industrial population. Initially, this applied to the owners of the machinery of production, the economic oligarchy, factory owners and traders. These comprised the new middle class. Cox & Kings was the first official travel company to be formed in 1758.

The British origin of this new industry is reflected in many place names. In Nice, France, one of the oldest and foremost resorts on the French Riviera, the long esplanade along the seafront is known to this day as the Promenade des Anglais; in many other historic resorts in continental Europe, old, well-established palace hotels have names like the Hotel Bristol, Hotel Carlton, or Hotel Majestic – reflecting the dominance of English customers.

In Continental Europe, early seaside resorts included Heiligendamm, founded in 1793 at the Baltic Sea, being the first seaside resort; Ostend, popularized by people from Brussels; Boulogne-sur-Mer and Deauville for the Parisians; Taormina in Sicily. In the United States, the first European style seaside resorts were at Atlantic City, New Jersey and Long Island, New York.

A pioneer of the travel agency business, Thomas Cook's idea to offer excursions came to him while waiting for the stagecoach on the London Road at Kibworth. With the opening of the extended Midland Counties Railway, he arranged to take a group of 540 temperance campaigners from Leicester Campbell Street station to a rally in Loughborough, eleven miles (18 km) away. On 5 July 1841, Thomas Cook arranged for the rail company to charge one shilling per person; this included rail tickets and food for the journey. Cook was paid a share of the fares charged to the passengers, as the tickets, being legal contracts between company and passenger, could not have been issued at his own price. This was the first privately chartered excursion train to be advertised to the general public; Cook himself acknowledged that there had been previous, unadvertised, private excursion trains. During the following three summers he planned and conducted outings for temperance societies and Sunday school children. In 1844, the Midland Counties Railway Company agreed to make a permanent arrangement with him, provided he found the passengers. This success led him to start his own business running rail excursions for pleasure, taking a percentage of its fares.

In 1855, he planned his first excursion abroad, when he took a group from Leicester to Calais to coincide with the Paris Exhibition. The following year he started his "grand circular tours" of Europe. During the 1860s he took parties to Switzerland, Italy, Egypt, and the United States. Cook established "inclusive independent travel", whereby the traveler went independently but his agency charged for travel, food, and accommodation for a fixed period over any chosen route. Such was his success that Scottish rail companies withdrew their support between 1862 and 1863 to try the excursion business for themselves.

=== Tourism and colonialism ===
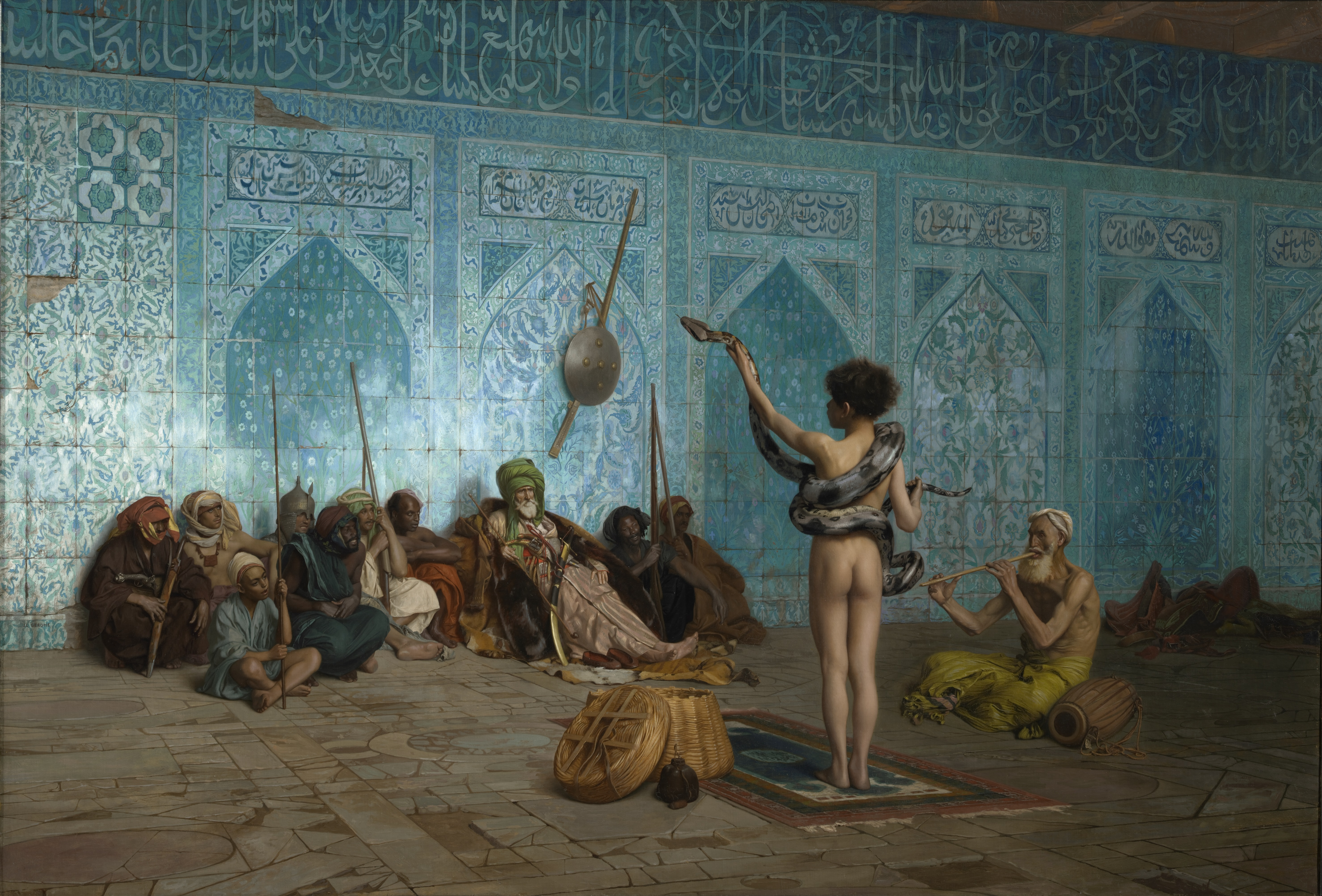
Le charmeur de serpents by Jean-Léon Gérôme (c. 1879).

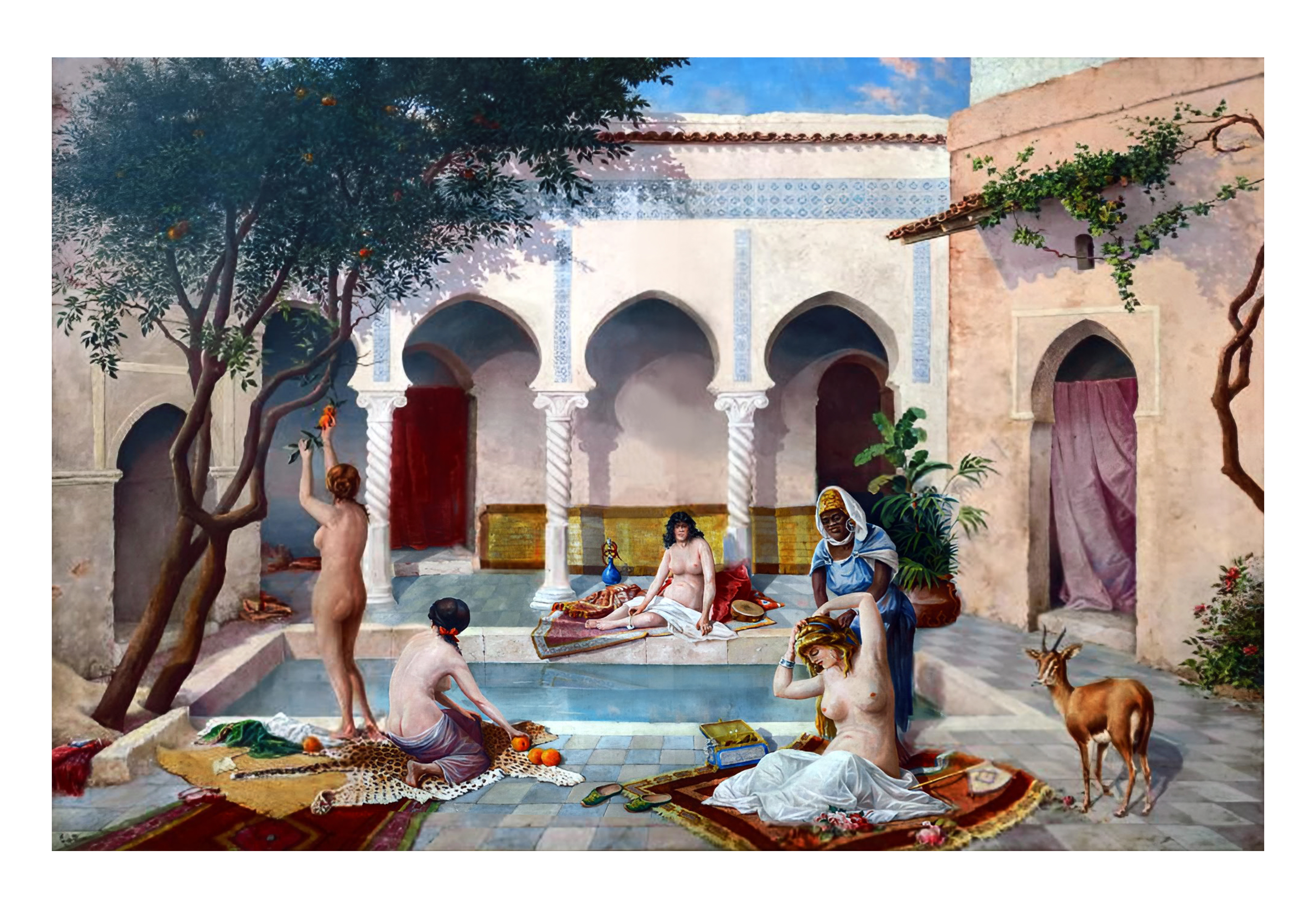
La Toilette au Harem by Gaspard de Toursky, 20th century.

Although tourism is more often associated with cultural appreciation and leisure, it is also directly connected with power dynamics, cultural representations, and conflicts. Tourism developed alongside violent colonial domination in many regions of the world. Colonial authorities often developed transportation infrastructure that facilitated the growth of tourism, while simultaneously promoting racialized and demeaning representations of native populations.

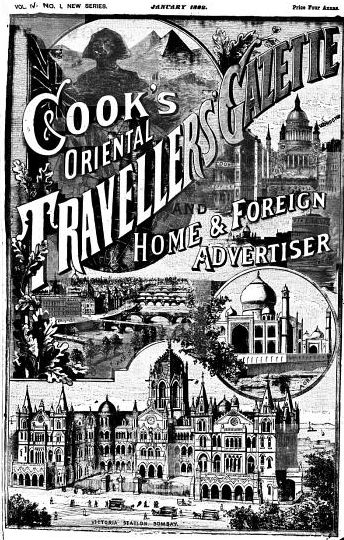
Cook's Gazette, 1892.

In the 19th century, in order to foster the development of tourism in the colonies, touristic enterprises used tourist media to present them as attractive destinations for European travelers. Consequently, tourism media not only promoted the colonies as touristic destinations and helped shape popular conceptions about them, but also helped consolidate ideas of Western cultural superiority. One notable example is Thomas Cook's travel enterprise established in the United Kingdom in 1841 and his travel newspaper called “The Excursionist”. The Thomas Cook enterprise promoted touristic excursions and package tours all over the world. In the case of the tour to Egypt, Thomas Cook & Son’s promotional materials aimed to portray it as an “out-of-the-ordinary”, wild, yet safe and domesticated destination, appealing to European tourists’ desire for both familiarity and adventure. Thomas Cook & Son collaboration with the British Empire during the occupation of Egypt facilitated European access to the Middle East through the construction of transportation networks such as steamships on the Nile. At the same time, it reinforced Eurocentric and imperial politics.

=== Tourism after 1945 ===
In the period following World War II, an increasing number of individuals from diverse backgrounds were able to participate in tourism.

==== Racial segregation and tourism in the United States ====
Prior to the Civil Rights Act, Black motorists encountered specific challenges when traveling domestically. Jim Crow legislation enforced racial segregation in numerous public spaces, including public transportation, accommodation, and tourist sites in general.

The Negro Motorist Green Book was a travel guide published from 1936 to 1967 by Victor and Alma Duke Green. It was aimed at Black motorists in the United States during the era of segregation and listed places where Black motorists were welcome. Several major companies collaborated with the Green Book. For instance, the Esso Standard Oil Company placed advertisements in the Green Book and sold it at their nationwide gas stations.

=== Recent developments ===
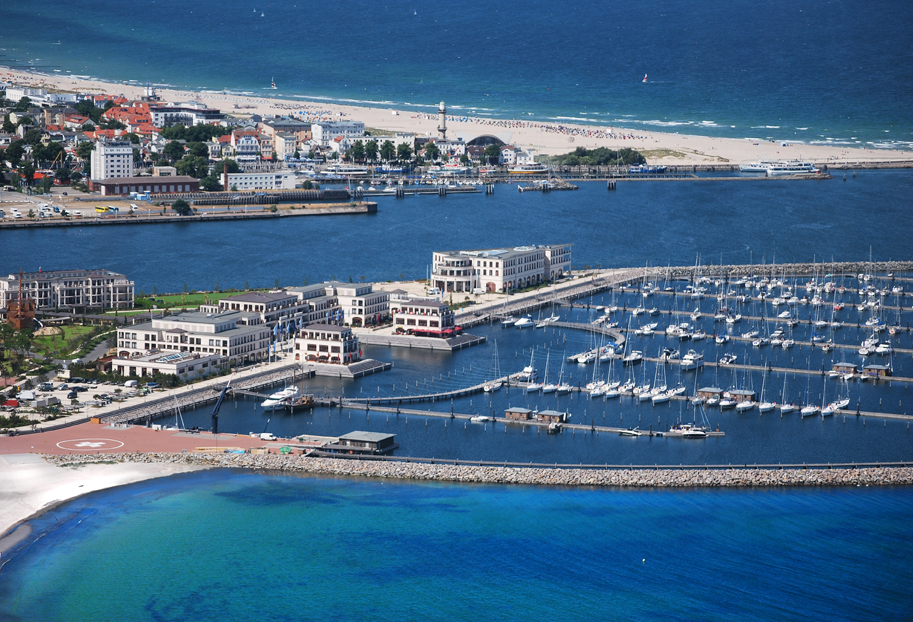
A destination hotel in Germany: Yacht Harbor Residence in Rostock, Mecklenburg

There has been an uptrend in tourism over the last few decades, especially in Europe, where international travel for short breaks is common. Tourists have a wide range of budgets and tastes, and a wide variety of resorts and hotels have developed to cater for them. For example, some people prefer simple beach vacations, while others want more specialized holidays, quieter resorts, family-oriented holidays, or niche market-targeted destination hotels.

Developments in aviation infrastructure, such as jumbo jets, low-cost airlines, and more accessible airports have made many types of tourism more affordable. A major factor in the relatively low cost of air travel is the tax exemption for aviation fuels. The WHO estimated in 2009 that there are around half a million people on board aircraft at any given time. There have also been changes in lifestyle, for example, some retirement-age people sustain year-round tourism. A crucial development has been the growth of internet sales of tourist services and the availability of customer reviews. Some sites have now started to offer dynamic packaging, in which an inclusive price is quoted for a tailor-made package requested by the customer upon impulse.

There have been a few setbacks in tourism, such as the September 11 attacks and terrorist threats to tourist destinations in Bali and several European cities. On 26 December 2004, a tsunami caused by the 2004 Indian Ocean earthquake hit Asian countries on the Indian Ocean, including the Maldives. Thousands of people died, including many tourists. Combined with vast clean-up operations, the tsunami severely hampered tourism in the area for a time.

Individual low-price or even zero-price overnight stays have become more popular in the 2000s, especially with a strong growth in the hostel market and the establishment of services like CouchSurfing and airbnb. There has also been examples of jurisdictions wherein a significant portion of GDP is spent on altering the primary sources of revenue towards tourism, as has occurred, for instance, in Dubai.

== Forms of tourism ==
=== Mass tourism ===
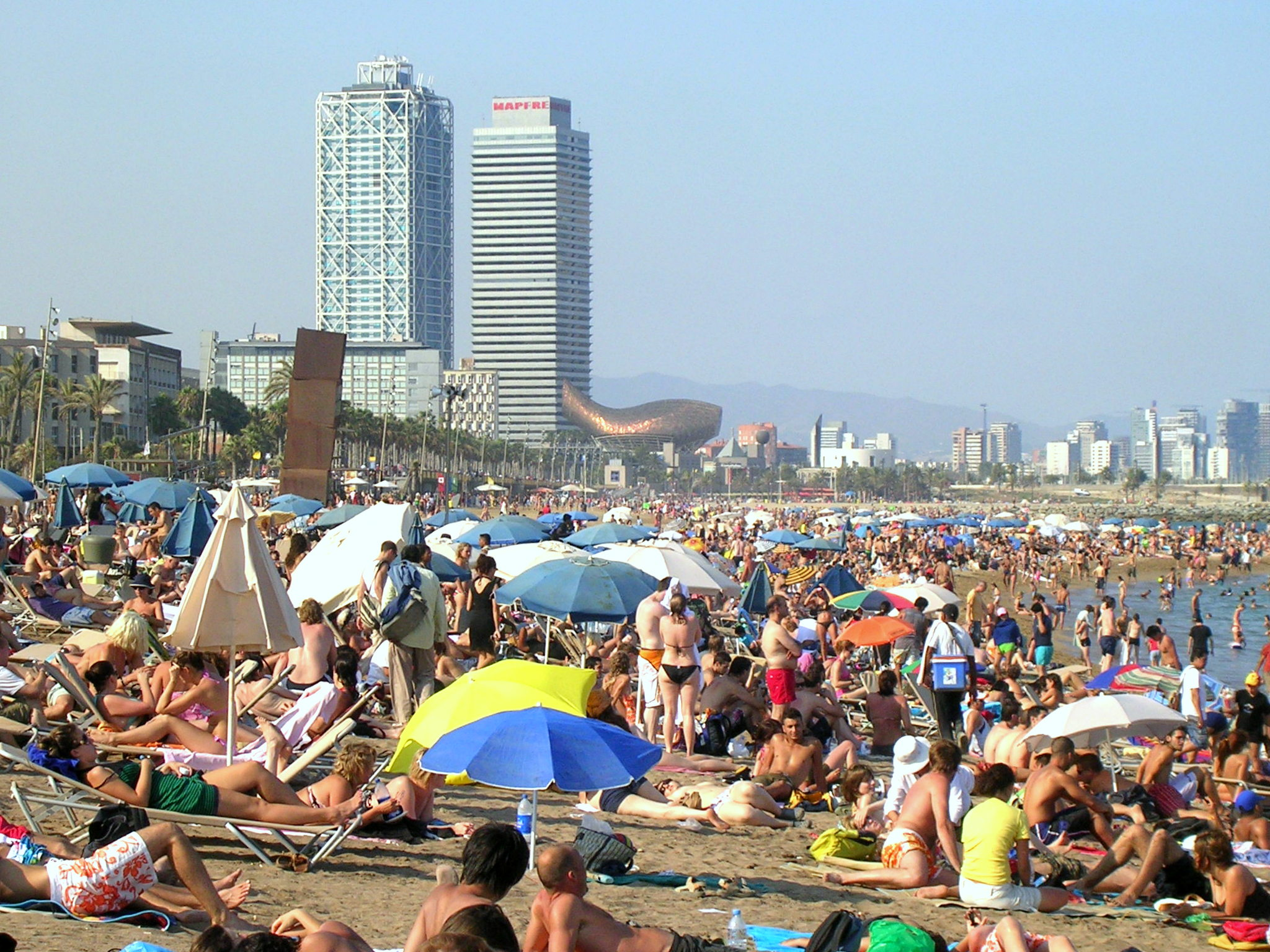
Tourists at the Mediterranean Coast of Barcelona in 2007

Mass tourism and its tourist attractions have emerged as among the most iconic demonstration of western consumer societies. Academics have defined mass tourism as travel by groups on pre-scheduled tours, usually under the organization of tourism professionals. The relationship between tourism companies, transportation operators and hotels is a central feature of mass tourism. Package tourism incorporates a close partnership between these three groups.

Travel developed during the early 20th century and was facilitated by the development of the automobiles and later by airplanes. Improvements in transportation allowed many people to travel quickly to places of leisure interest so that more people could begin to enjoy the benefits of leisure time.

By the mid-20th century, the Mediterranean Coast became the principal mass tourism destination. The 1960s and 1970s saw mass tourism play a major role in the Spanish economic "miracle".

In the 1960s and 1970s, scientists discussed negative socio-cultural impacts of tourism on host communities. Since the 1980s, the positive aspects of tourism began to be recognized as well.

In more recent times, mass tourism is something which has become a negative experience for local residents of cities and destinations that experience heavy tourism, especially in summer months. For example, in July 2024, protests by local residents were held in Barcelona, Spain, where "thousands of people joined an anti-tourism protest amid rising housing costs."

=== Niche tourism ===
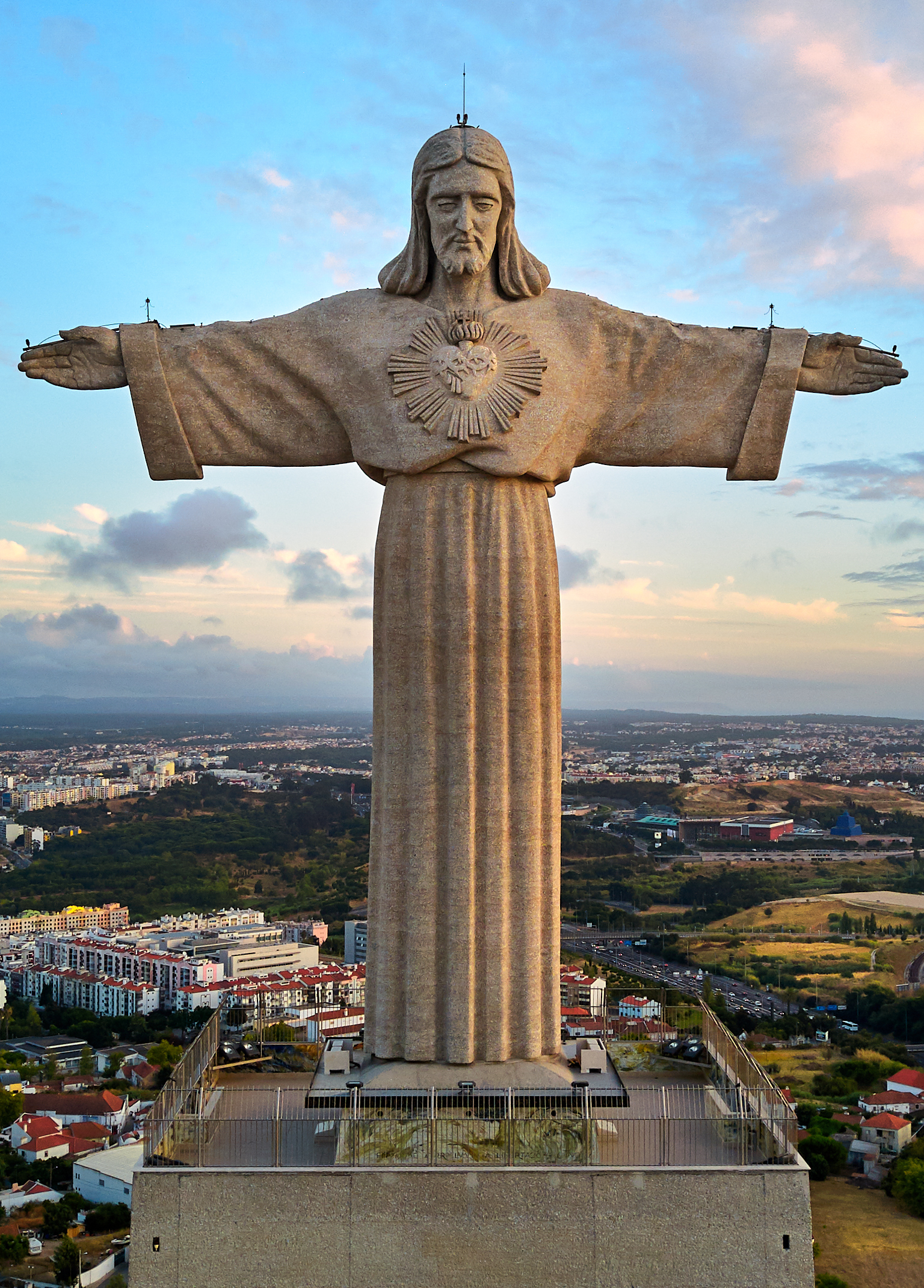
The Sanctuary of Christ the King, in Almada, has become one of the places most visited for religious tourism.

Niche tourism refers to the specialty forms of tourism that have emerged over the years, each with its own adjective. Many of these terms have come into common use by the tourism industry and academics. Others are emerging concepts that may or may not gain popular usage. Examples of different niche tourism markets are:

- Agritourism – Tourism involving agriculture
- Archaeotourism – Tourism around buildings and archaeological sites
- Beach tourism – Leisure activity and cultural phenomenon
- Bicycle tourism – Holidays with bicycles
- Birth tourism – Travel to give birth in another country
- Business tourism – Travel for work-related purposes
- Culinary tourism – Tourism with the aim of exploring the food
- Cultural tourism – Geographical tourism around a country or a region
- Dark tourism – Tourism involving travel to sites associated with death and tragedy (also called "black tourism" or "grief tourism")
- Domestic tourism – Travel for pleasure or business within one's country
- Eco tourism – Touring natural habitats while minimizing environmental impact
- Extreme tourism – Tourism for dangerous or high-risk experiences
- Film tourism – Tourism connected with film appearances
- Genealogy tourism – Tourism based on ancestry
- Geotourism – Tourism associated with geological attractions and destinations
- Heritage tourism – Tourism based on cultural heritage sites
- LGBT tourism – Tourism marketed to LGBTQ people
- Medical tourism – People traveling abroad to obtain medical treatment
- Nautical tourism – Tourism by boat travel
- Noctourism – Touristic experiences after dark
- Pop-culture tourism – Travel to locations featured in popular media
- Religious tourism – Travel to religious sites, whether spiritual or sightseeing
- Science tourism – Travel to notable science locations
- Scuba diving tourism – Industry based on recreational diver travel
- Sex tourism – Travel to engage in sexual activity
- Slum tourism – Visiting impoverished areas
- Sports tourism – Tourists observing or participating in sports
- Virtual tourism – Simulation of an existing location
- War tourism – Tourism for old war zones
- Wellness tourism – Tourism for the purpose of health and wellness
- Wildlife tourism – Travel for viewing wild animals in their natural habitats

Other terms used for niche or specialty travel forms include the term "destination" in the descriptions, such as destination weddings, and terms such as location vacation.

=== Sports tourism ===
According to the UN, sports tourism refers to a "travel experience of the tourist who either observes as a spectator or actively participates in a sporting event". It can be associated with negative impacts such as traffic congestion, vandalism, and anti-social behaviour by excited sports fans. Sports tourist destinations may therefore be subject to public displays of resentment and antagonism, even though the host community may experience substantial economic benefits. The growth and decline of sports tourism is often related to international sporting events, such as the Olympic Games. For example, the irreversible environmental damage caused by the 1992 Winter Olympics is cited as a reason for stagnating ski tourism.

=== Water tourism ===
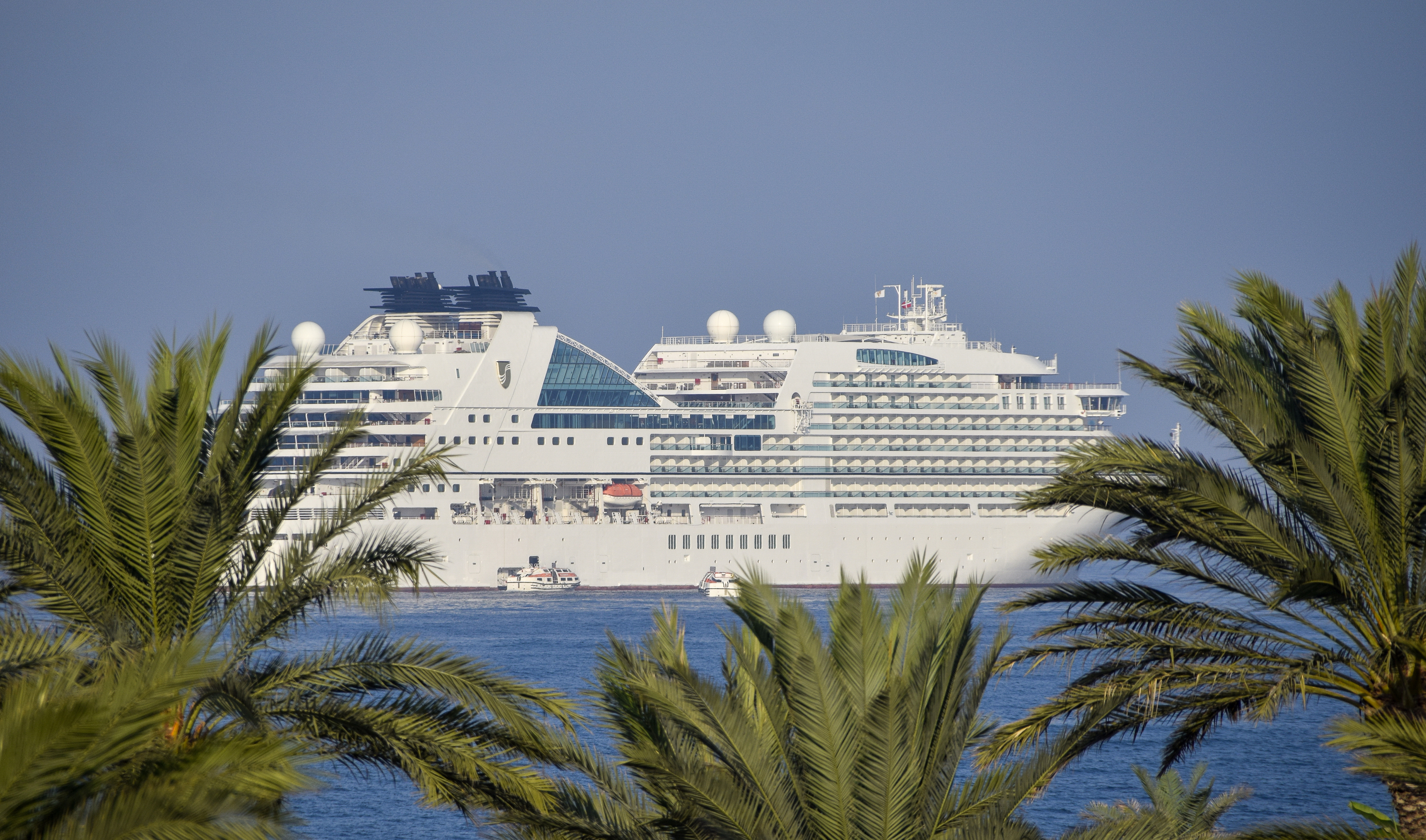
The modern cruise ship Seabourn Ovation in the Mediterranean

Cruising is a popular form of water tourism. Leisure cruise ships were introduced by P&O in 1844, sailing from Southampton to destinations such as Gibraltar, Malta and Athens. In 1891, German businessman Albert Ballin sailed the ship Augusta Victoria from Hamburg into the Mediterranean Sea. 29 June 1900 saw the launching of the first purpose-built cruise ship,Prinzessin Victoria Luise, built in Hamburg for the Hamburg America Line.

=== Winter tourism ===
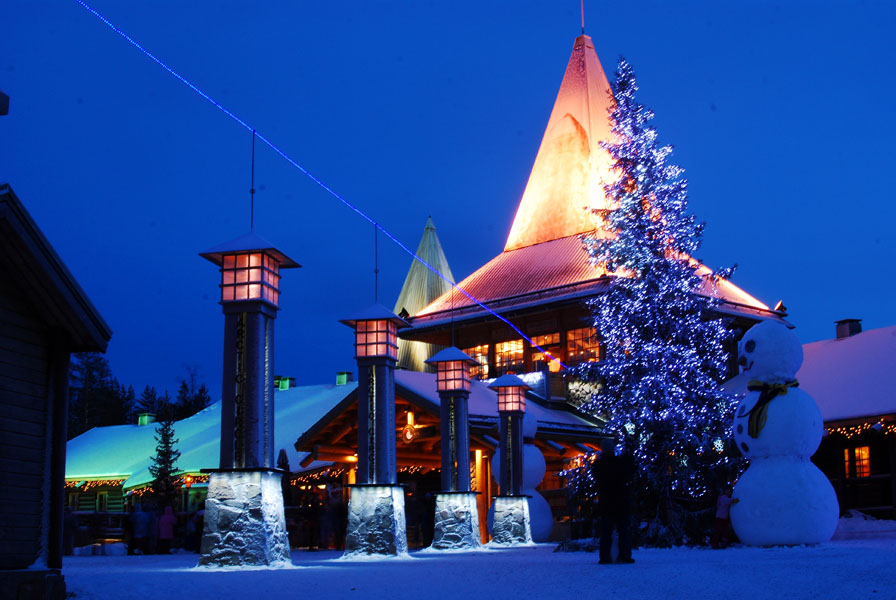
The Santa Claus Village at the Arctic Circle in Rovaniemi, Finland is a significant tourist hotspot in Northern Europe.

St. Moritz, Switzerland became the cradle of the developing winter tourism in the 1860s when hotel manager Johannes Badrutt invited some summer guests from England to return in the winter to see the snowy landscape. It was, however, only in the 1970s when winter tourism took over the lead from summer tourism in many of the Swiss ski resorts. Even in winter, up to one third of all guests (depending on the location) consist of non-skiers.

=== Sustainable tourism ===
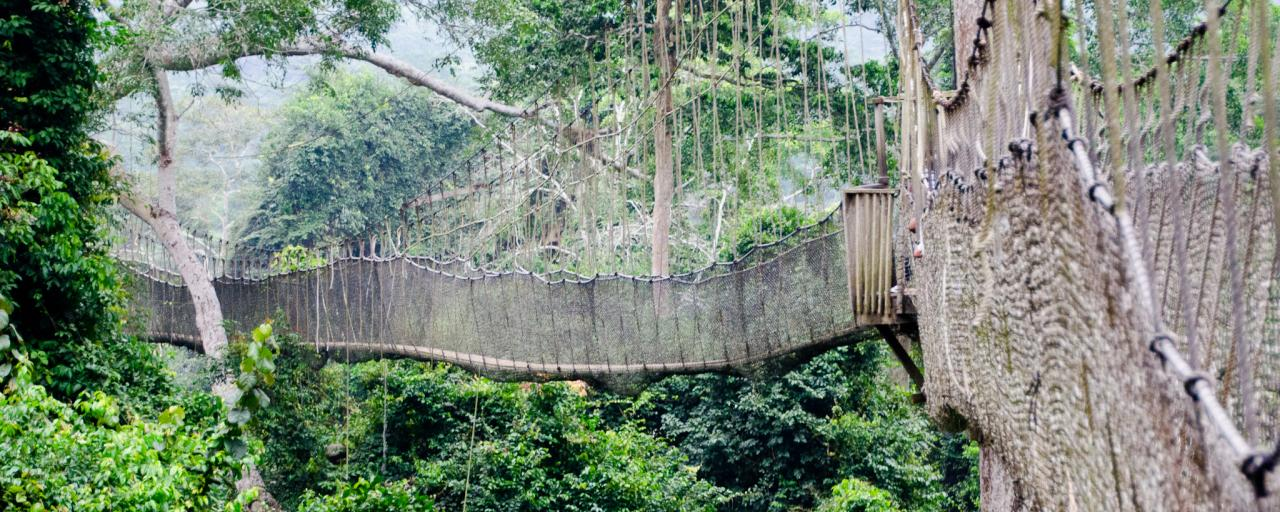
A canopy walkway at Kakum National Park in Ghana, ensuring that tourists have least direct impact on the surrounding ecology. The visitor park received the Global Tourism for Tomorrow Award in 1998.

Sustainable tourism is a concept that covers the complete tourism experience, including concern for economic, social, and environmental issues as well as attention to improving tourists' experiences and addressing the needs of host communities. Sustainable tourism should embrace concerns for environmental protection, social equity, and the quality of life, cultural diversity, and a dynamic, viable economy delivering jobs and prosperity for all. It has its roots in sustainable development and there can be some confusion as to what "sustainable tourism" means. There is now broad consensus that tourism should be sustainable. In fact, all forms of tourism have the potential to be sustainable if planned, developed and managed properly. Tourist development organizations are promoting sustainable tourism practices in order to mitigate negative effects caused by the growing impact of tourism, for example its environmental impacts.

The United Nations World Tourism Organization emphasized these practices by promoting sustainable tourism as part of the Sustainable Development Goals, through programs like the International Year for Sustainable Tourism for Development in 2017. There is a direct link between sustainable tourism and several of the 17 Sustainable Development Goals (SDGs). Tourism for SDGs focuses on how SDG 8 ("decent work and economic growth"), SDG 12 ("responsible consumption and production") and SDG 14 ("life below water") implicate tourism in creating a sustainable economy.

=== Outdoor tourism ===
Outdoor tourism is generally categorized into nature, eco, and adventure tourism (NEAT). These categories share many similarities but also possess definite and unique characteristics. Nature tourism generally encompasses tourism activities that would take place outside. This type of tourism has a low barrier to entry and is accessible to a large population. Ecotourism focuses on education, maintaining a social responsibility for the community and the environment, and centering economic growth around the local economy. Weaver describes ecotourism as sustainable nature-based tourism. Ecotourism is more specific than nature tourism and works toward accomplishing a specific goal through the outdoors. Ecotourism, also known as ecological tourism, is responsible travel to fragile, pristine, and usually protected areas that strives to be low-impact and (often) small-scale. It helps educate the traveler; provides funds for conservation; directly benefits the economic development and political empowerment of local communities, and fosters respect for different cultures and for human rights. Take only memories and leave only footprints is a very common slogan in protected areas. Tourist destinations are shifting to low carbon emissions following the trend of visitors more focused in being environmentally responsible adopting a sustainable behavior.

Adventure tourism is the most extreme of the categories and includes participation in activities and sports that require a level of skill or experience, risk, and physical exertion, such as white water rafting, ice climbing, and mountaineering. Adventure tourism often appeals less to the general public than nature and ecotourism, and tends to draw in individuals who already partake in such activities.

=== Volunteer tourism ===
Volunteer tourism (or voluntourism) is growing as a largely Western phenomenon, with volunteers traveling to aid those less fortunate than themselves in order to counter global inequalities. Volunteer tourism is defined as applying to “those tourists who, for various reasons, volunteer in an organized way to undertake holidays that might involve aiding or alleviating the material poverty of some groups in society” (Wearing, 2001). VSO, founded in 1958 in the UK, and the US Peace Corps, founded in 1958, were the first large-scale voluntary organizations sending groups, initially arising to modernize less economically developed countries, which, it was hoped, would curb the influence of communism.

This form of tourism is largely praised for being a more sustainable approach to travel, with tourists attempting to assimilate into local cultures and avoiding the criticism of consumptive, exploitative mass tourism. Voluntourism is criticized by some scholars who suggest that volunteer tourism may have negative effects when it allegedly undermines the local workforce, socioeconomically pressuring unwilling host communities to adopt Western initiatives. While host communities without a strong heritage fail to retain volunteers who become dissatisfied with their experiences, volunteer shortages persist. Increasingly, organizations such as VSO have been concerned with community-centric volunteer schemes where power to control the future of the community is in the hands of locals.

=== Pro-poor tourism ===
Community tourism in Sierra Leone → The story of a community in Sierra Leone trying to manage tourism in a responsible manner

Pro-poor tourism, which seeks to help the poorest people in developing countries, has been receiving increasing attention by those involved in development; the issue has been addressed through small-scale projects in local communities and through attempts by Ministries of Tourism to attract large numbers of tourists. Research by the Overseas Development Institute suggests that neither is the best way to encourage tourists' money to reach the poorest as only 25% or less (far less in some cases) ever reaches the poor; successful examples of money reaching the poor include mountaineering in Tanzania and cultural tourism in Luang Prabang, Laos. There is also the possibility of pro-poor tourism principles being adopted in the developed world as well.

=== Recession tourism ===
Recession tourism is a travel trend which evolved by way of the world economic crisis. Recession tourism is defined by low-cost and high-value experiences taking place at once-popular generic retreats. Various recession tourism hotspots have seen business boom during the recession thanks to comparatively low costs of living and a slow world job market, suggesting travelers are elongating trips where their money travels further. This concept is not widely used in tourism research. It is related to the short-lived phenomenon that is more widely known as staycation. In general, studies have primarily focused on the short-term effects of the crisis on tourism demand, often overlooking the long-term implications for the competitive positioning of the impacted destinations.

=== Medical tourism ===
When there is a significant price difference between countries for a given medical procedure, particularly in Southeast Asia, India, Sri Lanka, Eastern Europe, Cuba and Canada where there are different regulatory regimes, in relation to particular medical procedures (e.g. dentistry), traveling to take advantage of the price or regulatory differences is often referred to as "medical tourism".

Sleep tourism focuses on medical treatments or other approaches, and may focus on people who have difficulty falling asleep, people who experience interrupted sleep, people who don't feel rested after sleeping, snoring, breathing difficulties, and dreaming.

=== Event tourism ===
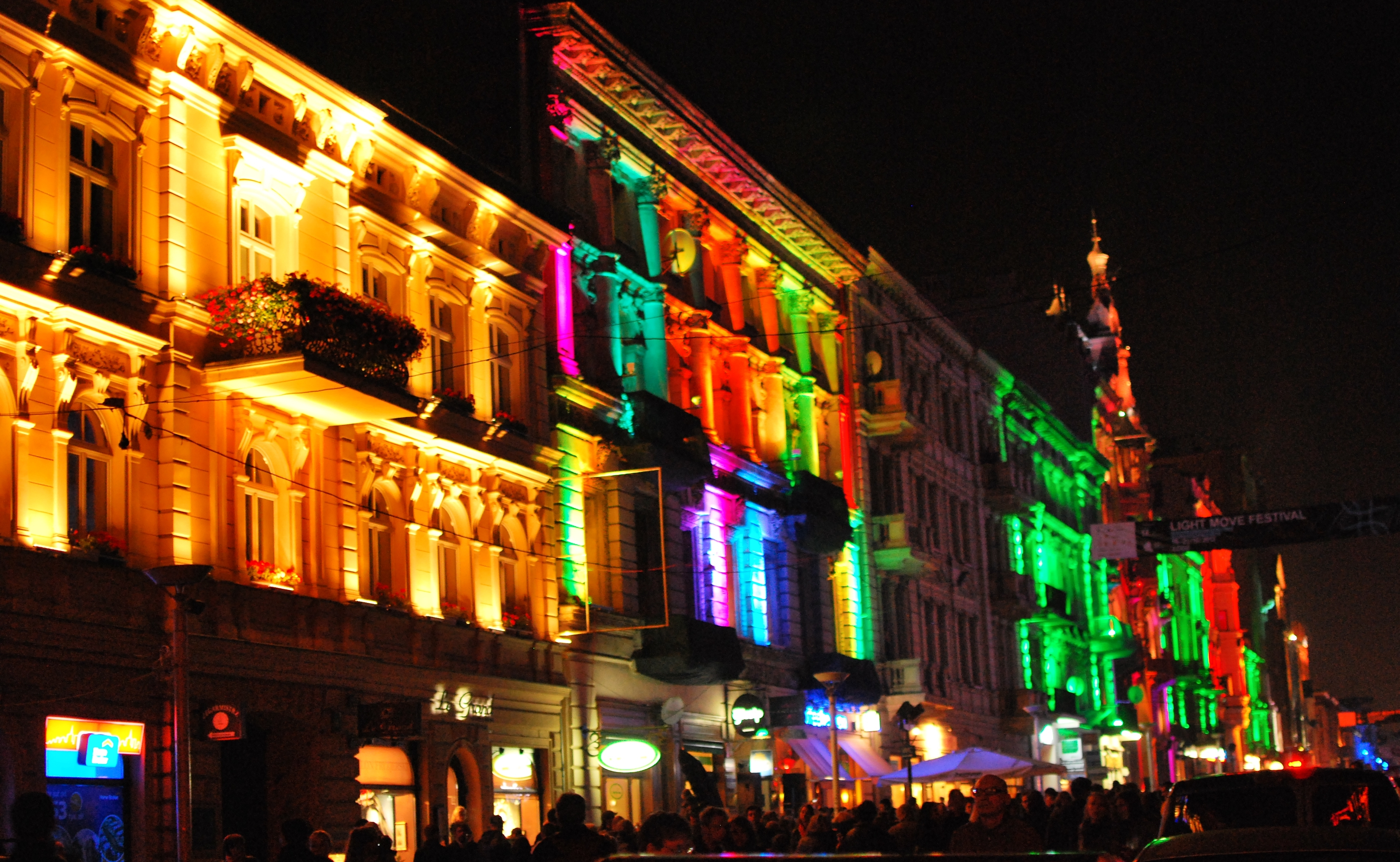
Light Move Festival in Łódź, Poland

This type of tourism is focused on tourists coming into a region to either participate in an event or to see an organized event put on by the city/region. This type of tourism can also fall under sustainable tourism as well and companies that create a sustainable event to attend open up a chance to not only the consumer but their workers to learn and develop from the experience. Creating a sustainable atmosphere creates a chance to inform and encourage sustainable practices. An example of event tourism would be the music festival South by Southwest that is hosted in Austin, Texas annually. Every year people from all over the world flock to the city for one week to sit in on technology talks and see bands perform. People are drawn here to experience something that they are not able to experience in their hometown, which defines event tourism.

=== Creative tourism ===
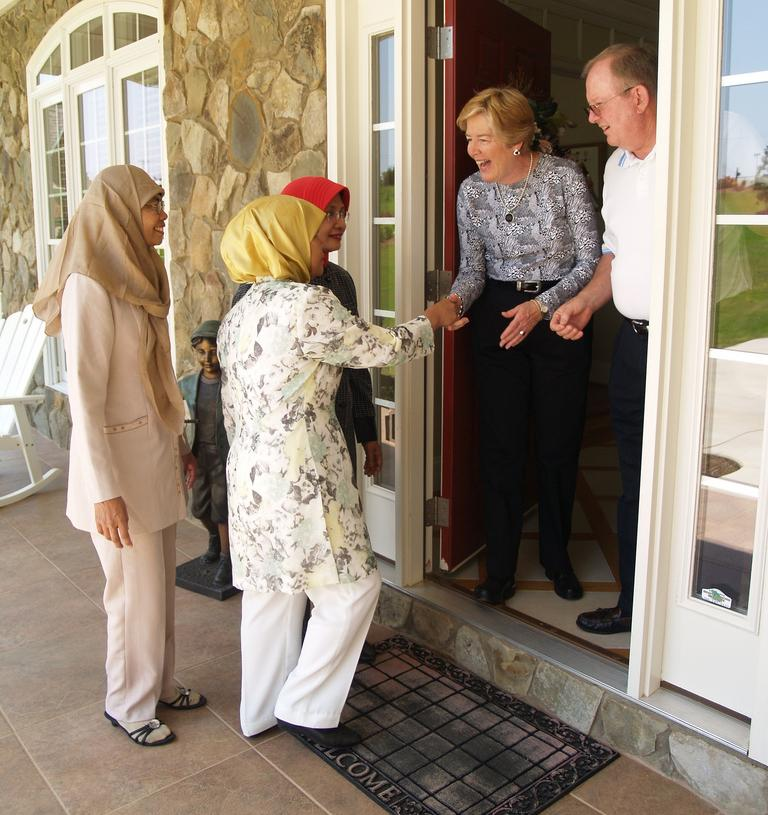
Friendship Force visitors from Indonesia meeting their hosts in Hartwell, Georgia, United States

Creative tourism has existed as a form of cultural tourism, since the early beginnings of tourism itself. Its European roots date back to the time of the Grand Tour, which saw the sons of aristocratic families traveling for the purpose of mostly interactive, educational experiences. More recently, creative tourism has been given its own name by Crispin Raymond and Greg Richards, who as members of the Association for Tourism and Leisure Education (ATLAS), have directed a number of projects for the European Commission, including cultural and crafts tourism, known as sustainable tourism. They have defined "creative tourism" as tourism related to the active participation of travelers in the culture of the host community, through interactive workshops and informal learning experiences.

Meanwhile, the concept of creative tourism has been picked up by high-profile organizations such as UNESCO, who through the Creative Cities Network, have endorsed creative tourism as an engaged, authentic experience that promotes an active understanding of the specific cultural features of a place. UNESCO wrote in one of its documents: "'Creative Tourism' involves more interaction, in which the visitor has an educational, emotional, social, and participative interaction with the place, its living culture, and the people who live there. They feel like a citizen." Saying so, the tourist will have the opportunity to take part in workshops, classes and activities related to the culture of the destination.

More recently, creative tourism has gained popularity as a form of cultural tourism, drawing on active participation by travelers in the culture of the host communities they visit. Several countries offer examples of this type of tourism development, including the United Kingdom, Austria, France, the Bahamas, Jamaica, Spain, Italy, New Zealand and South Korea.

Providers are also attracted to creative tourism as a new way to share culture, highlighting intangible heritage (craft workshops, cooking classes, etc.) and optimizing the use of existing infrastructure (for example, through renting halls and auditoriums).

=== Experiential tourism ===
Experiential travel (or "immersion travel") is one of the major market trends in the modern tourism industry. It is an approach to traveling which focuses on experiencing a country, city or particular place by connecting to its history, people, food and culture.

The term "experiential travel" has been mentioned in publications since 1985, but it was not discovered as a meaningful market trend until much later.

=== Dark tourism ===
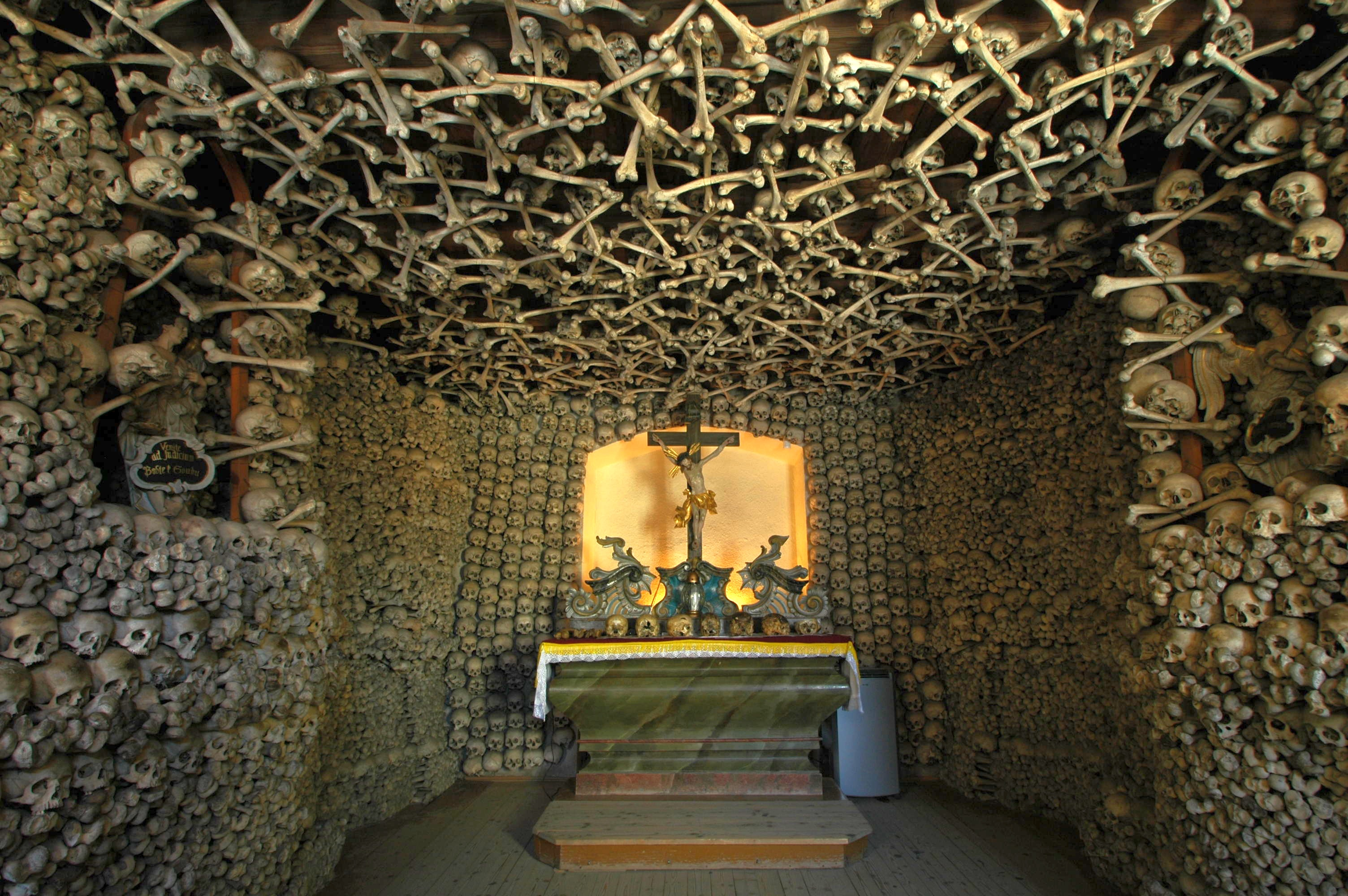
The Skull Chapel in Kudowa-Zdrój, Lower Silesian Voivodeship, Poland, is an example of an attraction for dark tourism. Its interior walls, ceiling and foundations are adorned by human remains. It is the only such monument in Poland, and one of six in Europe.

One emerging area of special interest has been identified by Lennon and Foley (2000) as "dark" tourism. This type of tourism involves visits to "dark" sites, such as battlegrounds, scenes of horrific crimes or acts of genocide, for example, concentration camps. Its origins are rooted in fairgrounds and medieval fairs.

=== Social tourism ===
Social tourism is making tourism available to poor people who otherwise could not afford to travel for their education or recreation. It includes youth hostels and low-priced holiday accommodation run by voluntary organizations and or publicly owned enterprises. In May 1959, at the second Congress of Social Tourism in Austria, Walter Hunziker proposed the following definition: "Social tourism is a type of tourism practiced by low-income groups, and which is rendered possible and facilitated by entirely separate and therefore easily recognizable services".

=== Doom tourism ===
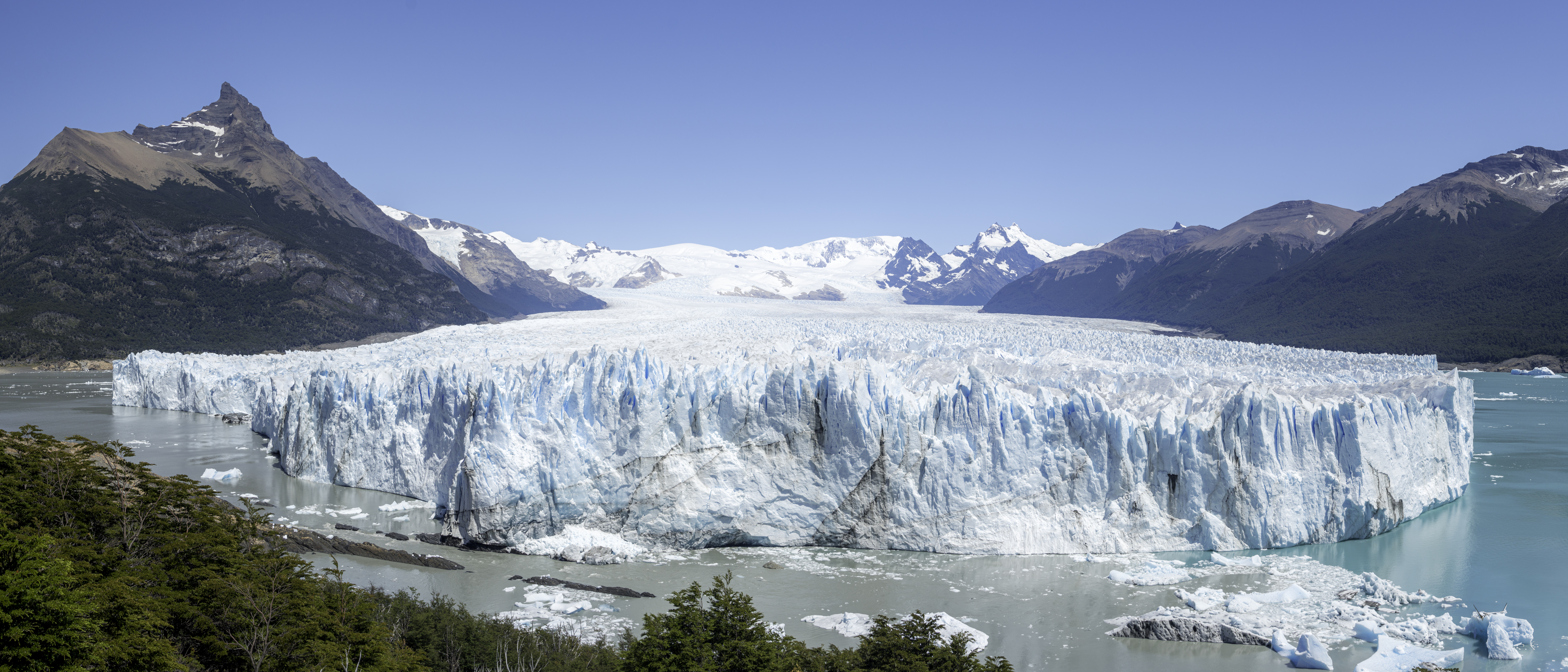
Perito Moreno Glacier, Patagonia, Argentina

Also known as "tourism of doom," or "last chance tourism", involves traveling to places that are environmentally or otherwise threatened (such as the ice caps of Mount Kilimanjaro, the melting glaciers of Patagonia, or the coral of the Great Barrier Reef) before it is too late. The trend emerged in the 21st century, identified in 2007 by travel trade magazine in 2007 and explored in The New York Times.

This type of tourism has been on the rise. Some see the trend as related to sustainable tourism or ecotourism due to the fact that a number of these tourist destinations are considered threatened by environmental factors such as global warming, overpopulation or climate change. Others worry that travel to many of these threatened locations increases an individual's carbon footprint and only hastens problems threatened locations are already facing. Climate change has been making last chance tourism more popular.

=== Religious tourism ===
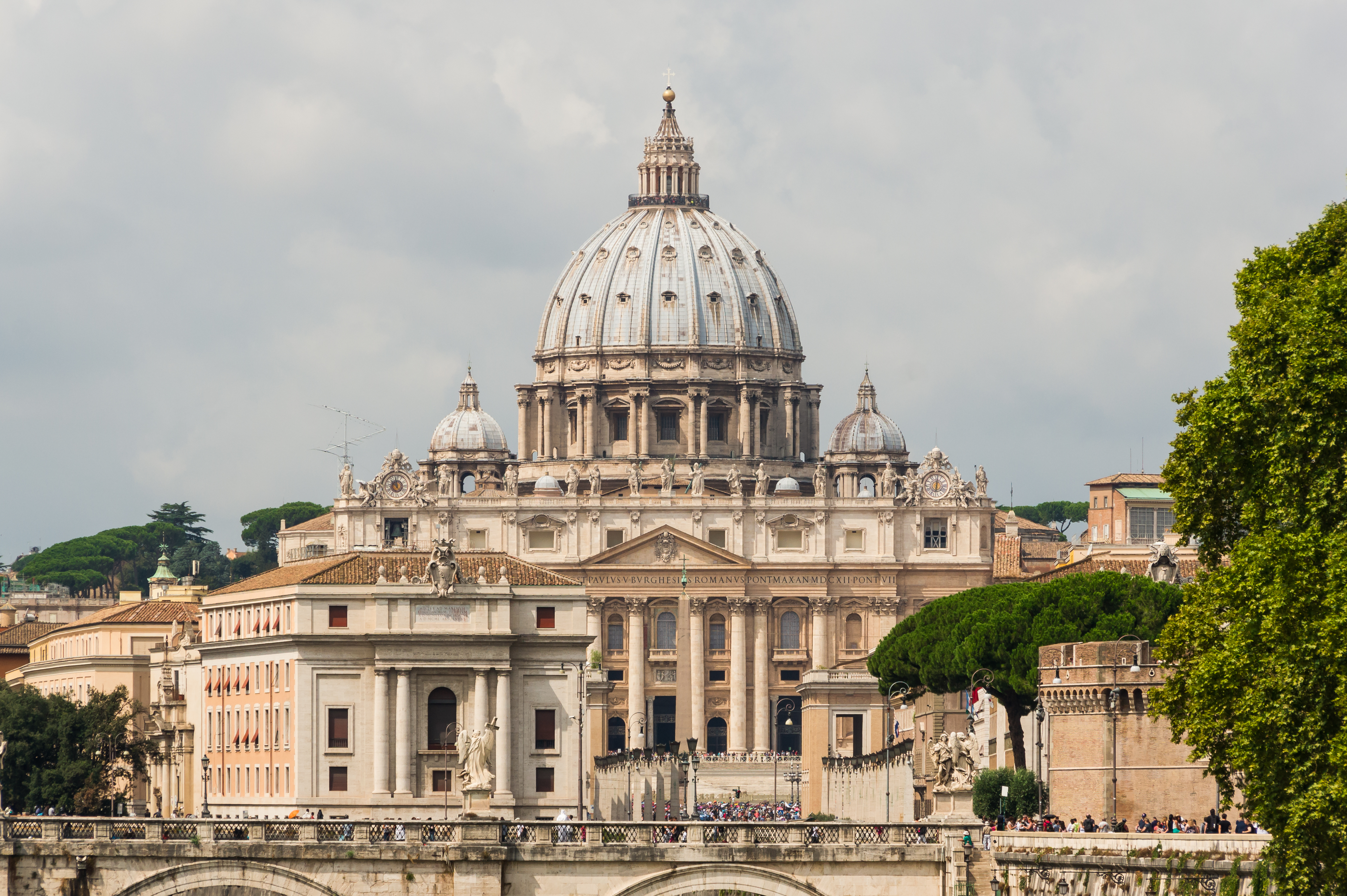
St. Peter's Basilica in Vatican City, the papal enclave within the Italian city of Rome, one of the largest religious tourism sites in the world

Religious tourism, in particular pilgrimage, can serve to strengthen faith and to demonstrate devotion. Religious tourists may seek destinations whose image encourages them to believe that they can strengthen the religious elements of their self-identity in a positive manner. Given this, the perceived image of a destination may be positively influenced by whether it conforms to the requirements of their religious self-identity or not.

== Effects of tourism ==
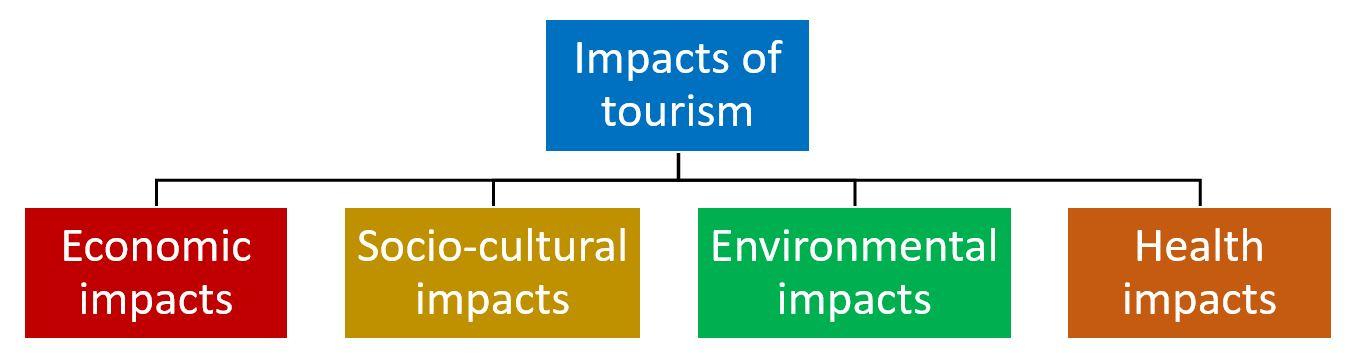
Impacts of tourism

Tourism has a significant impact on destinations, influencing their economy, culture, environment, and communities. Tourism positively affects many parties in society but can also be detrimental in certain situations.

In general, tourism positively affects the economy of its destination. The purchasing of commodities, and the usage of hotels and transport by tourists all contribute to economic activity within the country.

The sociocultural impacts of tourism are less straightforward, bringing both benefits and challenges to the destination. The interactions between tourists and locals foster a cultural exchange, particularly exposing tourists to a different culture through direct interactions and overall immersion. However, differing expectations in the societal and moral values of the tourists and those from the host location can cause friction between the two parties.

While tourism may have positive impacts environmentally, through an increase in awareness of certain environmental issues, tourism overall negatively impacts the environment. Tourist destinations and attractions located in the wild may neglect environmental concerns to satisfy the demands of tourists, creating issues such as pollution and deforestation.

Tourism also has positive and negative health outcomes for local people. The short-term negative impacts of tourism on residents' health are related to the density of tourist arrivals, the risk of disease transmission, road accidents, higher crime levels, as well as traffic congestion, crowding, and other stressful factors. In addition, residents can experience anxiety and depression related to their risk perceptions about mortality rates, food insecurity, contact with infected tourists, etc. At the same time, there are positive long-term impacts of tourism on residents' health and well-being outcomes through improving healthcare access, positive emotions, novelty, and social interactions.

=== Economic significance of tourism ===
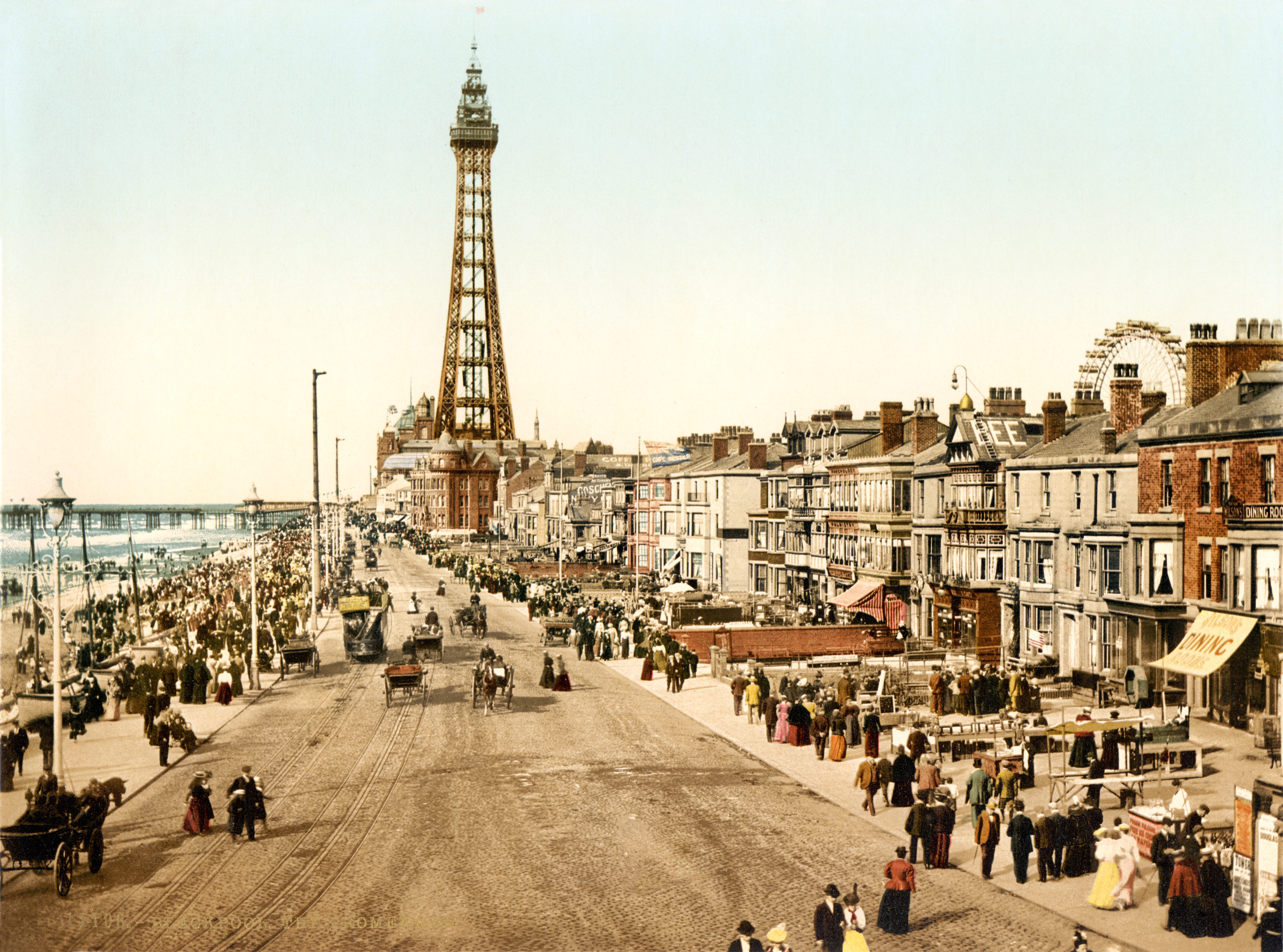
Photochrom of the Blackpool promenade c. 1898

The tourism industry, as part of the service sector, has become an important source of income for many regions and even for entire countries. The Manila Declaration on World Tourism of 1980 recognized its importance as "an activity essential to the life of nations because of its direct effects on the social, cultural, educational, and economic sectors of national societies, and on their international relations."

Tourism brings large amounts of income into a local economy in the form of payment for goods and services needed by tourists, accounting as of 2011 for 30% of the world's trade in services, and, as an invisible export, for 6% of overall exports of goods and services. It also generates opportunities for employment in the service sector of the economy associated with tourism. It is also claimed that travel broadens the mind.

The hospitality industries which benefit from tourism include transportation services (such as airlines, cruise ships, transit, trains and taxicabs); lodging (including hotels, hostels, homestays, resorts and renting out rooms); and entertainment venues (such as amusement parks, casinos and shopping malls, among others.). This is in addition to goods bought by tourists, including souvenirs.

On the flipside, tourism can degrade people and sour relationships between host and guest. Tourism frequently also puts additional pressure on the local environment.

The economic foundations of tourism are essentially the cultural assets, the cultural property and the nature of the travel location. The World Heritage Sites are particularly worth mentioning today because they are real tourism magnets. But even a country's current or former form of government can be decisive for tourism. For example, the fascination of the British royal family brings millions of tourists to Great Britain every year and thus the economy around £550 million a year. The Habsburg family can be mentioned in Central Europe. According to estimates, the Habsburg brand should generate tourism sales of 60 million euros per year for Vienna alone. The tourist principle "Habsburg sells" applies.

== Tourism industry growth ==
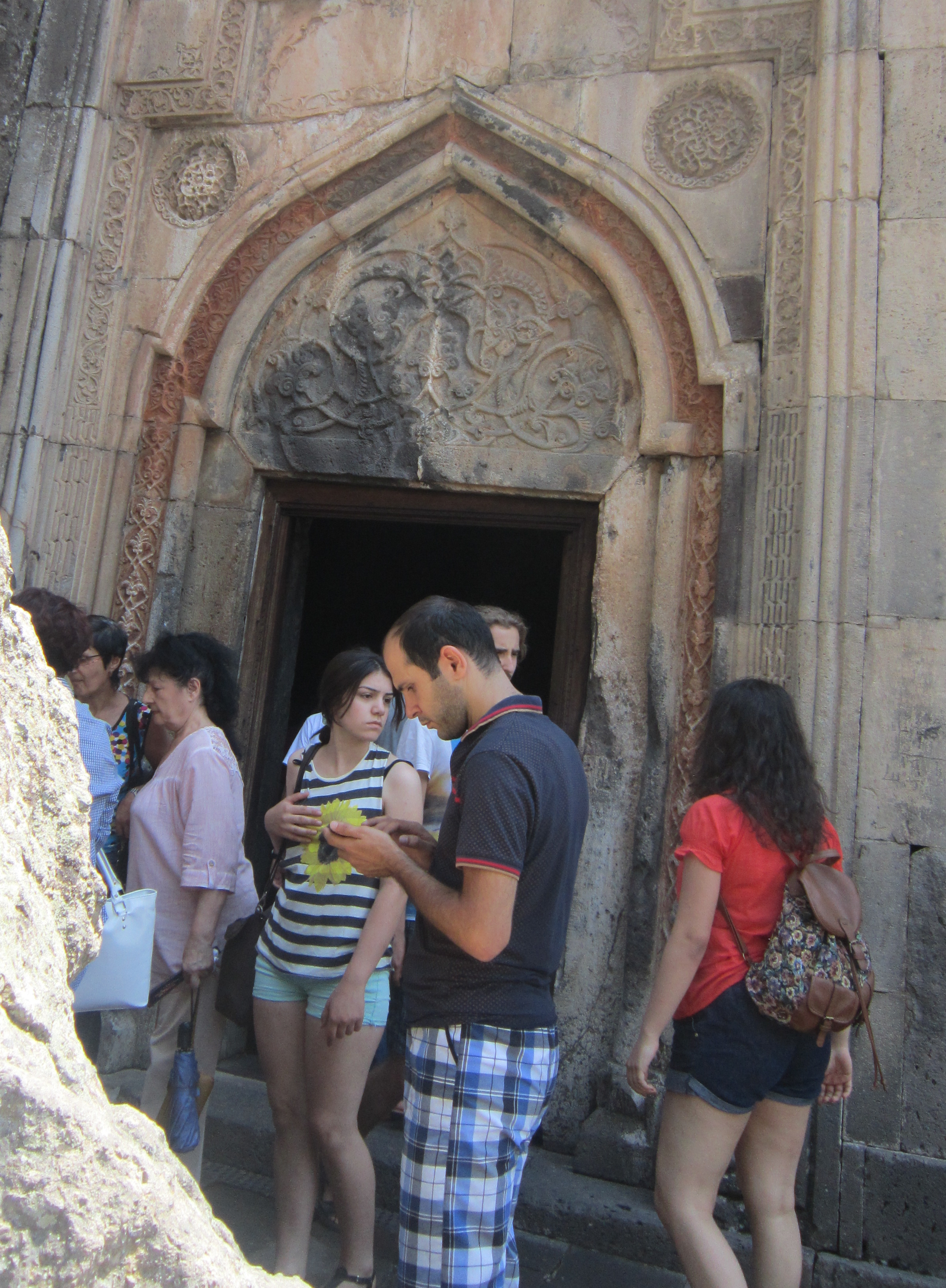
Cultural tourism: tourists outside a Geghard monastery in Armenia, 2015

As a result of the late-2000s recession, international arrivals experienced a strong slowdown beginning in June 2008. Growth from 2007 to 2008 was only 3.7 percent during the first eight months of 2008. This slowdown on international tourism demand was also reflected in the aviation industry, with negative growth in September 2008 and a 3.3% growth in passenger traffic through September. The hotel industry also reported a slowdown, with room occupancy declining. In 2009 worldwide tourism arrivals decreased by 3.8 percent. By the first quarter of 2009, real travel demand in the United States had fallen 6 percent over six quarters. While this was considerably milder than what occurred after the September 11 attacks, the decline was at twice the rate, as real GDP has fallen. However, evidence suggests that tourism as a global phenomenon shows no signs of substantially abating in the long term. The UNWTO has noted, that tourists increasingly view vacations and travel as a necessity rather than a luxury, and that this shift in attitudes may explain tourist numbers recovering globally in 2009.

It has been suggested there is a strong correlation between tourism expenditure per capita and the degree to which countries play in the global context. Not only as a result of the important economic contribution of the tourism industry, but also as an indicator of the degree of confidence with which global citizens leverage the resources of the globe for the benefit of their local economies. This is why any projections of growth in tourism may serve as an indication of the relative influence that each country will exercise in the future.

=== Security in tourism ===
Security in Tourism is a subdiscipline of tourist studies that explores the factors that affect the ontological security of tourists. Risks are evaluated by their impact and nature. Tourism security includes methodologies, theories and techniques oriented to protect the organic image of tourist destinations. Three academic waves are significant in tourism security: risk perception theory, disaster management, and post-disaster consumption.

Andrew Spencer & Peter Tarlow argue that tourism security is not an easy concept to define. It includes a set of sub-disciplines, and global risks different in nature which cause different effects in the tourism industry. The rise of tourism security and safety as a consolidated discipline coincides with the globalization and ultimate maturation of the industry worldwide. Some threats include, for example, terrorist groups looking to destabilize governments affecting not only the local economies but killing foreign tourists to cause geopolitical tensions between delivery-country and receiving-tourist countries.

=== Impacts of the COVID-19 pandemic ===
In 2020 the COVID-19 pandemic travel bans and a substantial reduction in passenger travel by air and sea contributed to a sharp decline in tourism activity. The World Tourism Organization (WTO) reported a 70% decrease in international travel in 2020, where 165 of 217 worldwide destinations completely stopped international tourism by April 2020. Since every country imposes different travel restrictions, it makes traveling plans complicated and often too difficult to figure out; thus, the willingness to travel among the general population decreases. It is estimated that the United States lost 147 billion U.S. dollars in tourism revenue between January and October 2020. Spain had the next highest loss of revenue at around 46.7 billion U.S. dollars, and countries in Africa collectively lost about 55 billion U.S. dollars between April and June 2020.

== See also ==
- Cultural travel – Style of tourism
- Environmental effects of aviation – Effect of emissions from aircraft engines
- International tourism advertising – Tourism-related marketing
- Outline of tourism – Overview and topical guide of tourism
- Overtourism – Excessive number of tourists
- Space tourism – Human space travel for recreation
- Terminal tourism
- Tombstone tourist – Person who visits grave sites
- Tour guide – Person who provides cultural heritage interpretation to tourists
- Tourist attraction – Place of interest where tourists visit
- Tourist motivation – Psychological forces that lead people to travel for leisure
- Touron – Pejorative for irresponsible tourists
- Travel agency – Retailer that provides tourism-related services
- Travel visa – Authority to enter, stay in, or exit a polity
- World Tourism rankings – List compiled by the UN World Tourism Organization
- Tourismphobia – Negative attitudes towards tourists

== Bibliography ==
- Costa, P (1991). "Managing tourism carrying capacity of art cities". The Tourist Review. 46 (4): 8–11. doi:10.1108/eb058076.
- Garlick, S (2002). "Revealing the unseen: Tourism, art and photography". Cultural Studies. 16 (2): 289–305. doi:10.1080/09502380110107599.
- Gartner, W.C. (1993). "Image formation process". Journal of Travel & Tourism Marketing. 2 (2–3): 191–216. doi:10.1300/j073v02n02_12.
- Hughes, H.L. (1989). "Tourism and the arts". Tourism Management. 10 (2): 97–99. doi:10.1016/0261-5177(89)90050-2.
- Phelps, A (1986). "Holiday destination image: The problem of assessment—an example developed in Minorca". Tourism Management. 7 (3): 168–80. doi:10.1016/0261-5177(86)90003-8.
- Richardson, S.; Crompton, J. (1988). "Cultural variations in perceptions of vacation attributes". Tourism Management. 9 (2): 128–36. doi:10.1016/0261-5177(88)90022-2.
