= Cultural travel =

Style of tourism

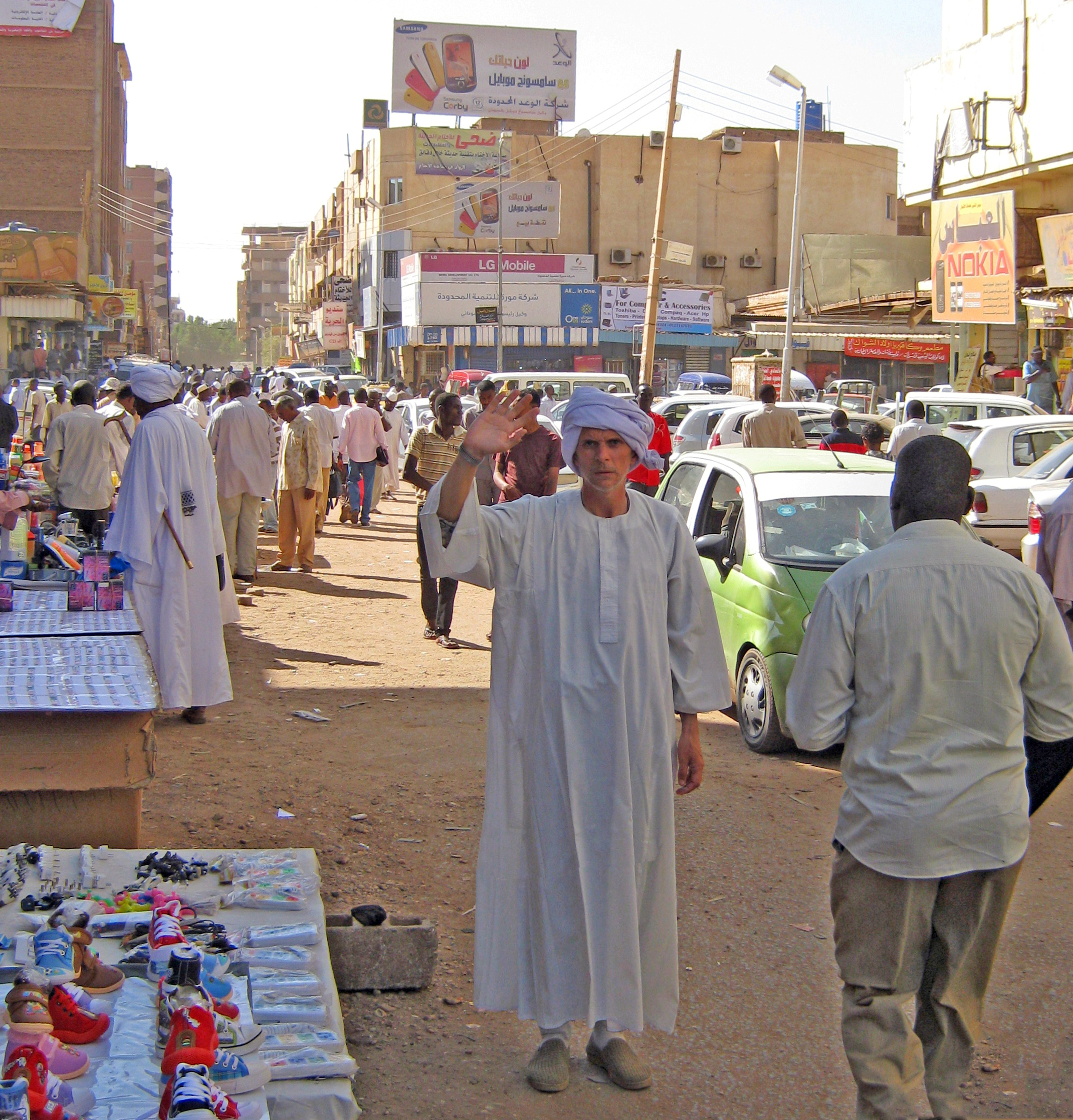
Russian traveler, the subject of cultural travel in the traditional clothes of the country of temporary stay (Khartoum, Sudan) 2011

Cultural travel is a type of travel that emphasizes experiencing life within a foreign culture, rather than from the outside as a temporary visitor. Cultural travelers leave their home environment at home, bringing only themselves and a desire to become part of the culture they visit. Cultural travel goes beyond cultural exploration or discovery; it involves a transformation in way of life.

This definition was first used by Gary Langer "Travel to Learn". Transitions Abroad. 1. Transitions Abroad Publishing: 12–15. March 1977. as a way of describing travel that requires a "transition" to a new level of understanding of and appreciation for a foreign culture.

The term is often distorted and misused by travel agents, tour operators and international tourism organizations. Culture primarily has to do with people and less with places or things. So visiting museums, touring ancient structures, attending festivals, and eating local food does not provide the same experience as becoming a member of the culture itself..

Staying in local accommodations, or homestays, and getting immersed in local traditions with the locals you meet are forms of cultural travel. The goal of cultural travel is to understand the local culture by experiencing it.

The antithesis of cultural travel is tourism, where people bring their home environment with them wherever they go and apply it to whatever they see.
