= Terminal tourism =

Terminal tourism refers to non-passengers accessing businesses and facilities within airport terminals. Individuals without tickets who access businesses and facilities in airport terminals are referred to as terminal tourists. Reasons for engaging in terminal tourism, include access to shopping and restaurants, aircraft spotting, and accompanying traveling family members. Traditionally, the general public had unrestricted access to businesses and facilities within airport terminals, however after the September 11 attacks in the United States, access in some airports was restricted to either higher security or limiting access only to ticketed passengers and employees.

== In the United States ==
In the United States, the concept was first accepted at Pittsburgh International Airport (PIT) in 2017. Since then, similar programs have also been created in Tampa International Airport (TPA), Seattle–Tacoma International Airport (SEA), Detroit Metropolitan Airport (DTW), and Louis Armstrong New Orleans International Airport (MSY).

=== Security ===
Terminal tourists are subject to the same security measures as passengers. Some airports limit the times and number of non-travelers who are granted access, while others require a reservation. Everybody must pass through airport security. Background checks are also occasionally a requirement, and prospective terminal tourists in the United States are screened against the No Fly List.
