= Royal Oak tube station =

London Underground station

Royal Oak
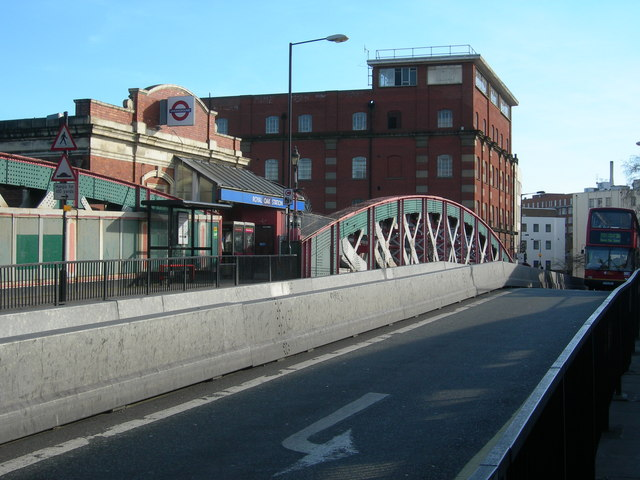
- Royal Oak station
- Interactive map of Royal Oak

General information
- Location: Westbourne Green
- Local authority: City of Westminster
- Managed by: London Underground
- Number of platforms: 2
- Fare zone: 2

London Underground annual entry and exit
- 2021: ▼1.19 million
- 2022: ▲1.98 million
- 2023: ▲2.14 million
- 2024: 2.14 million
- 2025: ▲2.18 million

Key dates
- 1871: Opened (GWR & H&C)
- 1934: Ended (GWR)
- 1970: Transferred to London Transport
- 2009: Started (Circle line)

Other information
- External links: TfL station info page
- Coordinates: 51.519167°N 0.188056°W

Royal Oak is a London Underground station. It is on the Circle and Hammersmith & City lines, between Westbourne Park and Paddington stations. The station is on Lord Hill's Bridge and is in London fare zone 2 for the London Underground. Although not heavily used at other times, the station is extremely busy during the annual Notting Hill Carnival. There is no wheelchair access to the platform. It is classed as a "local station" in Transport for London's "Fit for the Future" development outline.

The station opened on 30 October 1871, although the Metropolitan Railway extension to Hammersmith had opened in 1864. It is close to the elevated Westway section of the A40 road. The station is named after a nearby public house, "The Royal Oak" (later "The Railway Tap" and now "The Porchester"). There was a small newsagents kiosk next to the ticket office from the 1950s to 1986, when it was closed to make room for ticketing machines needed for the Underground Ticketing System (UTS).

== History ==
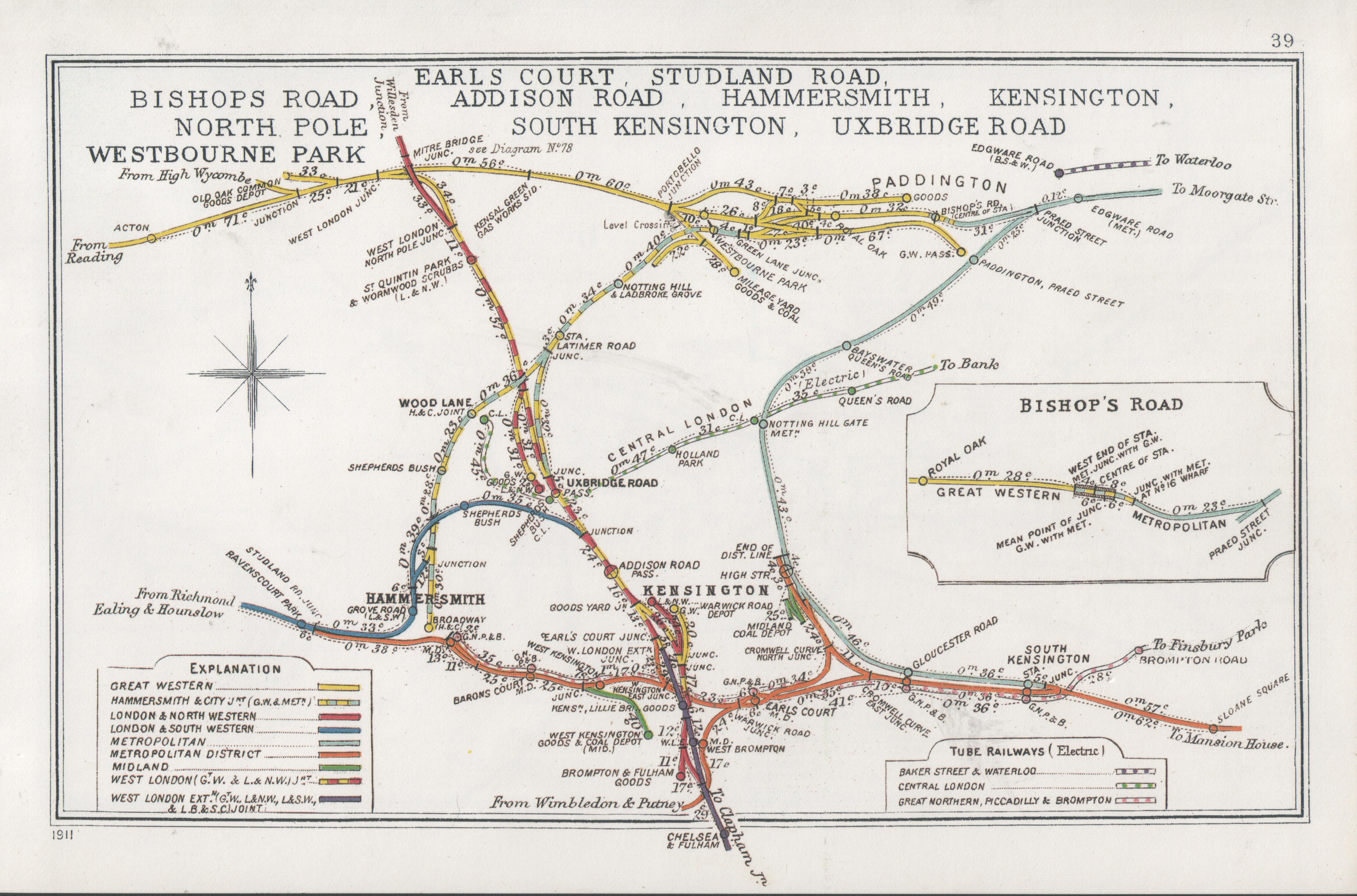
A 1911 Railway Clearing House map, showing the GWR main line from Paddington to Acton (yellow), the Hammersmith & City Railway (yellow and blue), and other railways in the vicinity of Royal Oak (right of upper centre)

=== The station ===
When the Great Western Railway (GWR) main line was first opened in June 1838, the first stop out of Paddington was at West Drayton, 13 miles 18 chains (21.28 km) from Paddington. Intermediate stations were opened over the years, and the first stop became progressively closer to Paddington: a station at Ealing Broadway (5 miles 58 chains (9.21 km) from Paddington) was opened in December 1838, and one at Acton Main Line (4 miles 19 chains (6.82 km) from Paddington) in 1868. In the meantime, the Hammersmith and City Railway had opened from Green Lane Junction (near the present Westbourne Park) to Hammersmith on 13 June 1864, with the first stop on that route originally at Ladbroke Grove, 1 mile 61 chains (2.84 km) out, although one opened at Westbourne Park (1 mile 22 chains (2.05 km) out) in 1866.

An agreement between the GWR and the Metropolitan Railway (who had co-owned the Hammersmith & City with the GWR since 1867) came into force on 1 July 1868, although it did not become legal until the following year. Under the agreement, various improvements were to be made; these included the provision of a station at Royal Oak, and the reconstruction of Westbourne Park. On 30 October 1871 the station at Royal Oak opened, 53 chains (1.07 km) out; it was situated between Ranelagh Bridge and Lord Hill's Bridge, and access was from the latter. As originally built, it had three platform faces; one for down trains and two, each side of an island, for up trains. It was served by both main line and Hammersmith & City trains, and, for over sixty years, this was the first stop out of Paddington for main line trains; it remains the first stop for Hammersmith & City services. The station was hit during the 1940-41 blitz, with track, the platform and a nearby main-line train taking bomb damage.

During the quadrupling of the Great Western Main Line (GWML) in 1878, a dive-under, known as Subway Tunnel, was constructed between Royal Oak and Westbourne Park. This was for Hammersmith & City services, allowing them to cross the main line without interfering with the flow of traffic; it was brought into use on 12 May 1878. To accommodate the additional track of the main line, it was necessary to reduce Royal Oak station to two platform faces; the former down platform was removed (its track becoming the up main), and the southern of the two former up platforms became the down platform.

Trains along the GWML ceased to call at Royal Oak from 1 October 1934, but the Hammersmith & City service remained. Ownership of the station was not transferred to London Transport until 1 January 1970. The first GWML stop out of Paddington is now Acton Main Line.

=== Ranelagh Bridge depot ===
There had been a locomotive depot at Westbourne Park since 1855, which was replaced by the Old Oak Common depot in 1906. To avoid the need for locomotives to make the 6-mile (9.7 km) round trip from Paddington just to be turned, coaled and watered, a small maintenance facility for locomotives was constructed on the southern side of the line, directly opposite Royal Oak station, which occupied part of the site of Westbourne Lodge and its grounds. It was known as Ranelagh Bridge depot, and opened in 1907. There was a turntable, a water tower, a coaling stage and sidings where about 15 locomotives could be held awaiting their next trip west. The turntable was removed in April 1964, and the depot facilities were altered to suit Diesel locomotives; the depot closed in 1980.

=== Coach station proposal ===
At the end of 2018 residents became aware that Royal Oak was under consideration as a possible location for a new coach station to replace Victoria Coach Station, to be built on land north of the station (previously used for soil handling machinery used in construction of the nearby Crossrail tunnels). This was strongly opposed by Westminster's main political parties, given the limited capacity of Royal Oak tube station and other local transport links, and the predominantly residential nature of the area. No firm details were published by Transport for London, but opponents of the scheme claimed that Royal Oak was the preferred site, that the scheme would occupy a 10,000 sq m site stretching from Lord's Hill Bridge (Royal Oak) to Westbourne Terrace, that a road bridge crossing the area would be closed and removed, and (in letters sent to local residents) that the tube station would have to be closed for an extended period while construction was in progress, since the coach station proposal included step-free access to the platform. On 13 March 2019 the Mayor of London informed local groups that use of the site had been considered but it was not a viable site for this purpose and TfL would not take their plans forward. The Mayor has subsequently told the London Assembly that the area of land may instead be used for other purposes such as sustainable housing and improvements to accessibility at the station.

== In popular culture ==
- Lord Hills Bridge is mentioned in the song "Nature Springs" on the album The Good, the Bad & the Queen.

== Connections ==
The station is served by London Buses day and night routes.

== Bibliography ==
- Baker, S. K. (April 2007) [1977]. Rail Atlas Great Britain & Ireland (11th ed.). Hersham: Oxford Publishing Co. ISBN 978-0-86093-602-2. 0704/K.
- Butt, R. V. J. (1995). The Directory of Railway Stations. Yeovil: Patrick Stephens Ltd. ISBN 1-85260-508-1. R508.
- Croome, Desmond F. (2003). The Circle Line: An Illustrated History. Harrow Weald: Capital Transport. ISBN 1-85414-267-4.
- Harris, Cyril M. (2006) [1977]. What's in a name? (4th ed.). Harrow Weald: Capital Transport. ISBN 1-85414-241-0.
- Lyons, E. T. (1974) [1972]. An Historical Survey of Great Western Engine Sheds 1947. Headington: Oxford Publishing Co. ISBN 0-902888-16-1.
- MacDermot, E. T. (1927). History of the Great Western Railway, vol. I: 1833–1863. Paddington: Great Western Railway.
- MacDermot, E. T. (1931). History of the Great Western Railway, vol. II: 1863–1921. Paddington: Great Western Railway.
- Mitchell, Vic; Smith, Keith (January 2000). Paddington to Ealing. Western Main Lines. Midhurst: Middleton Press. ISBN 1-901706-37-0.
- Mitchell, Vic; Smith, Keith (April 2002). Paddington to Princes Risborough. Western Main Lines. Midhurst: Middleton Press. ISBN 1-901706-81-8.
- Peacock, Thomas B. (1970) [1968]. Great Western London Suburban Services. Locomotion Papers (2nd ed.). Oakwood Press. LP48.

Preceding station	London Underground	Following station
Westbourne Park towards Hammersmith	Circle line	Paddington towards Edgware Road via Aldgate
Westbourne Park towards Hammersmith	Hammersmith & City line	Paddington towards Barking
Historical railways
Westbourne Park towards Hammersmith	Metropolitan line Hammersmith branch (1864–1990)	Paddington Terminus
Preceding station	National Rail	Following station
Westbourne Park; Line and station open	Great Western Railway; Great Western Main Line	London Paddington; Line and station open
