= A40 road in London =

Major trunk road connecting London to Fishguard, Wales

Coordinates: 51.5153°N 0.0983°W

A40

Route information
- History: Constructed 1920s–1992

Major junctions
- East end: City of London
- A1 A201; A4 A5200 A4200 A401 A400 A4201; A41 A4202 A402; A5 A501 A404 A3220 A219 A4000 A406 A4127 A312 A4180 A437 M40
- West end: Denham Roundabout

Location
- Country: United Kingdom
- Constituent country: England
- Primary destinations: M40; M25

Road network
- Roads in the United Kingdom; Motorways; A and B road zones

In London, the A40 forms a major trunk road starting in the City of London, and passing through six London Boroughs: Camden, Westminster, Kensington & Chelsea, Hammersmith & Fulham, Ealing and Hillingdon, to meet the M40 motorway junction 1 at Denham, Buckinghamshire. Outside London, the road then continues onwards to Fishguard, Wales.

The road has been re-routed several times in the last 100 years – part of the route of the London section of the A40 was laid out in the 1920s and 1930s when Western Avenue was built – now most of it is grade-separated, dual carriageway (divided highway). In the 1960s Westway was constructed, easing traffic access to and from the centre of the city. The A40 links the City of London and the West End to the M40 motorway and M25 motorway. The route is called The London to Fishguard Trunk Road (A40) in legal documents and acts.

== City of London – City of Westminster ==
The A40 officially starts where St. Martin's Le Grand meets Cheapside. Here it shares a terminus with the A1, the main north London radial. First forming Newgate Street and then through Holborn to Holborn Viaduct. This viaduct carries the A40 over the A201 (leading to Blackfriars Bridge) and on to Holborn Circus where the A40 crosses the terminus of the A4. The A40 here is named High Holborn. One of the four Inns of Court, Gray's Inn, is on the north side of the road. Another, Lincoln's Inn, is on the south side. The road is now in the Borough of Camden. Leaving Holborn, the A40 crosses into the City of Westminster, forming New Oxford Street. The British Museum is close at this point. After crossing the southern end of Tottenham Court Road (the A400) at St Giles Circus, the A40 becomes Oxford Street.

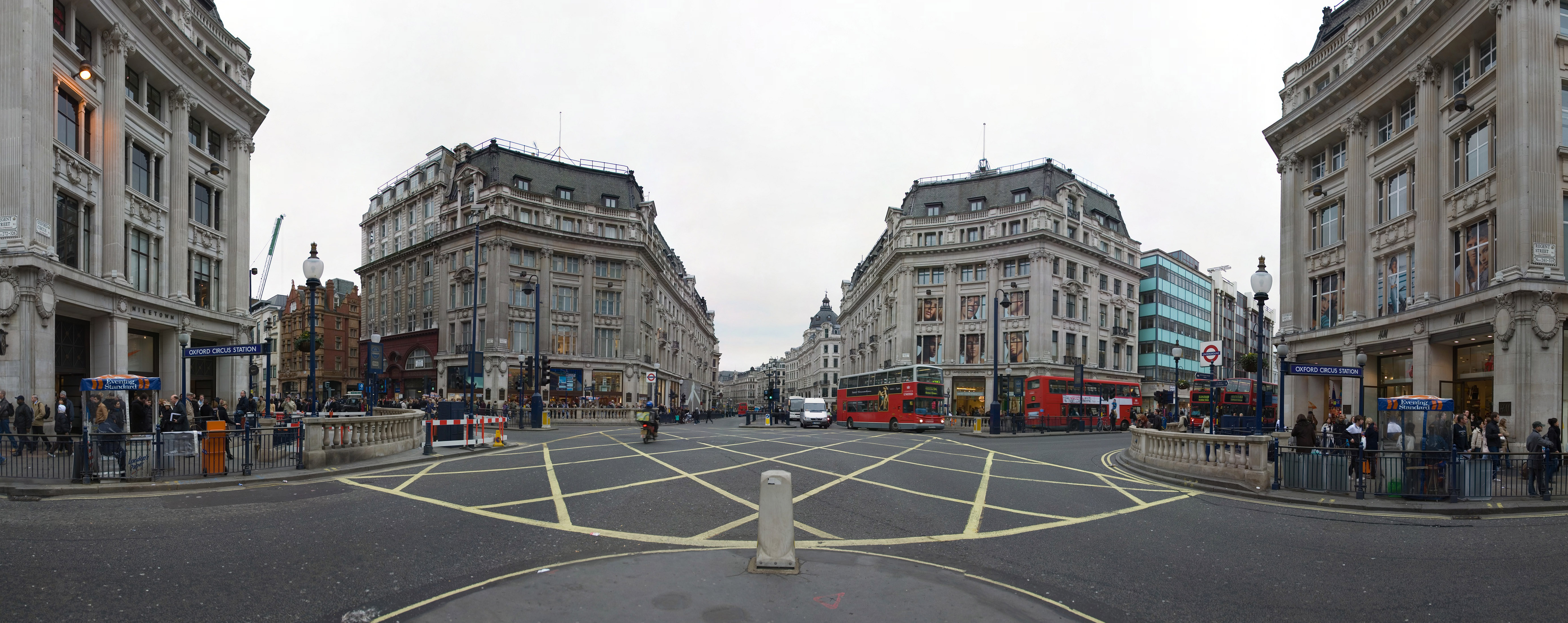
Oxford Circus – as it was in March 2006 – looking down Regent Street which crosses Oxford Street. Under Oxford Circus is one of the busiest of London's underground stations. The Central, Bakerloo and Victoria lines all meet here. The Circus was constructed in the beginning of the 19th century, and was designed by John Nash

Oxford Street is Europe's busiest shopping street. Many chain stores have their flagship store on the street, including John Lewis, Debenhams, Marks and Spencers, House of Fraser and Selfridges. There are several tube stations along the road: the Central line runs under Oxford Street and is London Underground's second busiest line with 180 million passengers a year. The busiest stations are Tottenham Court Road, Oxford Circus, and Bond Street, which provide access to five tube lines. The road forms the northern boundary of Soho; the main theatres and cinemas are located to the south near Leicester Square. The area contains a large number of clubs, bars and music venues; Wigmore Hall on Wigmore Street is a notable example. Centre Point was one of London's first skyscrapers. The A40 continues as Oxford Street to Marble Arch at the north-east corner of Hyde Park. Nearby is Speakers' Corner, where people are generally allowed considerable freedom of speech, although the police occasionally intervene. Nearby is the site of Tyburn gallows, where public executions took place from 1388 to 1793. At Marble Arch is a major road junction of Oxford Street, Park Lane (A4202), Bayswater Road (A402) and Edgware Road (A5). The A40 has taken three courses from here over the last thirty years. The last change was in 2000, when Westway lost its motorway status (A40(M)) and became the A40.

Now that Westway is part of the A40, the road no longer follows its western route from the Marble Arch roundabout. To continue on the A40 from Oxford Street, turn northwards into Portman Street (A41) – which continues as Gloucester Place – to join the London Inner Ring Road to the west of Baker Street Underground station. Turning left onto the A501 (Marylebone Road) links with the Marylebone Flyover and the start of Westway.

== Westway ==
Westway is a 3.5-mile (5.6 km) long, elevated dual carriageway section of the A40 in west London. It runs from Paddington to North Kensington. It was constructed between 1964 and 1970 to relieve congestion at Shepherd's Bush, with traffic from Western Avenue struggling to enter central London along too narrow roads. Opening in July 1970, Westway was designated A40(M). Retaining its hard shoulders and including both four-lane and six-lane sections, it still resembles a motorway. In 2000, when responsibility for trunk roads in Greater London was transferred from the Highways Agency to the Greater London Authority, Westway lost its motorway status.

The construction of Westway caused major disruption, with the demolition of houses and roads. When opened it was the largest continuous concrete structure in Britain.

=== Route ===
Westway starts from the Marylebone Flyover. Here the Marylebone Road (A501) – part of the northern section of the London Inner Ring Road – crosses the Edgware Road (A5) and continues as the A40. It runs close to the Great Western Main Line out of Paddington to join Western Avenue.

Between the Marylebone Flyover and Westway, a 100-metre section of surface-level road allows westbound traffic from the Marylebone Flyover to exit towards the Harrow Road (A404) and eastbound traffic from the Harrow Road to access the Flyover. Eastbound traffic from the Westway cannot exit here to reach the Edgware Road and must continue ahead to the Marylebone Flyover.

After passing Paddington Basin and Paddington station and crossing the Paddington branch of the Grand Union Canal, Westway follows the Hammersmith & City line through North Kensington and Westbourne Green passing three London Underground stations (Royal Oak, Westbourne Park and Ladbroke Grove) before flowing into Western Avenue.

== Background ==
Leaving Marble Arch, the A40 continued along Bayswater Road and Holland Park Avenue (now the A402) running through Notting Hill Gate to Shepherd's Bush. Before Western Avenue was proposed and completed, the A40 continued along the Uxbridge Road (the present A4020) passing through Ealing, Southall, Uxbridge and Denham, Buckinghamshire. Still busy, the Uxbridge Road was redesignated the A4020, when Western Avenue was changed from being the A403, and the A40 route changed accordingly,

From Shepherd's Bush, the A40 moved northbound along Wood Lane – near the BBC Television Centre – to join Western Avenue adjacent to a roundabout with the M41, now the A3220, also referred to as the West Cross Route. The M41 and the A40(M) were downgraded to the A3220 and A40 at the same time in 2000.

== Western Avenue ==
Starting at the junction with Old Oak Common Lane and Old Oak Road, East Acton, Western Avenue is approximately 10 miles (16 km) long. This junction is traffic light controlled, but its name 'Savoy Circus' recalls the roundabout which once formed the junction. From this point the A40 swings in a north-westerly direction towards North Acton, crosses the Great Western Main Line, and the final traffic light controlled junction known as 'Gypsy Corner' (A4000), to arrive at the Hanger Lane Gyratory System to connect with the A406 and A4005. The A40 passes under the gyratory system in a tunnel.

== Denham Roundabout ==
The Denham Roundabout is where Western Avenue – A40 – flows into the M40 motorway. The roundabout below provides a connection with the westbound continuation of the A40, together with the intersection of the road from Uxbridge (A4020) and the road from Slough to Watford (A412).

When the M40 from Denham to High Wycombe was built, Western Avenue was extended at high level to make an end-on join with the motorway, and a larger roundabout was built below the bridges carrying the motorway. When first laid out, the roundabout had the traffic going round it clockwise in the usual way, but as traffic volumes built up the layout was altered – so that the traffic moved round the roundabout in both directions – making it almost a ring road with mini-roundabouts at the points where other roads join the main roundabout.

== Gallery ==
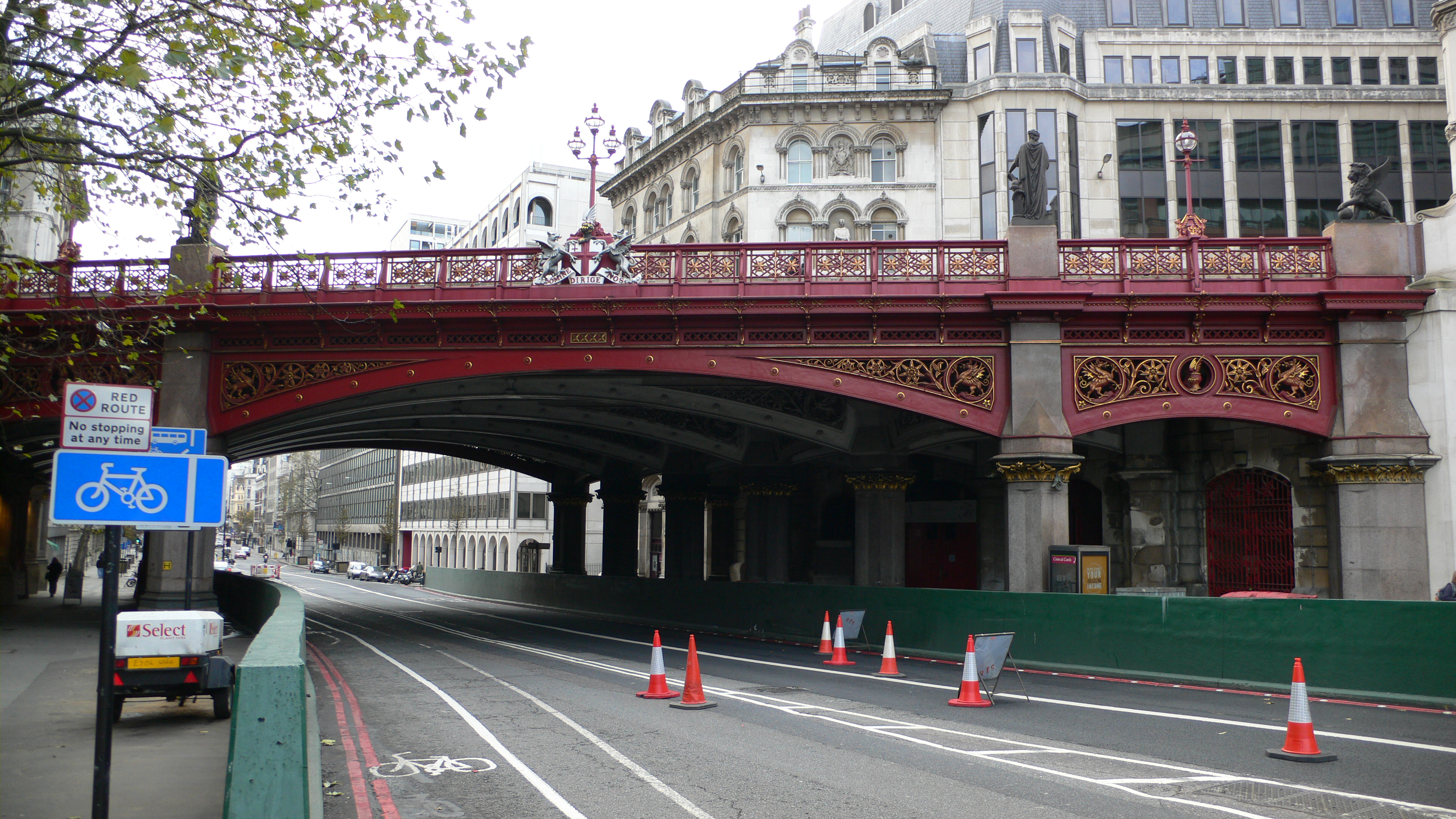
Holborn Viaduct carries the A40

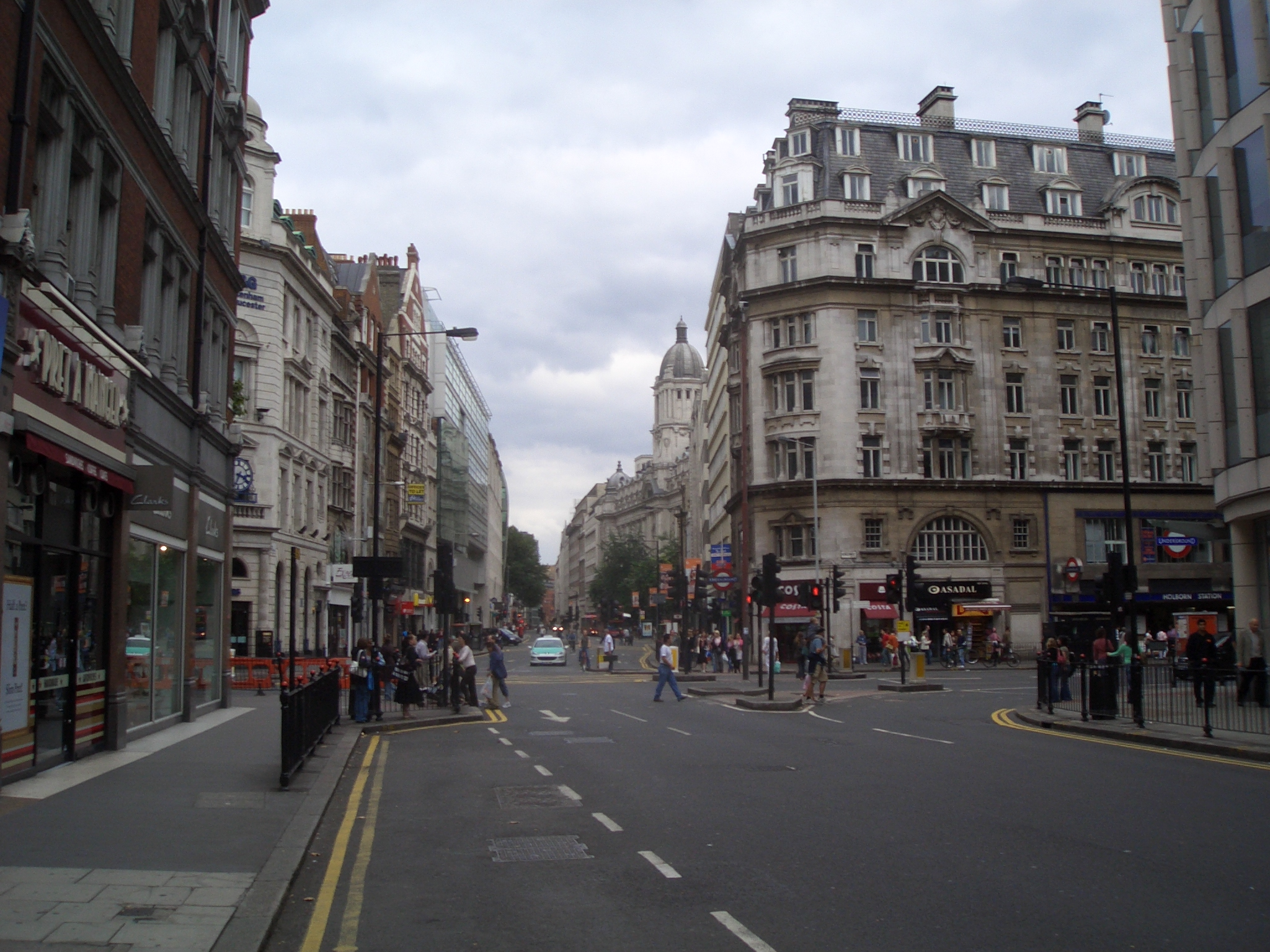
High Holborn, Holborn

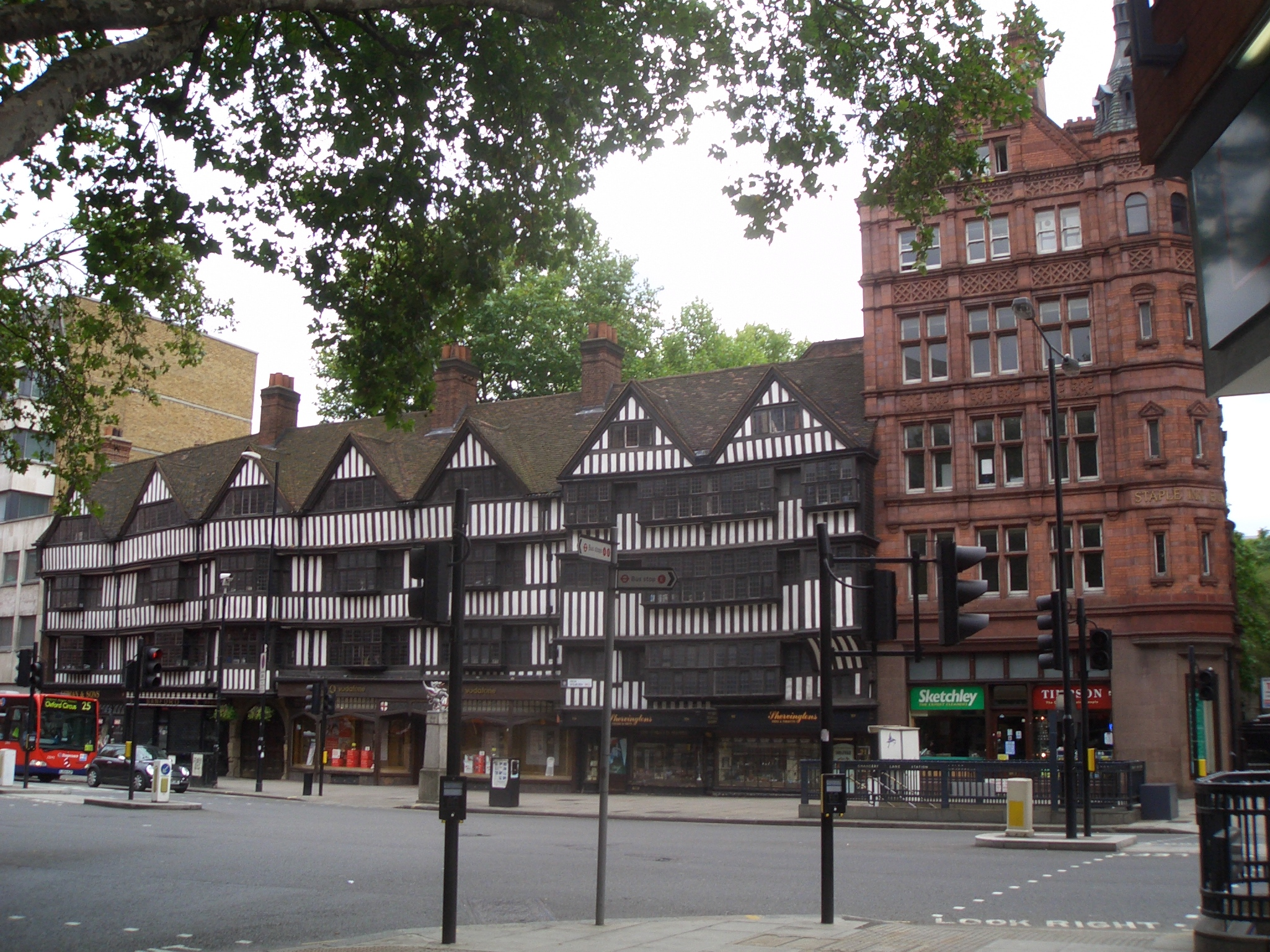
Staple Inn, with its distinctive timber-framed façade, on the south side of High Holborn

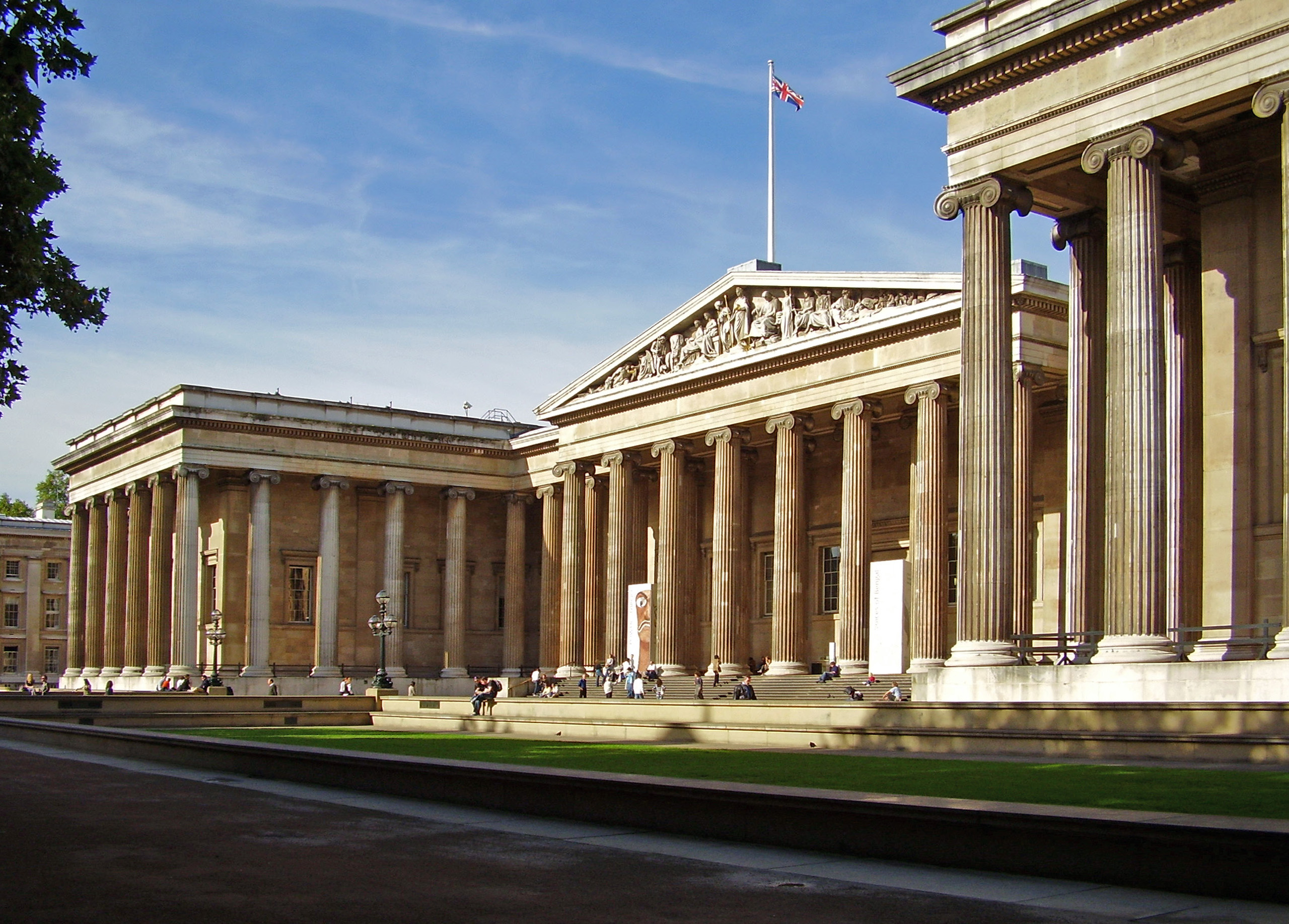
The British Museum is just to the north of the A40

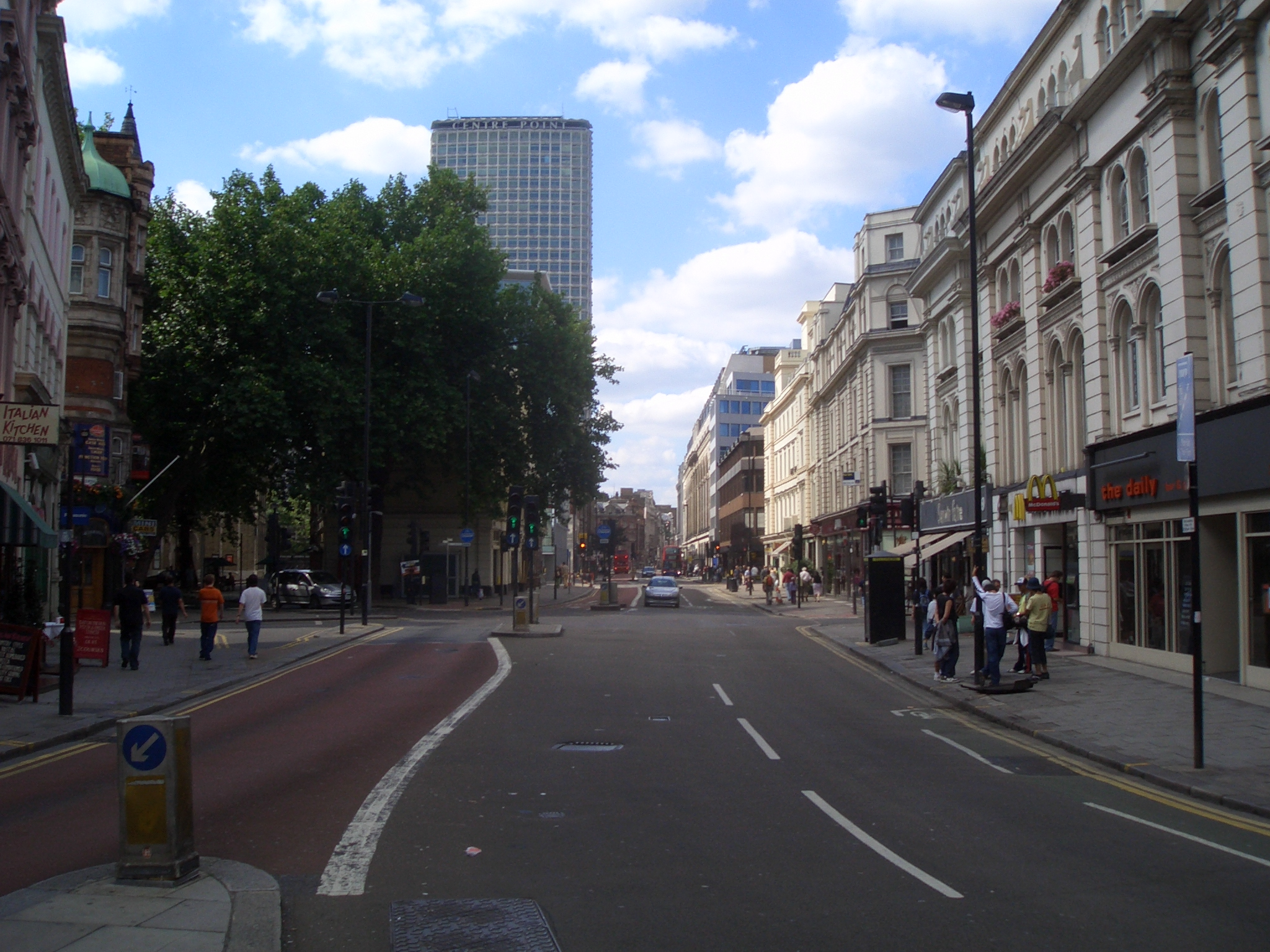
New Oxford Street

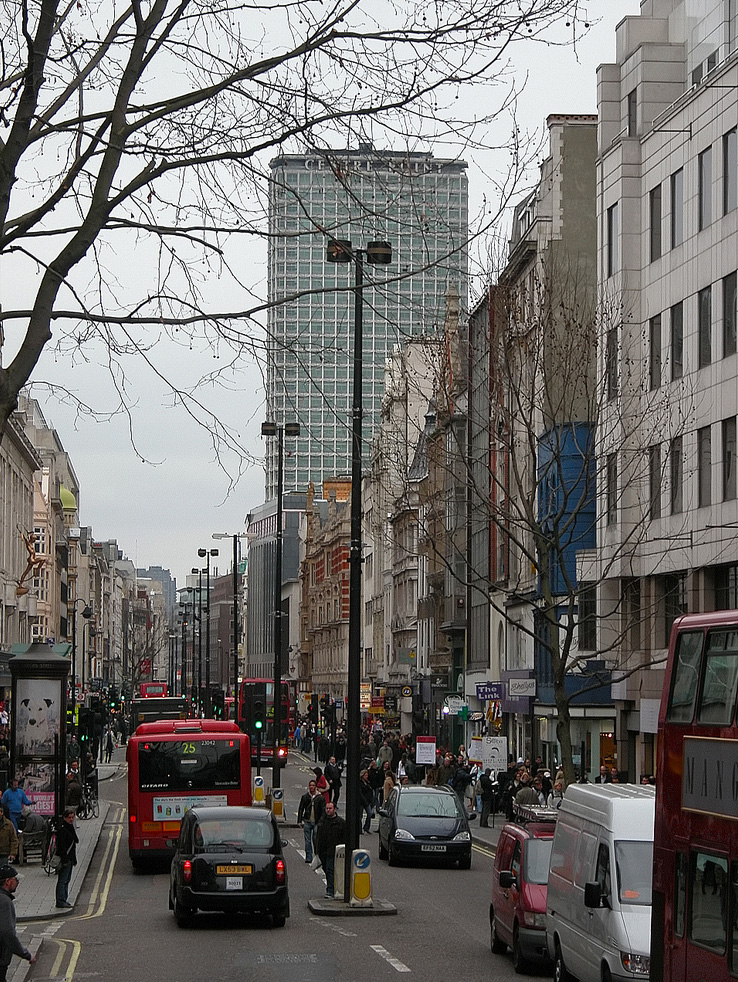
Oxford Street, with Centre Point in the background

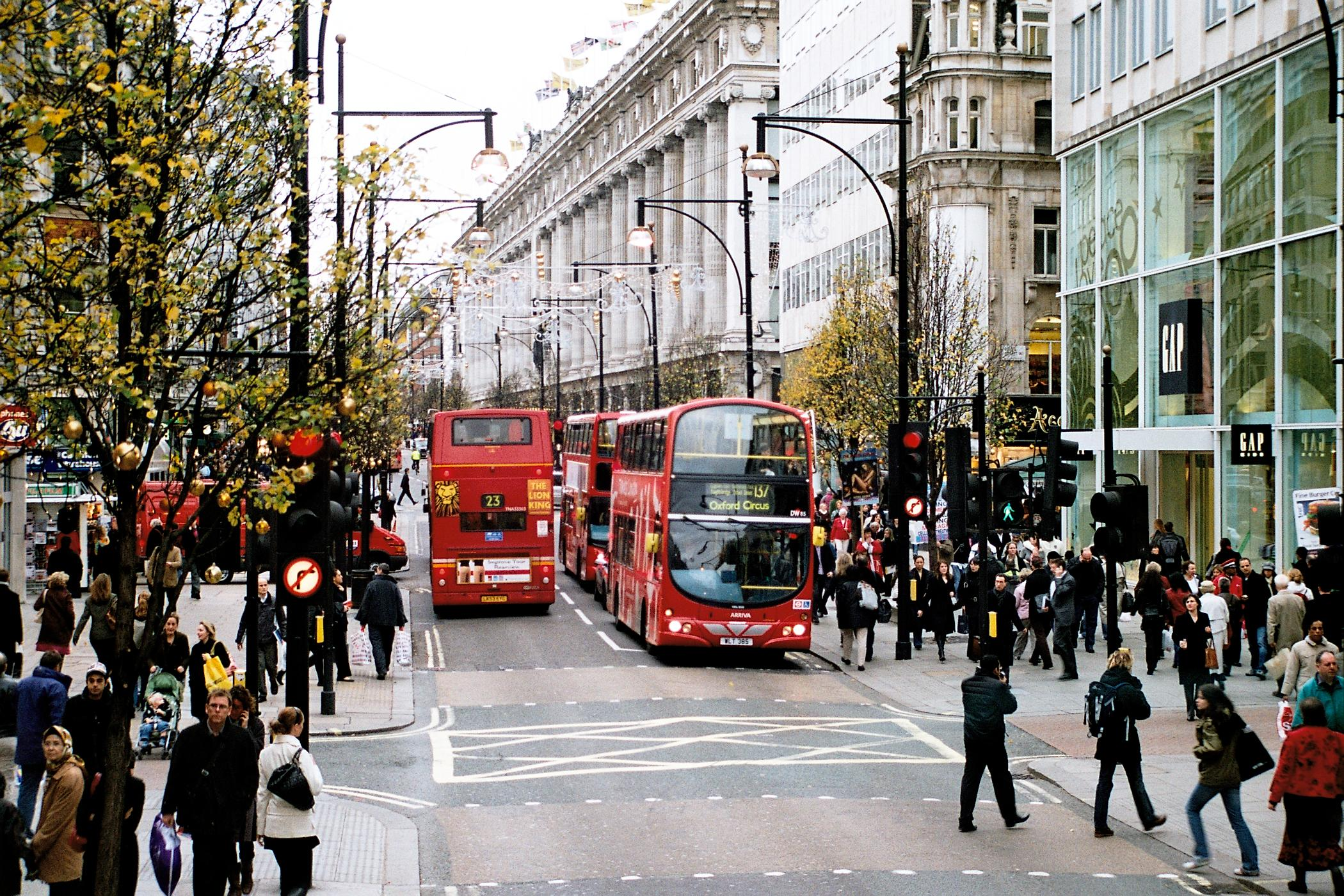
The view west along Oxford Street in December 2006, showing Selfridges department store in the background

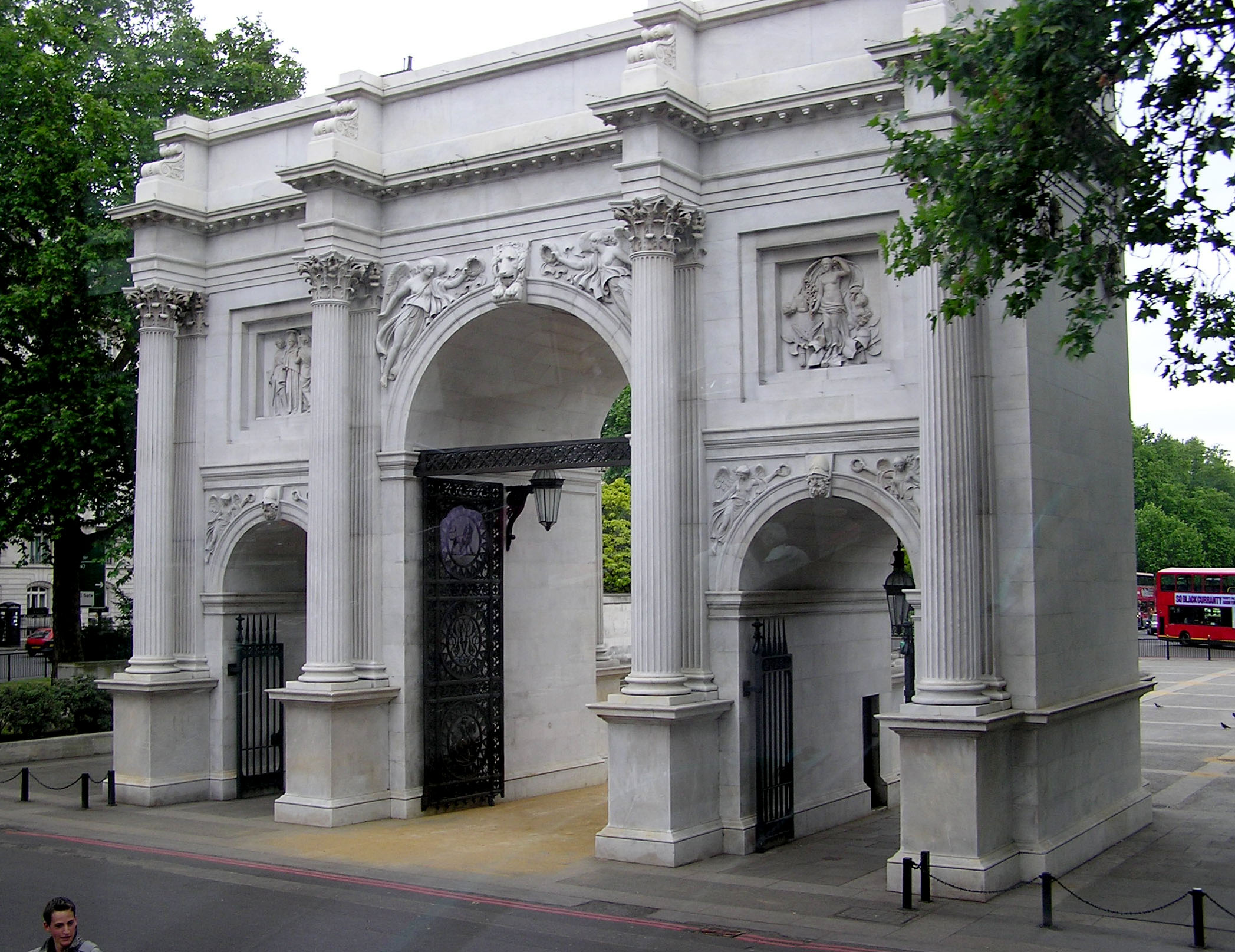
Marble Arch

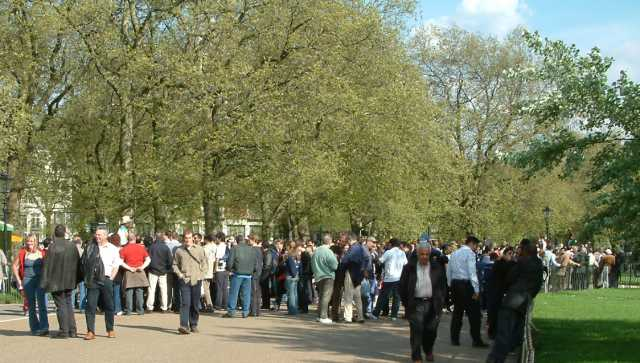
Speakers' Corner, Hyde Park

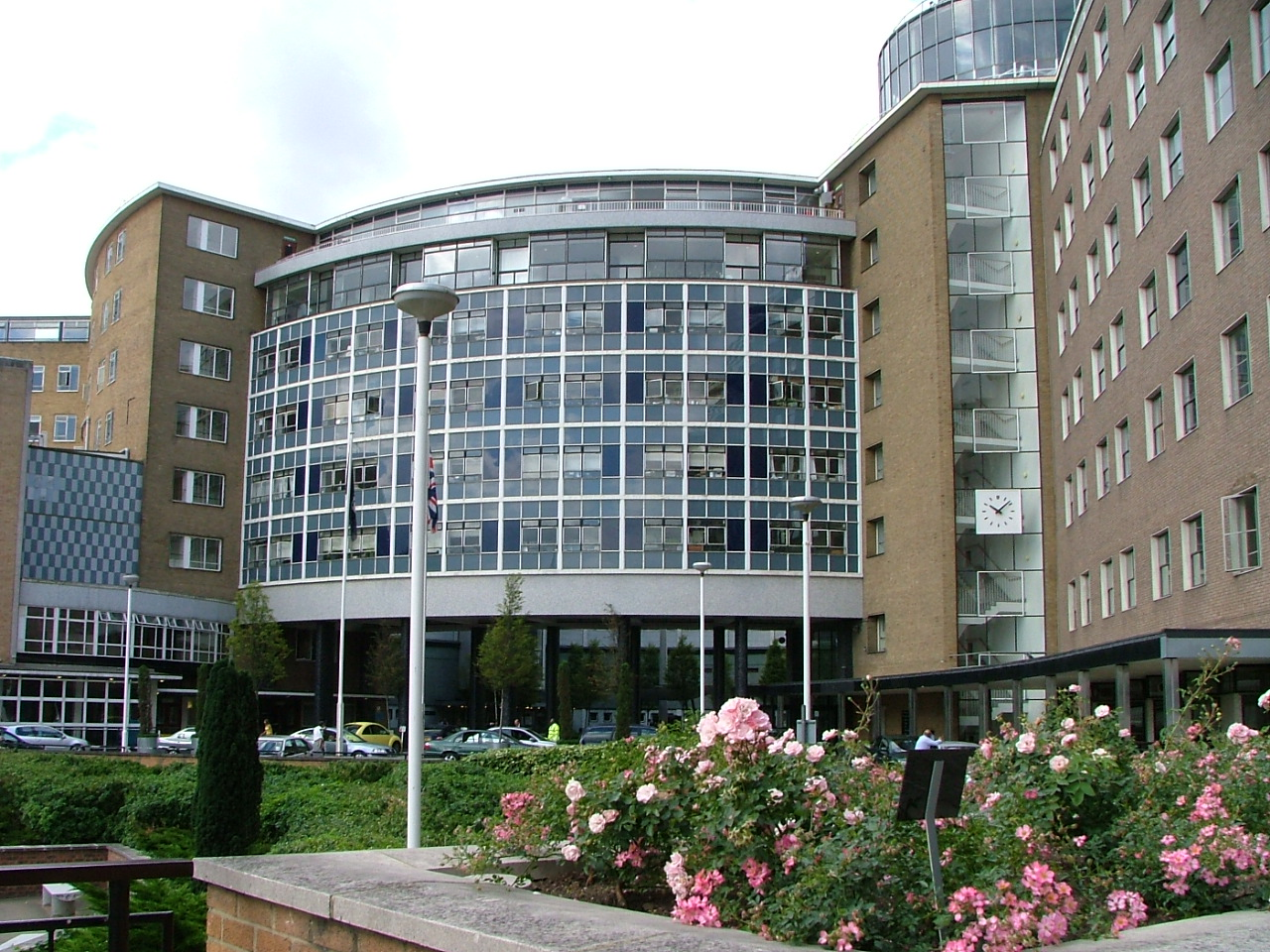
BBC Television Centre, White City

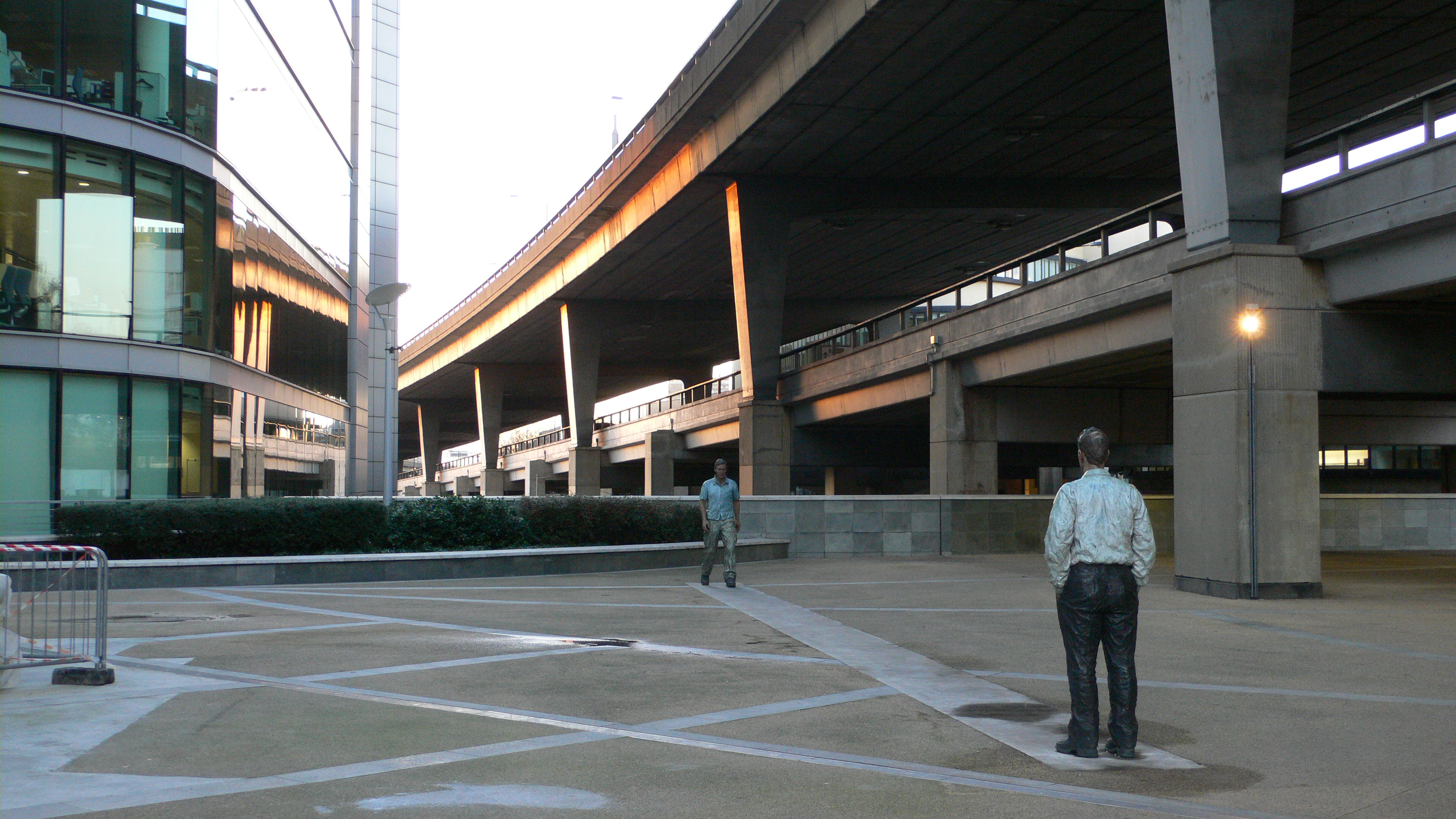
Westway at Paddington

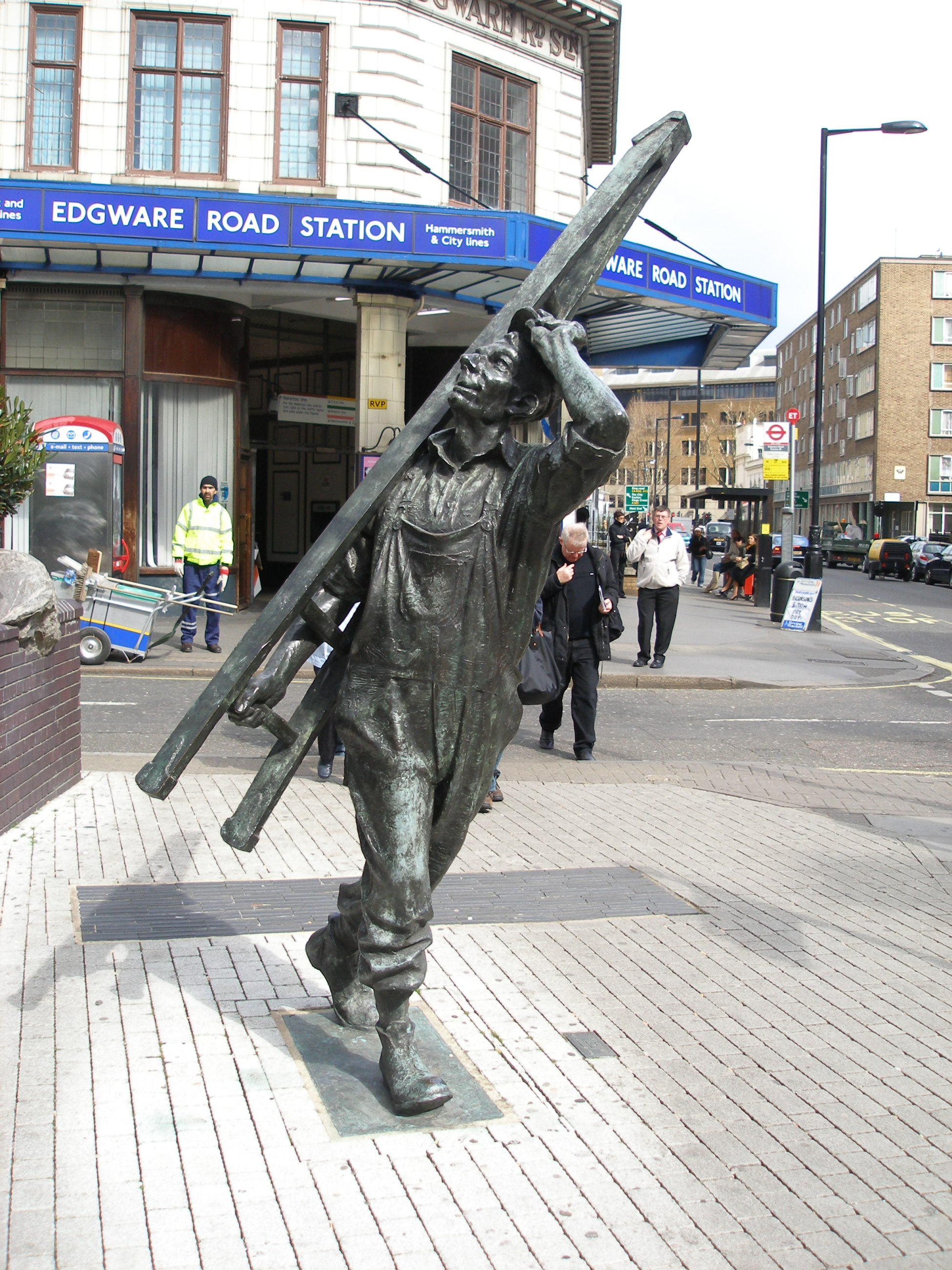
Sculpture "The Window Cleaner" by Allan Sly outside the Edgware Road London Underground station

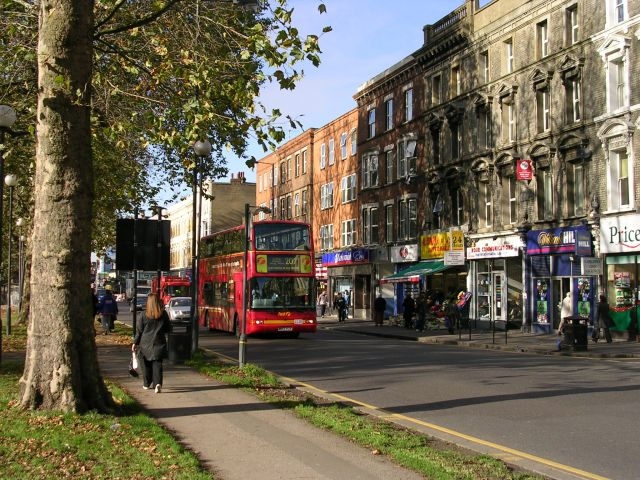
Uxbridge Road on the north side of the Green, Shepherd's Bush, formerly A40

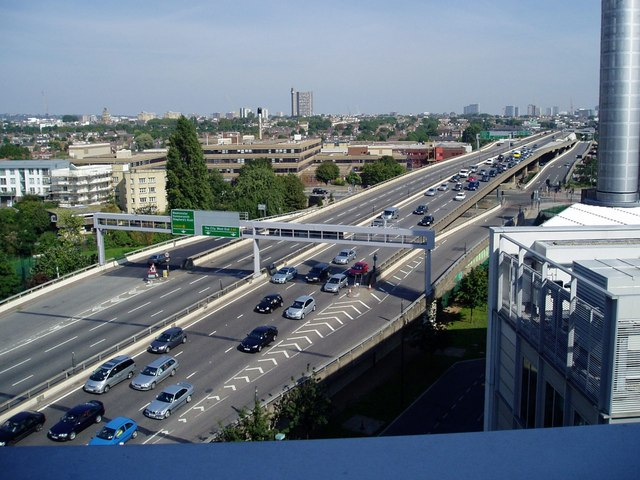
Westway flyover junction at Ladbroke Grove, looking east

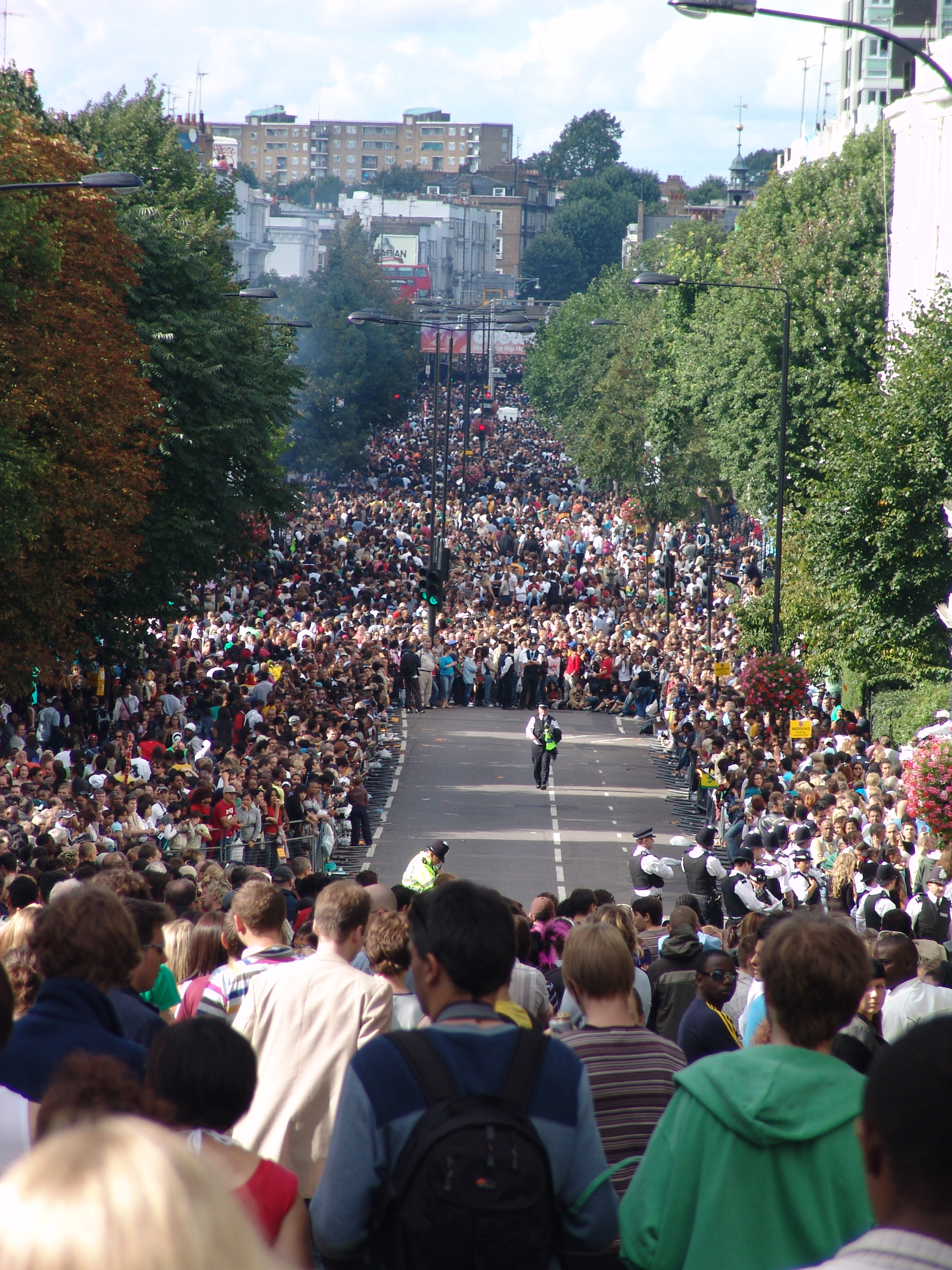
Crowds on Ladbroke Grove during the Notting Hill Carnival

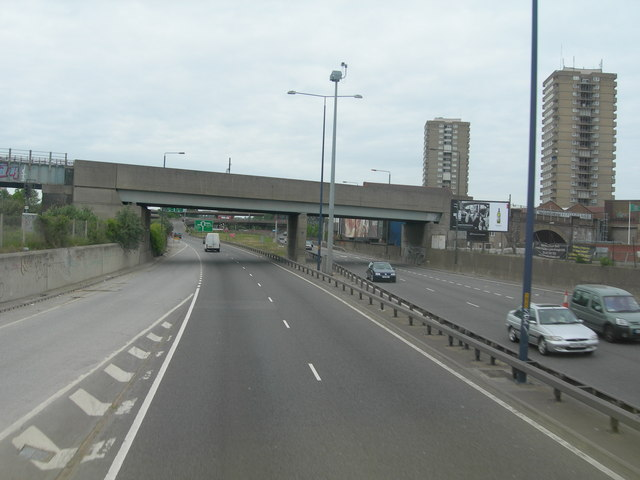
West Cross Route, looking north towards Westway

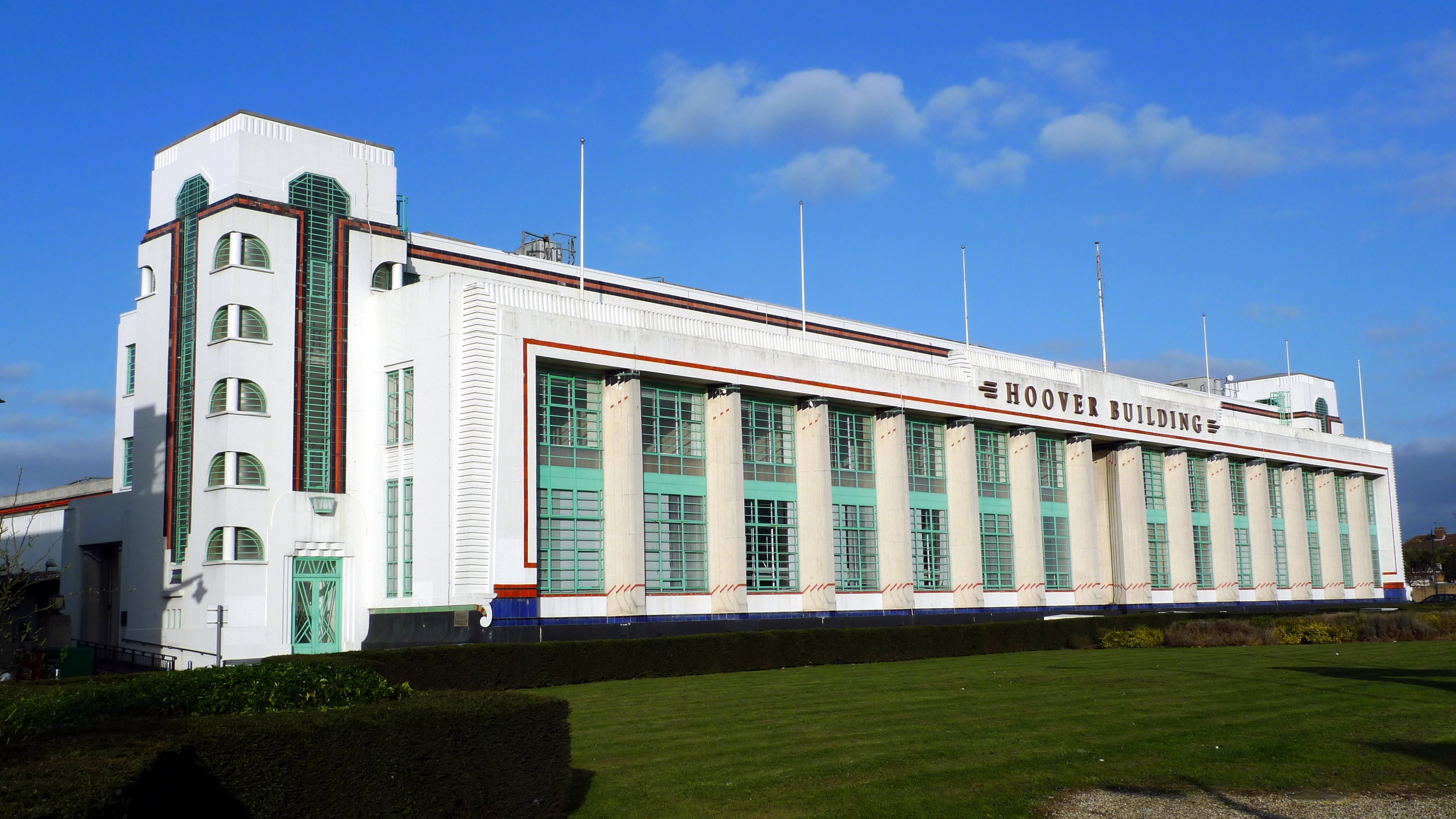
The Hoover Building on Western Avenue in Perivale is an example of Art Deco architecture designed by Wallis, Gilbert and Partners (1932–38)

== Part of a larger plan ==
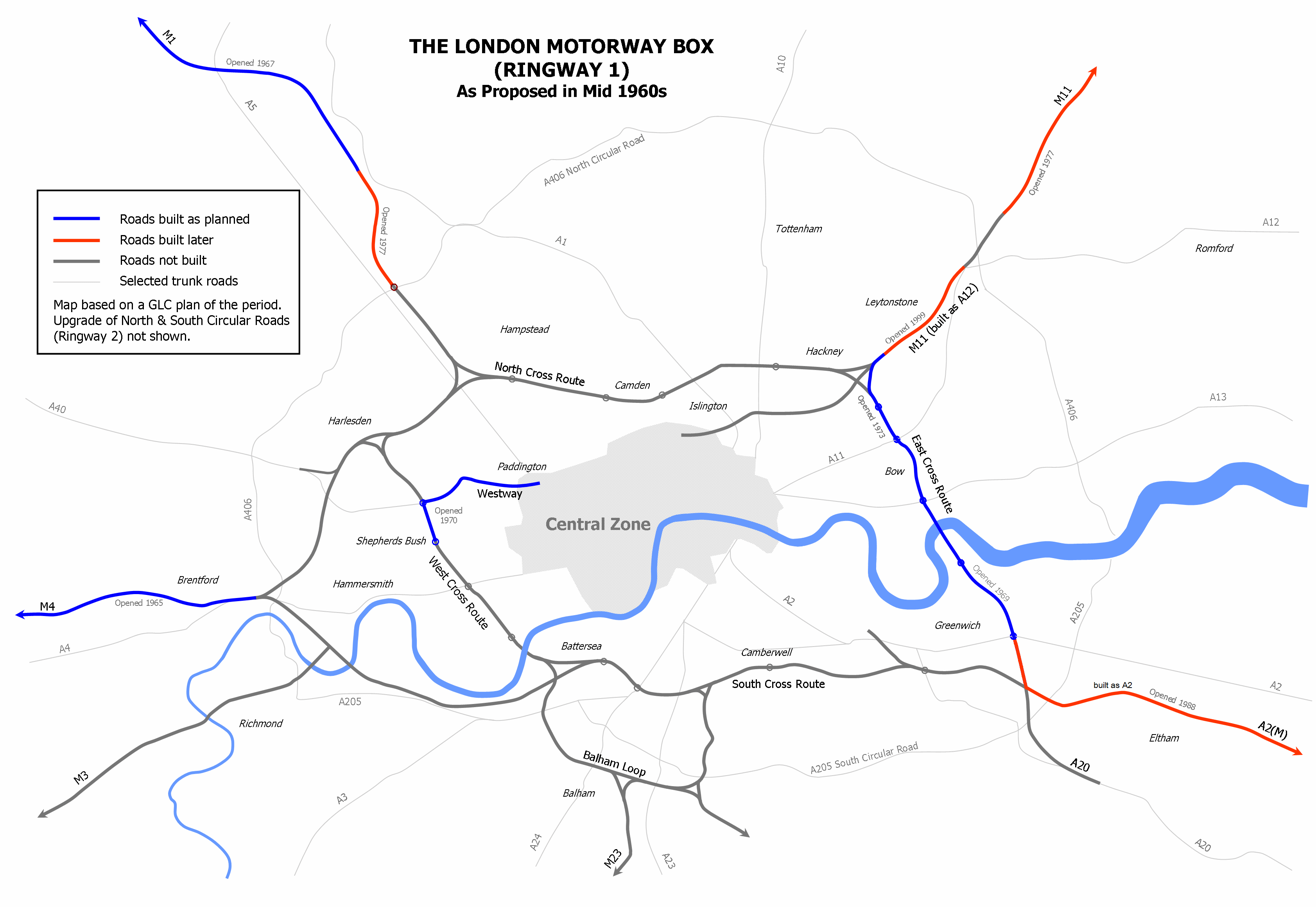
Plan of the London Motorway Box scheme from mid-1960s showing the West Cross Route as built and as planned

The West Cross Route in The Royal Borough of Kensington and Chelsea and the Hammersmith and Fulham borough, was formerly the M41 motorway, part of the innermost circuit of the London Ringways network – a complex and comprehensive plan for a network of high-speed roads circling central London. Designed to manage and control the flow of traffic within the capital, the road would have run from Battersea to Harlesden and would have paralleled the National Rail West London Line as an elevated road. Opening in 1970, together with Westway, it runs north–south between the northern elevated roundabout junction with the western end of the Westway (A40) and the southern Holland Park Roundabout.

In 2000 its status was downgraded to an A-road – a short, 0.75 miles (1.21 km) dual carriageway section of the A3220.

=== Westfield ===
A grade-separated junction was built approximately halfway along this section of the A3220 in 2008 to connect to the Westfield London shopping development. This shopping precinct in White City (London Borough of Hammersmith and Fulham) is on a site bounded by the West Cross Route, Westway and Wood Lane (A219), and opened on 30 October 2008.
