= Paddington tube station (Circle and Hammersmith & City lines) =

London Underground station

Paddington
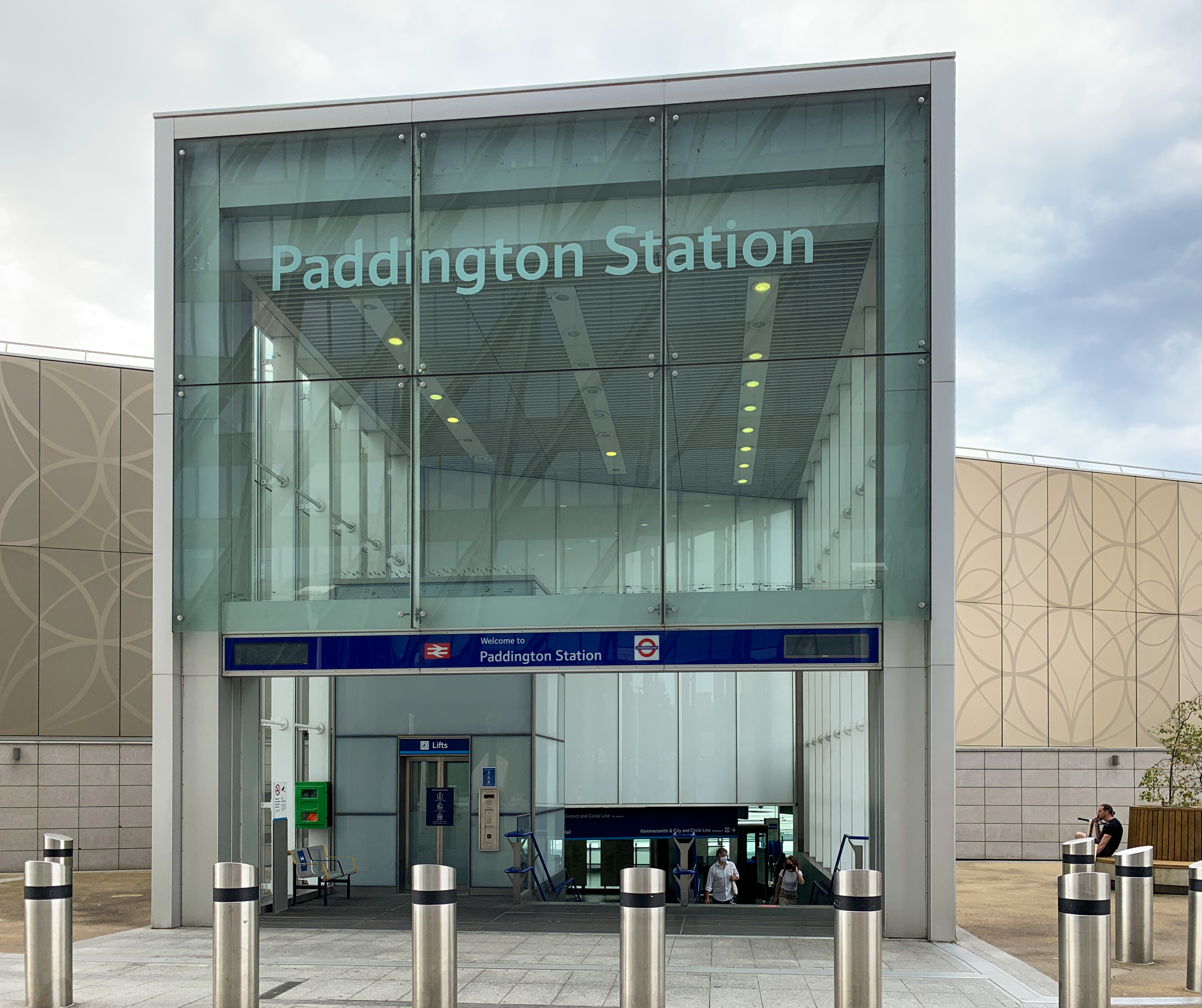
- Entrance from Paddington Basin
- Interactive map of Paddington

General information
- Location: Paddington
- Local authority: City of Westminster
- Managed by: London Underground
- Number of platforms: 2
- Accessible: Yes
- Fare zone: 1
- OSI: Paddington; Paddington Bakerloo, Circle and District lines station

London Underground annual entry and exit
- 2021: ▲20.44 million
- 2022: ▲46.65 million
- 2023: ▲48.55 million
- 2024: ▲54.01 million
- 2025: ▲57.97 million

Key dates
- 10 January 1863: Opened (as terminus)
- 13 June 1864: Extension (to Hammersmith)
- 1 August 1872: Started ("Middle Circle")
- 31 January 1905: Ended ("Middle Circle")
- 30 July 1990: Started (Hammersmith & City)
- 13 December 2009: Started (Circle line to Hammersmith)

Other information
- External links: TfL station info page
- Coordinates: 51.5186°N 0.1785°W

Paddington (/ˈpædɪŋtən/) is a London Underground station in Paddington. It is located adjacent to the north side of Paddington mainline station and has entrances from within the mainline station and from Paddington Basin. The station is on the Circle and Hammersmith & City lines between Royal Oak and Edgware Road stations and is in London fare zone 1.

The station is one of two separate Underground stations of the same name. The other station, on Praed Street to the south of the mainline station, is served by the Bakerloo, Circle and District lines. Although shown on the London Underground map as a single station, the two stations are not directly linked and interchange between them is via the concourse of the mainline station.

== History ==
=== Metropolitan Railway ===
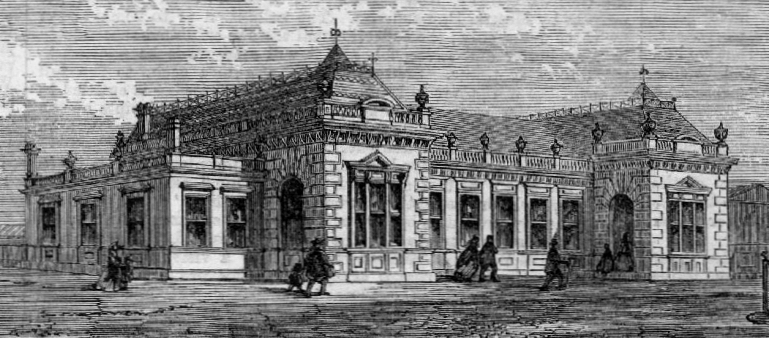
Exterior, 1862

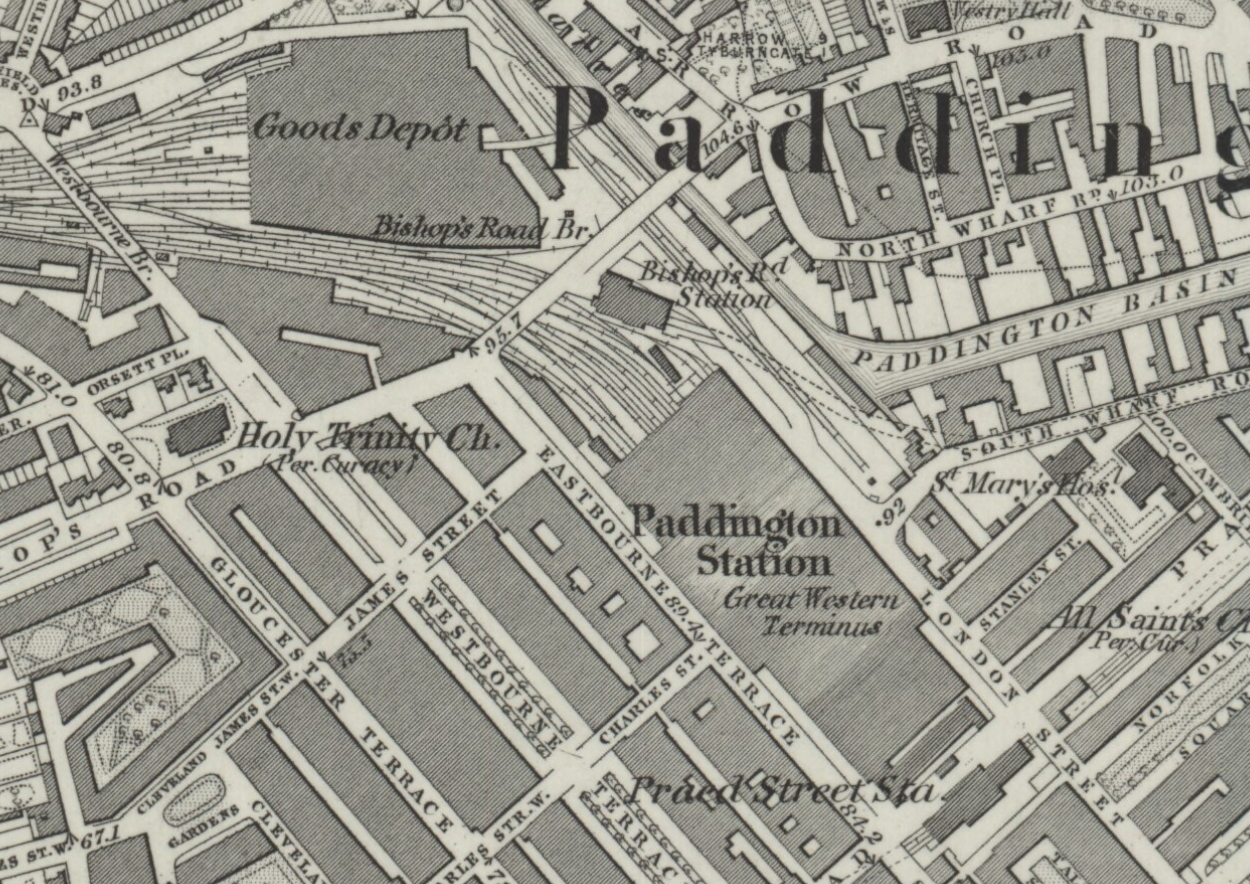
Metropolitan Railway station between Paddington GWR passenger and goods stations, 1874

The station was opened as Paddington (Bishop's Road) by the Metropolitan Railway (MR, later the Metropolitan line) on 10 January 1863 as the western terminus of the world's first underground railway. (Note: The Metropolitan Railway ran mostly in shallow tunnels constructed using the cut-and-cover technique under existing roads. Some sections of the trench were left un-roofed for ventilation. Some station platforms were below ground level within the roofed sections of tunnel but others, such as Paddington (Bishop's Road) had glazed roofs.) The station building was located on the road bridge carrying Bishop's Road (now Bishop's Bridge Road) over the mainline tracks of the Great Western Railway (GWR). (Note: The Metropolitan Railway's chief engineer was John Fowler.) Services were initially operated with rolling stock provided by the GWR, and the MR route to Farringdon was laid with dual-gauge track for both broad-gauge and standard-gauge trains. (Note: A falling out between the managers of the GWR and MR led to the GWR withdrawing its trains from the MR's use in August 1863, though it continued to operate its own suburban services over the MR's tracks. The MR hired standard gauge rolling stock from the Great Northern Railway and London & North Western Railway whilst it had its own constructed.)

On 9 May 1864, the boiler exploded on the engine of a train about to leave the station eastbound. (Note: The engine was one of those hired from the Great Northern Railway following the Metropolitan Railway's dispute with the Great Western Railway.) The driver and fireman, a member of staff on the platform and a passenger on a train arriving from the east were injured. The explosion threw fragments of the boiler up to 404 feet (123 m) away. The canopy and end screen of the station's roof, the side wall of the platform stairs and the carriage of the arriving train were all damaged.

On 13 June 1864, GWR services were extended westward when the Hammersmith & City Railway (H&CR) opened to Hammersmith. (Note: The Hammersmith & City Railway was promoted jointly by the GWR and MR, but established as a separate company. It was jointly controlled by the two companies from 1 July 1865.) MR services began operating to Hammersmith in 1865. Initially, trains ran for about 1 mile (1.6 km) on the GWR's mainline tracks between Paddington and the start of the Hammersmith branch, but delays on the mainline section led to a separate pair of parallel tracks for the Hammersmith service being constructed. These opened on 30 October 1871.

On 1 October 1868, the MR opened a south-west facing junction (Praed Street junction) approximately 350 yards (320 m) west of Edgware Road for a new branch to Gloucester Road. (Note: The branch to Gloucester Road met the District Railway there and, with later extensions of both lines towards the City of London eventually formed the Inner Circle (now the Circle line).) MR trains to Gloucester Road served a separate station named Paddington (Praed Street) south of the main-line station. Paddington (Bishop's Road) station was given its current name on 10 September 1933.

From 1 August 1872, the '"Middle Circle"' service also began operations through the station running from Moorgate then over the Hammersmith branch to Latimer Road then, via a now demolished link, to the West London Line to Addison Road and the District Railway (DR, later the District line) to Mansion House. The service was operated jointly by the GWR and the DR. The service ended on 31 January 1905.

Until 1990, services through the station were shown on maps as part of the MR and, later the Metropolitan line. They were separately identified as the Hammersmith & City line in 1990.

=== Circle line ===
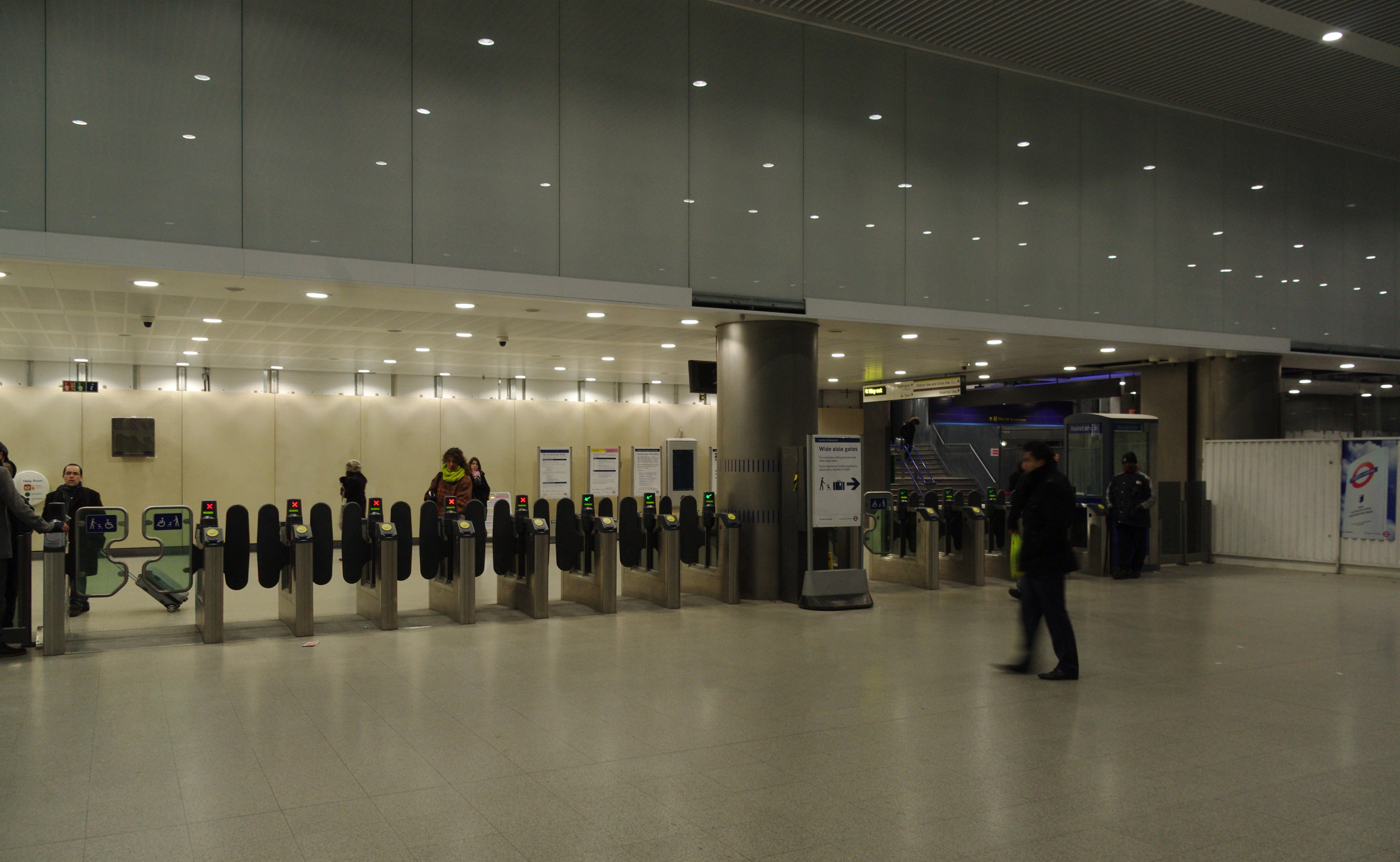
Entrance from the mainline station

In December 2009, Circle line services began serving the station. Originally operating as a loop-line using tracks constructed by the MR and the DR and serving only the station in Praed Street, the Circle line's route was altered to include the Hammersmith branch to increase train frequency on the branch and improve the regularity of Circle line trains. Trains run in a spiral anti-clockwise from Edgware Road around the loop, back to Edgware Road and then on to the Hammersmith branch. (Note: Although the two Paddington Underground stations are only about 400 metres (440 yd) apart geographically, the distance by rail on the Circle line without changing trains is 20.84 kilometres (12.95 mi) around almost the whole of the line's loop section.)

The station was rebuilt during 2012 and 2013 to provide longer platforms, improved access and connections to the mainline station. A new entrance to Paddington Basin was opened.

=== Accidents and incidents ===
On 9 May 1864, the boiler of a Great Northern Railway 0-6-0 locomotive exploded as it was leaving Bishops Road. Two people were seriously injured and the resulting debris landed up to 250 yards (230 m) away, and a section of the main station roof was dented.

== Services ==
The station is in London Fare Zone 1 between Royal Oak and Edgware Road stations. Train frequencies vary throughout the day, but, generally, Hammersmith & City line trains operate every 10 minutes from approximately 04:50 to 00:42 eastbound and 05:22 to 00:53 westbound; they are supplemented by Circle line trains every 10 minutes from approximately 04:58 to 23:43 eastbound and 06:40 to 00:45 westbound. Both lines use the same tracks.

Preceding station	London Underground	Following station
Royal Oak towards Hammersmith	Circle line	Edgware Road towards Edgware Road via Aldgate
Royal Oak towards Hammersmith	Hammersmith & City line	Edgware Road towards Barking
Former services
Royal Oak towards Hammersmith	Metropolitan line Hammersmith branch (1864–1990)	Edgware Road towards Barking

== Connections ==
London Buses routes serve Bishop's Bridge Road, north of the station. Other bus routes serve the station in Praed Street.
