= Acton Main Line railway station =

National Rail station in London, England

Acton Main Line
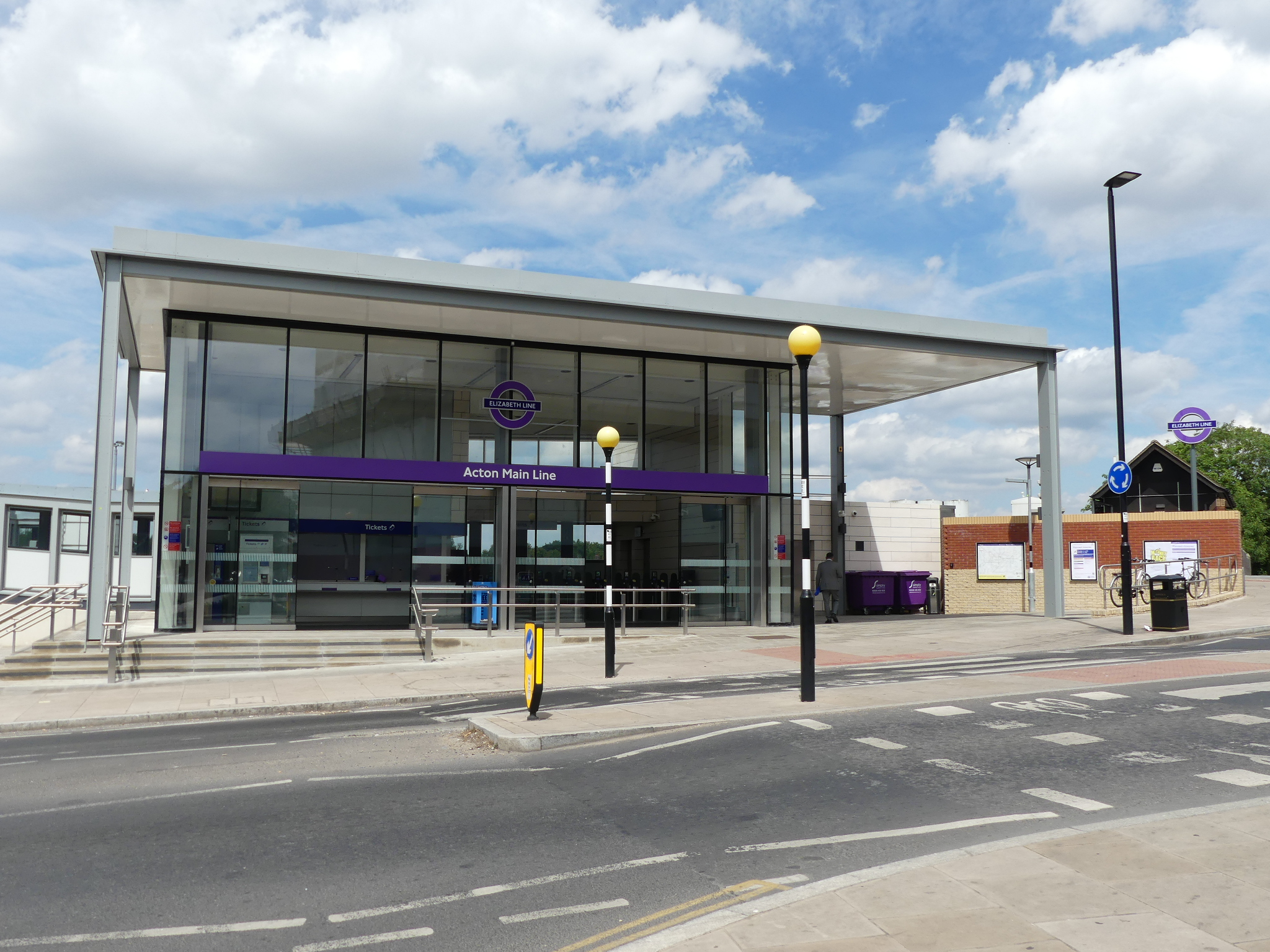
- Station entrance seen in July 2022
- Interactive map of Acton Main Line

General information
- Location: Acton
- Local authority: London Borough of Ealing
- Grid reference: TQ203812
- Managed by: Elizabeth line
- Owner: Network Rail
- Station code: AML
- DfT category: E
- Number of platforms: 3
- Tracks: 4
- Accessible: Yes
- Fare zone: 3

National Rail annual entry and exit
- 2020–21: ▼0.126 million
- 2021–22: ▲0.321 million
- 2022–23: ▲1.100 million
- 2023–24: ▲2.235 million
- 2024–25: ▲2.699 million

Railway companies
- Original company: Great Western Railway
- Pre-grouping: Great Western Railway
- Post-grouping: Great Western Railway

Key dates
- 1 February 1868: Opened as Acton
- 26 September 1949: Renamed Acton Main Line

Other information
- External links: Departures; Facilities
- Coordinates: 51.5171°N 0.2668°W

Acton Main Line is a railway station on the Great Western Main Line, in Acton, west London, England. Located 4 miles 21 chains (6.9 km) down the line from London Paddington, it lies between Paddington and Ealing Broadway stations. It is served and managed by the Elizabeth line, in London fare zone 3. The station was rebuilt with step-free access as part of the Crossrail project.

== History ==
The Great Western Main Line opened through Acton in 1838; however, the Great Western Railway (GWR) was initially focused on long distance traffic. The station was opened by the GWR on 1 February 1868. Originally simply named Acton, it was operated by the Western Region of British Railways following nationalisation in 1948. On 26 September 1949, it was renamed Acton Main Line. When sectorisation was introduced, the station was served by Network SouthEast until the privatisation of British Rail in 1994.

Together with the underground stations at West Acton and North Acton, Acton Main Line serves the GWR garden estate. This large area of family housing, bordered on three sides by the stations named and on the fourth side by the A40 road, was developed by GWR in the 1920s to accommodate its staff, particularly drivers from the Old Oak Common depot.

By 1947, the station had four platforms; all were partially covered along their length by wooden canopies, as well as a siding next to platform 1. Both platform 1 and its siding were removed in the late 1960s, although remaining platforms 2, 3 and 4 retained their numbering. The Victorian station building was demolished and replaced with a small booking office in 1974, and platform canopies were dismantled. Platform 1's permanent way is still intact, and is used as a fast through line for non-stopping trains; all non-local trains on the Great Western Main Line pass through the station. The frequency of trains was reduced in the 1960s to a peak hour only service.

In the 1990s, the Great Western Main Line was electrified through Acton Main Line as part of the Heathrow Express project. A new station building was completed in early 1996, during extensive renovation of the adjacent bridge on Horn Lane. In 2004, a cut in the number of services to two trains per hour by First Great Western Link was criticised by local residents, who called for the station to be served by Crossrail services. In 2008, Oyster pay as you go became available for passengers at the station.

=== Acton Yard ===
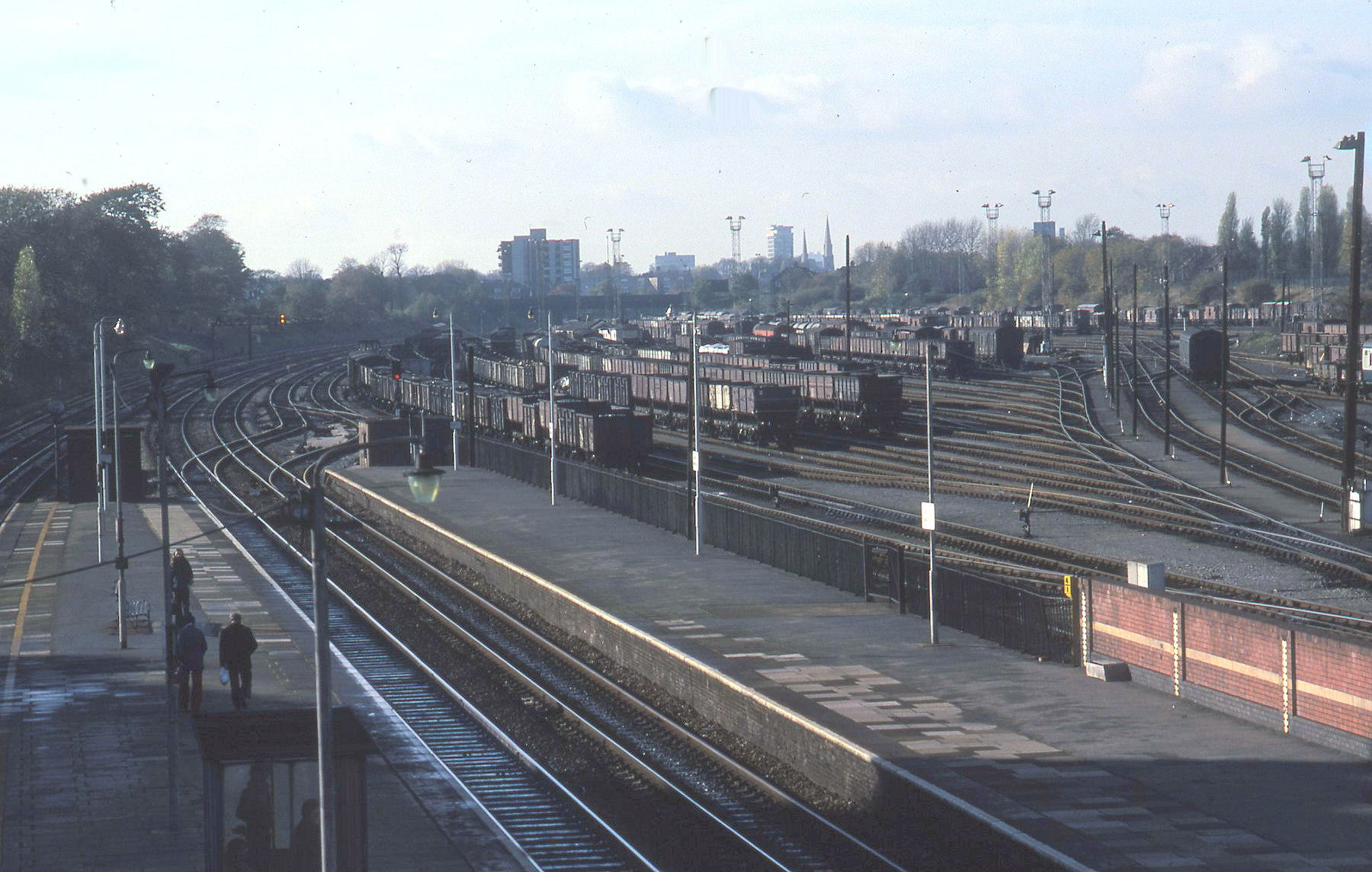
Acton Main Line station with marshalling yard, 1980

The Great Western Railway built a large freight marshalling yard adjacent to the station in the late nineteenth century. It was one of a series of such yards on the perimeter of London used for the transfer of freight between railways. The yard continues in use but on a much reduced scale.

=== Crossrail ===
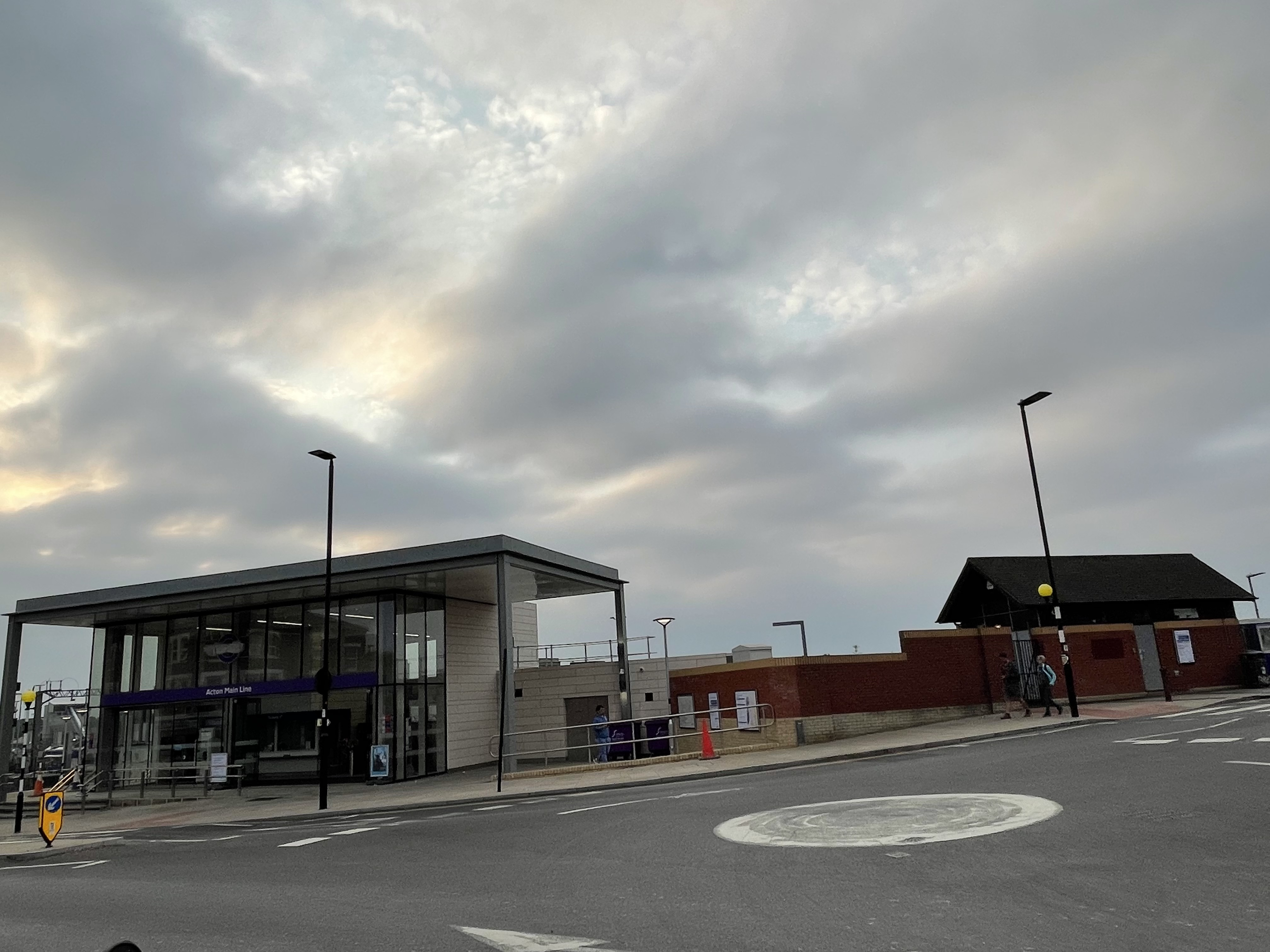
New (2021) and old (1996) station buildings

Acton Main Line was first proposed to be part of the Crossrail project in the 1990s. In 2003, initial public consultation proposed that no Crossrail services would stop at the station. In 2004, it was proposed that services would call at the station seven days a week, but no stations improvements were planned. The number of seats available into central London from the station would double, due to longer and more frequent trains. Following criticism, it was announced in 2005 that a new station building and step free access would be built as part of the project.

In May 2011, Network Rail announced that it would deliver improvements and alterations to prepare the station for Crossrail services. In 2016, the station design was completed, and submitted to Ealing Council for approval. The work would include a new station building designed by Bennetts Associates with level access from Horn Lane, platform extensions, new platform canopies and step-free access to all platforms. Outside the station, improvements funded by Transport for London and Ealing Borough Council would include a new roundabout with zebra crossings, widened pavements, street trees and covered cycle parking.

In mid-2013, a gated barrier was built along the entire length of platforms 2 and 3, protecting passengers from the fast lines. In June 2017, it was announced that completion of the station was delayed until 2019. In December 2017, MTR Crossrail took over management of the station from Great Western Railway, with TfL Rail services running from May 2018 in preparation for the full operation of the Elizabeth line. In 2019, contracts for the new station building were awarded, allowing construction of the new station building to proceed.

Following delays due to the COVID-19 pandemic, the refurbished station opened on 18 March 2021, providing step free access to all platforms.

== Passenger volume ==
Since the new station opened in preparation of the new Elizabeth line in 2019, the usage of this station increased by 536% in six years, leading to overcrowding during peak hours. TfL added extra stops at this station on two peak hour services from Reading as passengers were struggling to board trains towards London.

Passenger Volume at Acton Main Line
	2019-20	2020-21	2021-22	2022-23	2023-24
Entries and exits	350,930	125,954	321,076	1,099,704	2,234,516

== Services ==
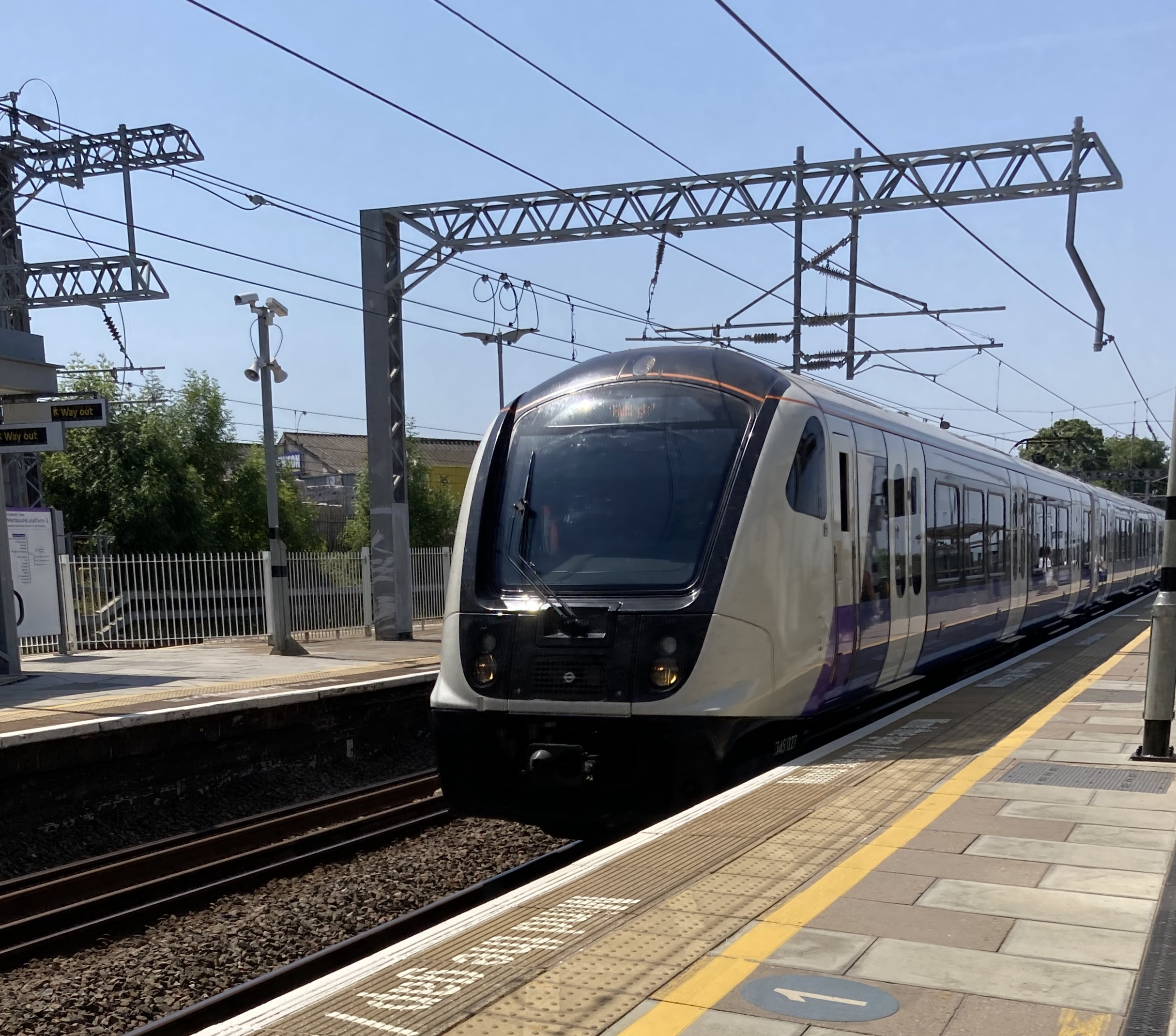
An eastbound Elizabeth line service arriving at Acton Main Line

All services at Acton Main Line are operated by the Elizabeth line using Class 345 electric multiple units.

The typical Monday to Friday off-peak service is:

- 4 tph (trains per hour) westbound to Heathrow Terminal 4
- 4 tph eastbound to Abbey Wood

A Sunday service was introduced at the station in May 2019. Prior to this, the station was closed on Sundays.

In December 2023, two more peak services to Abbey Wood from Reading started stopping at this station.

Preceding station	Elizabeth line	Following station
Ealing Broadway towards Heathrow Terminal 4	Elizabeth line	Paddington towards Abbey Wood
Historical railways
Ealing Broadway Line and station open	Great Western Railway Great Western Main Line	Westbourne Park Line open, mainline station closed

== Connections ==
London Buses routes 260, 266, 440 and night route N266 serve the station.
