= Westbourne Green =

Area of Westbourne, London, England

Coordinates: 51.524178°N 0.201423°W

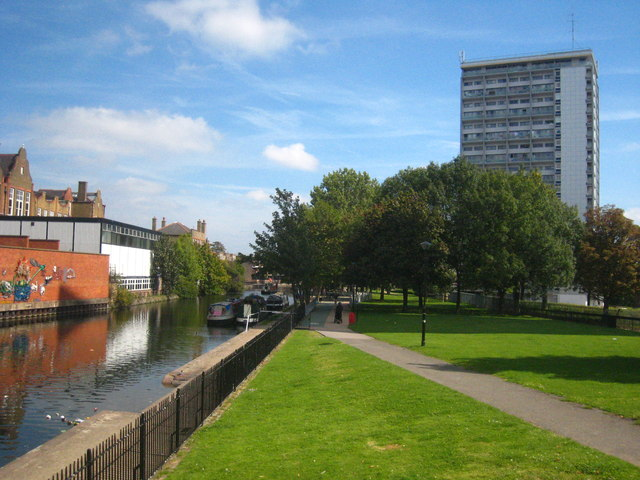
- Westbourne Green and the Grand Union Canal

- Location within Greater London
- London borough: Westminster
- Ceremonial county: Greater London
- Region: London
- Country: England
- Sovereign state: United Kingdom
- Post town: LONDON
- Postcode district: W2/W11
- Dialling code: 020
- Police: Metropolitan
- Fire: London
- Ambulance: London
- UK Parliament: Queen's Park and Maida Vale
- London Assembly: West Central

Westbourne Green is an area of Westbourne, London, the centre of the former hamlet of Westbourne, at the north-western corner of the City of Westminster. It is named for its location west of a bourne (small stream).

Traditionally a rural area, small-scale building had begun by the 17th century. In the early 19th century much more sustained development occurred as a result of the building of the Grand Union Canal and railways through the area.

== Transport and locale ==
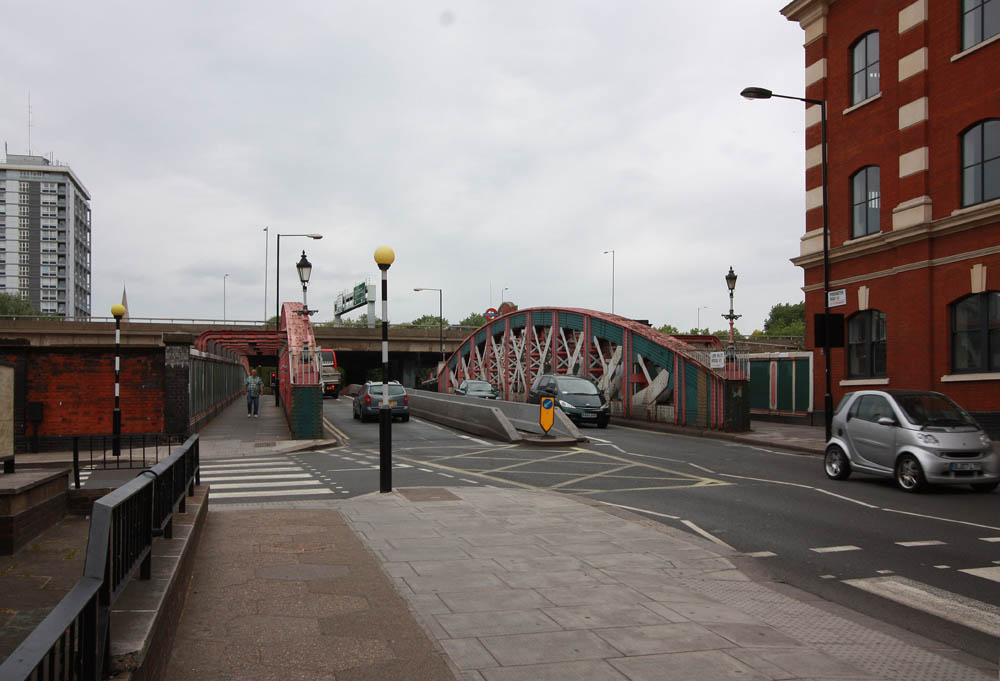
Lord Hills Bridge on Porchester Road, near Royal Oak tube station

Nearby places

- Paddington
- Notting Hill
- Bayswater
- Warwick Avenue

The nearest London Underground stations are Westbourne Park and Royal Oak on the Hammersmith & City line. Warwick Avenue, on the Bakerloo line, is situated a short distance to the northeast.
