= Ladbroke Grove tube station =

London Underground station

Ladbroke Grove
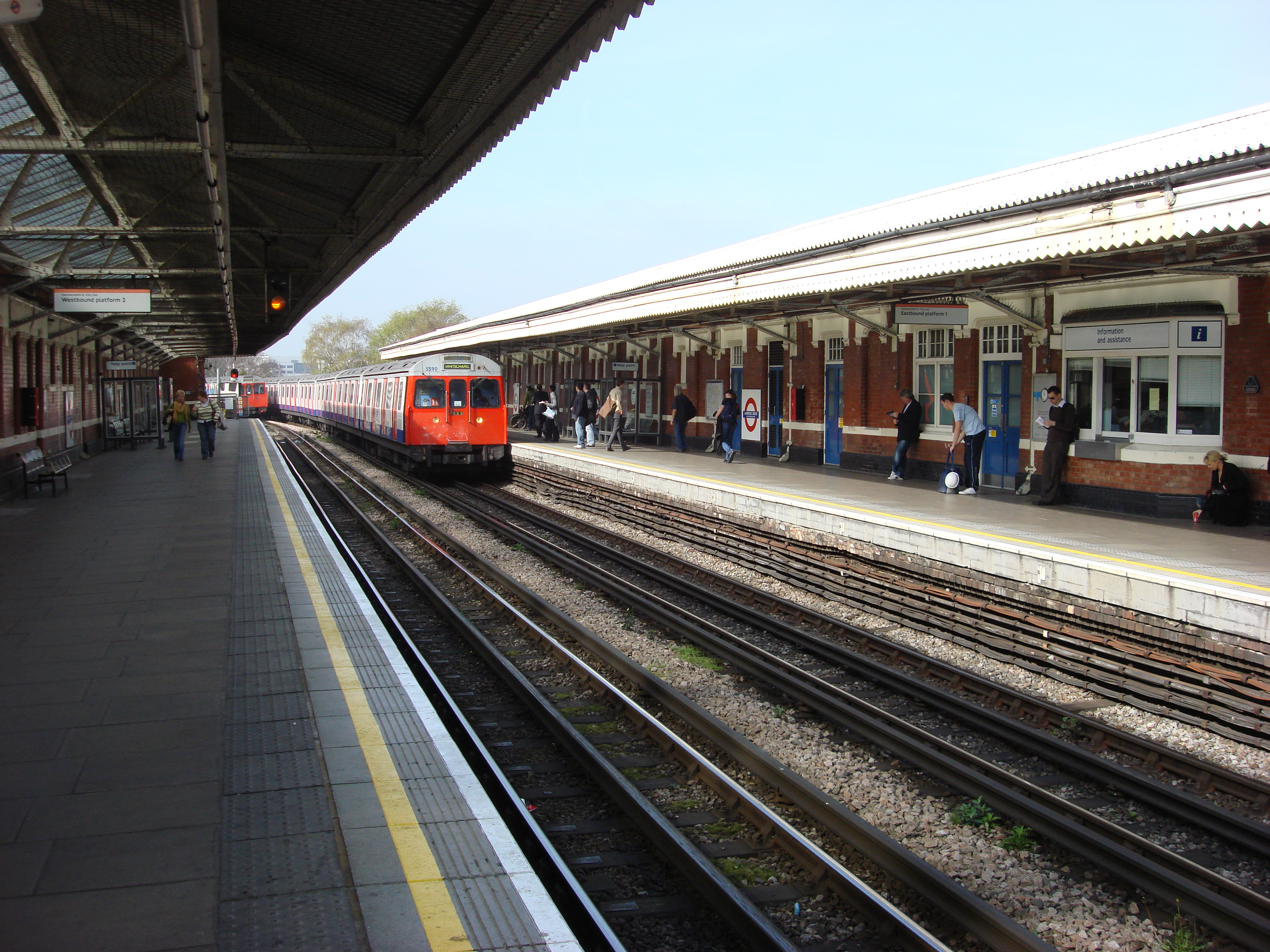
- The westbound platform in 2008, with an approaching eastbound C Stock train
- Interactive map of Ladbroke Grove

General information
- Location: North Kensington
- Local authority: Kensington and Chelsea
- Managed by: London Underground
- Number of platforms: 2
- Fare zone: 2

London Underground annual entry and exit
- 2021: ▼2.65 million
- 2022: ▲5.10 million
- 2023: ▲5.75 million
- 2024: ▲5.87 million
- 2025: ▲6.20 million

Railway companies
- Original company: Hammersmith and City Railway
- Pre-grouping: Hammersmith and City Railway
- Post-grouping: Hammersmith and City Railway

Key dates
- 13 June 1864: Opened as Notting Hill
- 1869: Renamed Notting Hill (Ladbroke Road)
- 1880: Renamed Notting Hill and Ladbroke Grove
- 1 June 1919: Renamed Ladbroke Grove (North Kensington)
- 1938: Renamed Ladbroke Grove
- 13 December 2009: Circle line service introduced

Other information
- External links: TfL station info page
- Coordinates: 51.5172°N 0.2106°W

Ladbroke Grove (/ˈlædbrʊk ˈɡroʊv/) is a London Underground station situated in North Kensington, between Latimer Road and Westbourne Park stations. It is served by the Circle and Hammersmith & City lines, and is within London fare zone 2.

== History ==
Opened by the Metropolitan Railway on 13 June 1864, the station was originally named Notting Hill. With the extension of the line from Paddington to Hammersmith, it was renamed Notting Hill and Ladbroke Grove in 1880, followed by Ladbroke Grove (North Kensington) on 1 June 1919, before acquiring its present name in 1938. The name changes were made in an effort to avoid confusion with the opening of Notting Hill Gate tube station in 1868. The station is named after the street of the same name on which its entrance is located.

Following the amalgamation on 1 July 1933 of London's tram, bus, and underground railway companies, Ladbroke Grove station became part of the Metropolitan line, and remained so for the next 55 years, before the section of the line between Hammersmith and Edgware Road was rebranded as the Hammersmith & City line. Circle line trains began calling at Ladbroke Grove in December 2009, following the line's extension from Edgware Road to Hammersmith.

Since Ladbroke Grove is the nearest station to Portobello Road Market, stallholders and shopkeepers launched a campaign in 2006 to rename the station to Portobello Road in an effort to emphasise its proximity to the market. Although the campaign was ultimately unsuccessful, TfL did partially appease the traders by altering the roundels at platform level to contain the inscription "For Portobello Road" underneath the station name in smaller text.

As a result of financial constraints in 2009, TfL decided to stop work on a project to provide step-free access at Ladbroke Grove and five other stations, on the grounds that they were relatively quiet stations which were just one or two stops away from an existing step-free station. Ladbroke Grove is two stops away from Wood Lane, which has step-free access. The project at Ladbroke Grove would have provided two new lifts to platform level, and a new step-free entrance. £3.06 million was spent on the station before the project was halted.

== See also ==
- Planned Crossrail station

Preceding station	London Underground	Following station
Latimer Road towards Hammersmith	Circle line	Westbourne Park towards Edgware Road via Aldgate
Latimer Road towards Hammersmith	Hammersmith & City line	Westbourne Park towards Barking
Former services
Latimer Road towards Hammersmith	Metropolitan line Hammersmith branch (1864-1990)	Westbourne Park towards Paddington
