= Westbourne Park tube station =

London Underground station

Westbourne Park
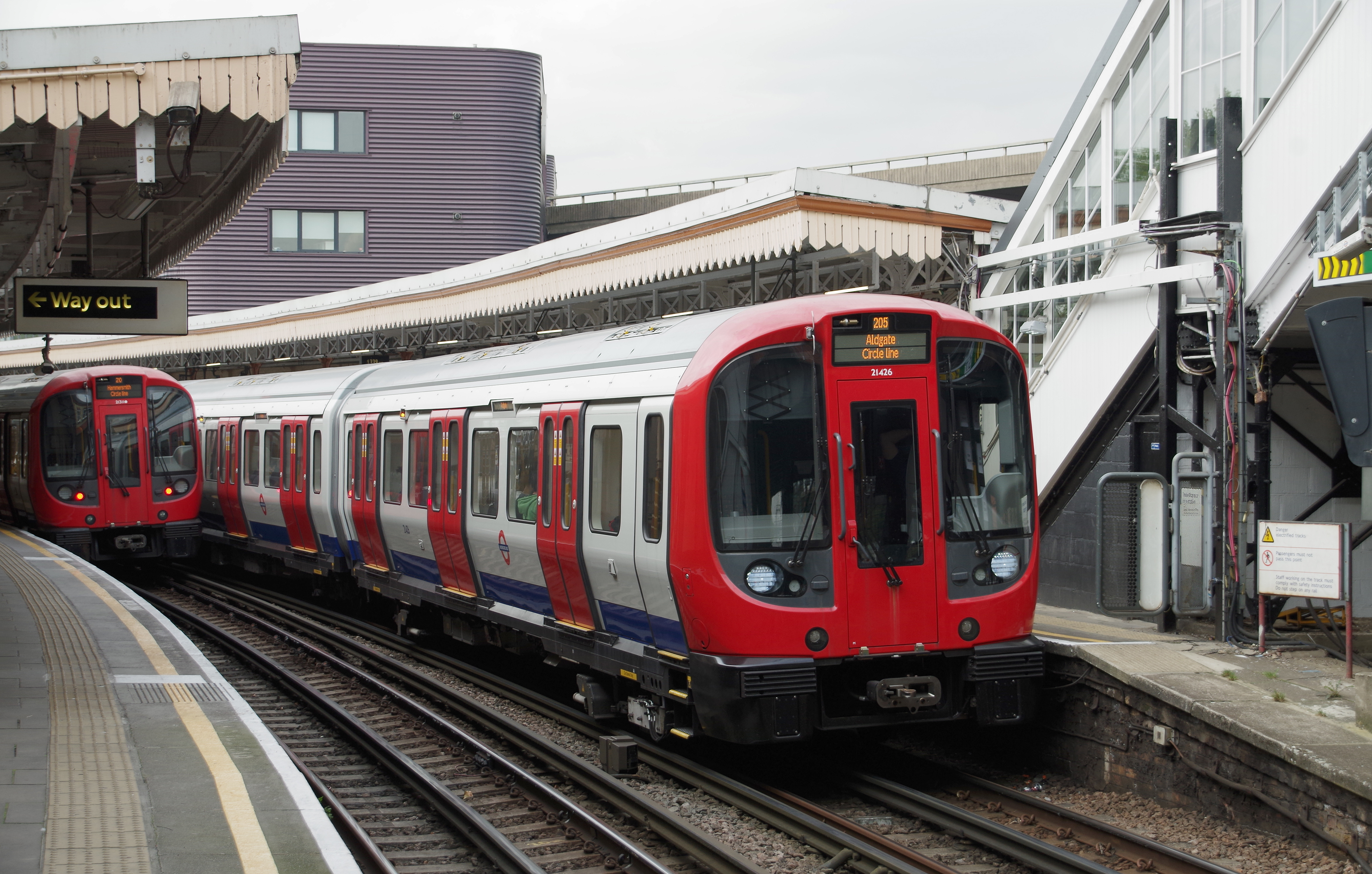
- Two Circle line trains passing each other at the station
- Interactive map of Westbourne Park

General information
- Location: Notting Hill
- Local authority: Royal Borough of Kensington and Chelsea
- Managed by: London Underground
- Owner: London Underground
- Number of platforms: 2
- Fare zone: 2

London Underground annual entry and exit
- 2020: ▼2.25 million
- 2021: ▼1.82 million
- 2022: ▲3.21 million
- 2023: ▲3.53 million
- 2024: ▲3.92 million

Railway companies
- Original company: Hammersmith and City Railway

Key dates
- 1 February 1866: H&C station opened
- 30 October 1871: GW main line station opened
- 1 November 1871: H&C station resited
- 13 March 1992: GW main line station closed

Other information
- External links: TfL station info page
- Coordinates: 51.52111°N 0.20111°W

Westbourne Park is a London Underground station. It is located in the Notting Hill area of the Royal Borough of Kensington and Chelsea. The station is on the Circle and Hammersmith & City lines, between Ladbroke Grove and Royal Oak stations. It is in London fare zone 2.

== History ==
Although the Metropolitan Railway (MR) had been extended to Notting Hill and Hammersmith on 1 June 1864, the first station by this name did not open until 1 February 1866. In 1867, with the companies on better terms, the MR bought a share of the Hammersmith & City Railway (H&CR) from the Great Western Railway (GWR), after which it eliminated the broad gauge track and operated almost all the trains (the H&CR's identity being effectively lost).

The original station closed on 31 October 1871, and was replaced the following day by a new station, constructed to the west of the original. To remove this traffic from its own busy main line, the GWR built a new pair of tracks from Paddington to Westbourne Park, and on 12 May 1878 it opened a dive-under to remove conflicts where the service crossed the main line. (Note: These tracks were dedicated to Underground use, but they only came into LU control on 1 January 1948 and ownership on 1 January 1950.) A bomb planted by the Suffragettes was discovered at the station on 16 May 1913.

The Circle line was extended to Hammersmith in 2009. The line now operates between Hammersmith and Edgware Road via a single complete circuit of the previous route. (Note: Hammersmith, Edgware Road, Liverpool Street, Tower Hill, South Kensington, High Street Kensington, Paddington, and Edgware Road (and vice versa).) This was done with the aim of improving reliability by providing a place for trains to terminate after each trip rather than letting delays accumulate. However, it means that no trains through Notting Hill Gate go east of Edgware Road.

== National Rail platforms ==
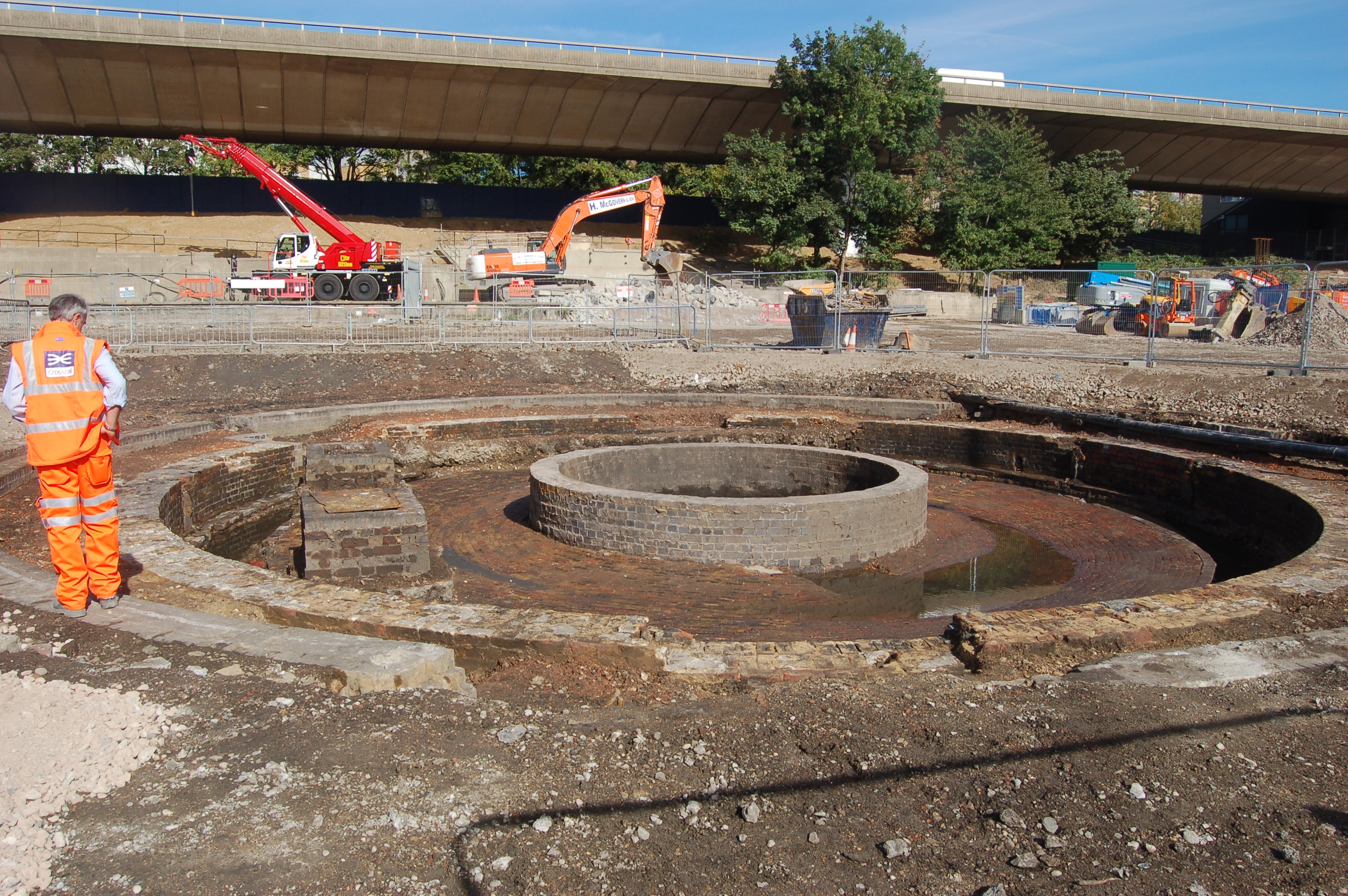
Victorian turntable excavated near the station

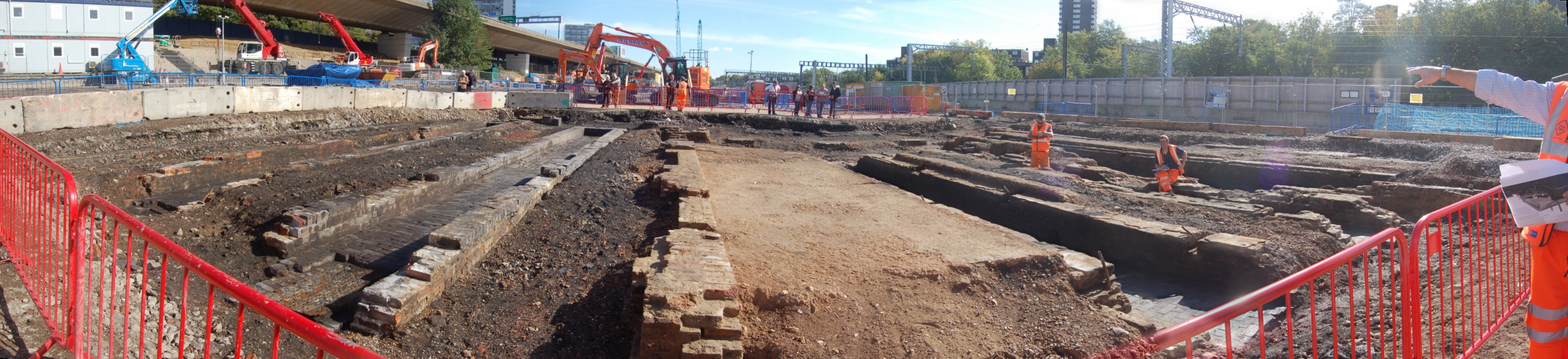
Victorian engine shed excavated near the station

The GWR opened platforms on the Great Western Main Line on 30 October 1871, but these closed in March 1992. The Up line through the station had a 30 mph (48 km/h) speed limit, which was deemed unacceptable for the planned Heathrow Express services; instead of modifying the station's platforms; British Rail decided that it would be more cost-effective to permanently close and remove them, and closure notices were published on 13 December 1990.

Royal Oak, another station on the Circle and Hammersmith & City lines, was also once served by the GWR, but its services were withdrawn in 1934. Today, the first stop away from Paddington is at Acton Main Line. Industrial archaeologists have found the remains of buildings including a broad gauge train shed for Brunel's original lines, a turntable, and engine sheds in excavations east of the station as part of the land clearance work for the Crossrail project.

== Connections ==
London Bus day and night routes serve the station.

== In popular culture ==
Early railway buff Fanny Johnson, fourteen years old, recorded passing engines in her notebook ‘Names of Engines on the Great Western that I have Seen’ in 1861.

The station was featured in the video of the Boris Gardiner song "I Want to Wake Up with You".

== Notes and references ==
=== Bibliography ===
- Butt, R.V.J. (1995). The Directory of Railway Stations. Yeovil: Patrick Stephens Ltd. ISBN 1-85260-508-1. R508.
- Rose, Douglas (December 2007) [1980]. The London Underground: A Diagrammatic History (8th ed.). Harrow Weald: Capital Transport. ISBN 978-1-85414-315-0.

Preceding station	London Underground	Following station
Ladbroke Grove towards Hammersmith	Circle line	Royal Oak towards Edgware Road via Aldgate
Ladbroke Grove towards Hammersmith	Hammersmith & City line	Royal Oak towards Barking
Former services
Ladbroke Grove towards Hammersmith	Metropolitan line Hammersmith branch (1864–1990)	Royal Oak towards Paddington
Acton; Line and station open	Great Western Railway; Great Western Main Line	Royal Oak; Line and station open
Old Oak Lane Halt; Line open, station closed	Great Western Railway; New North Main Line	Royal Oak; Line and station open
Acton Main Line; Line and station open	Network SouthEast; Great Western Main Line	London Paddington; Line and station open
