= Bayswater Road =

Road in London

Coordinates: 51°30′37.5″N 0°11′6.5″W

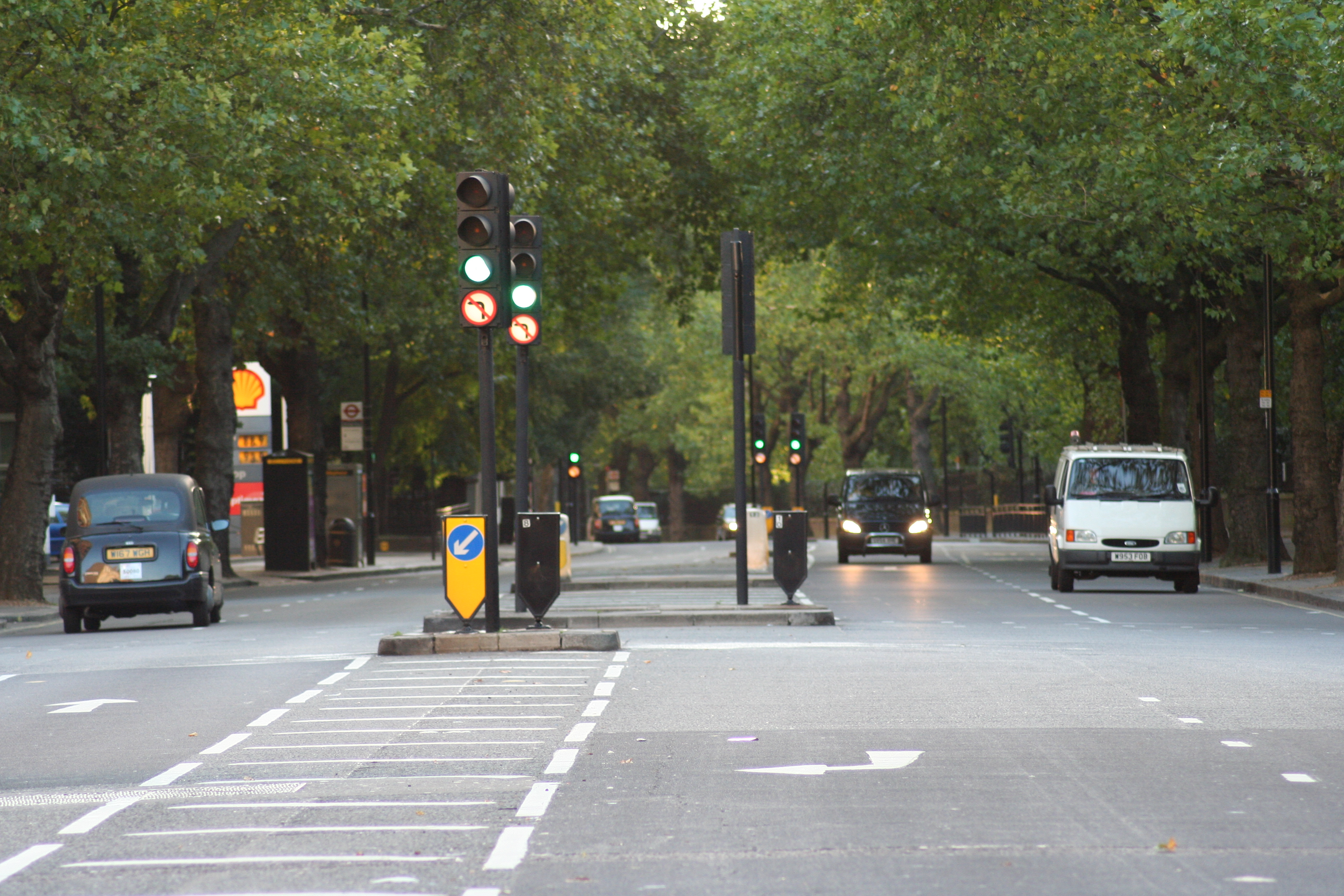
Bayswater Road

Bayswater Road is the main road running along the northern edge of Hyde Park in London. Originally part of the A40 road, it is now designated part of the A402 road.

== Route ==
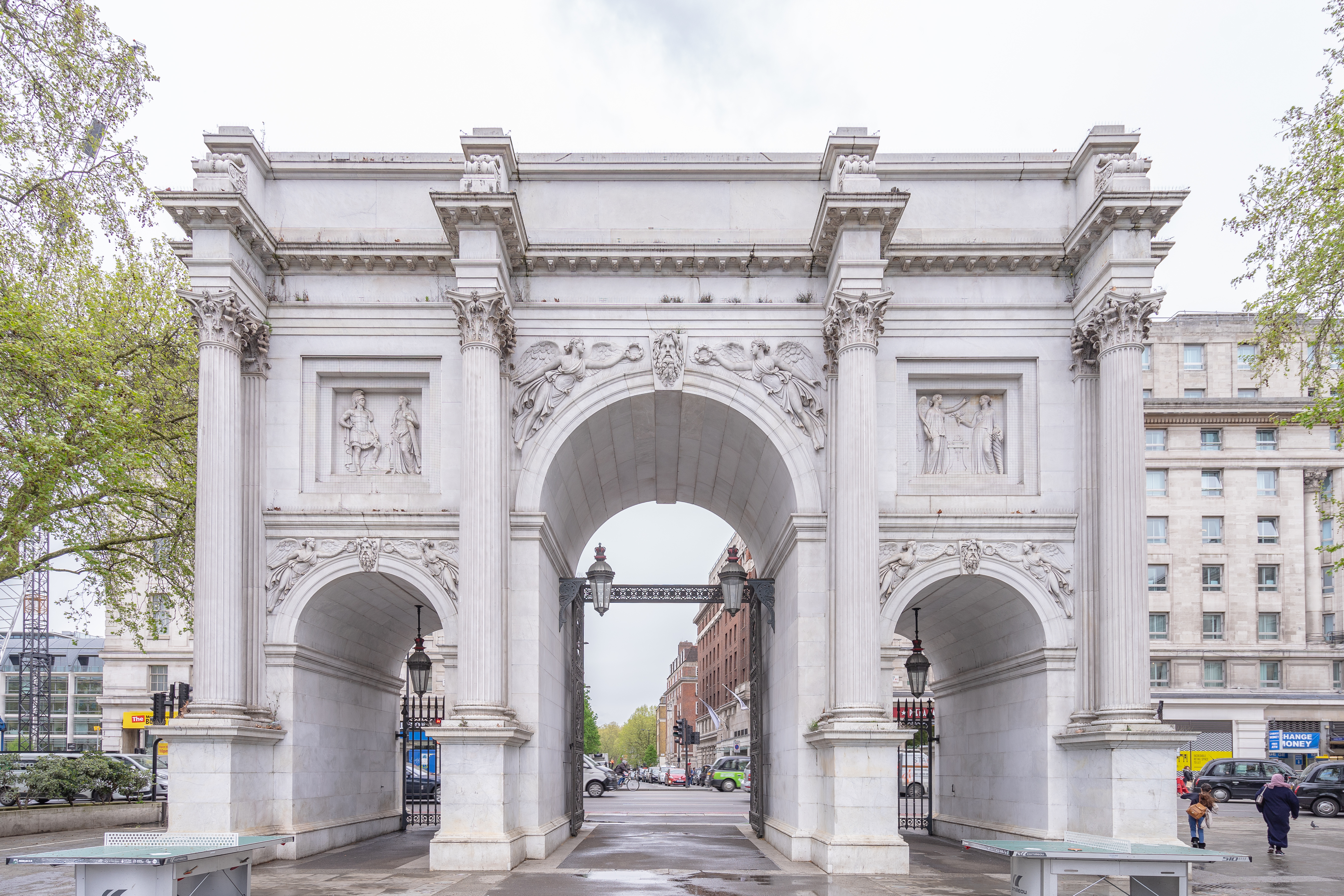
Marble Arch at the Eastern end of the road

In the east, Bayswater Road originates at Marble Arch roadway at the Marble Arch junction, and at its western end it continues into Notting Hill Gate. It is mostly within the City of Westminster but a small portion of the road's western end lies in Kensington and Chelsea.

== History ==
The road is part of the Via Trinobantia, an old Roman Road, later becoming a turnpike road. Trinobantia in latin translates to Trinity. Leading from Tyburn to Bayswater, the road had become known as Bayswater Road by the 1860s. The Swan Inn and the Black Lion on Bayswater Road were both established in the 18th century. In 1861, George Francis Train experimented with a horse tramway system on Bayswater Road. The Royal Lancaster Hotel was built in 1967, initially intended as an office block.

Since February 2023, the western end of Bayswater Road has had the joint official name of Kyiv Road, a change enacted by Westminster Council as a consequence of the Russian invasion of Ukraine the previous year, as this section of the road runs close to the Russian Embassy. However, the renaming does not apply to addresses on the road, as they have historically been addressed as part of the adjacent street.

== Cultural references ==
J. M. Barrie lived at No. 100 Bayswater Road from 1902 to 1909, where he wrote Peter Pan. The street is where the fictional upper-middle class Forsyte family live in John Galsworthy's The Forsyte Saga.

The Bayswater Road Art Show takes place every Sunday. It is the largest regular open-air art exhibition in the world.

== Notable sites ==
- Tyburn Convent
  - Building № 10, London's "smallest house" which is sandwiched between buildings №9 and №11. Buildings №9 and №10 are both owned by the Tyburn Convent.
- St George's Fields
- Royal Lancaster Hotel
- Bayswater Road Sunday Art Exhibition, at which over 250 artists exhibit original art on the Royal Park Railings between Lancaster Gate and Queensway tube stations every Sunday.
- The Embassy of the Czech Republic is located at the junction with Kensington Palace Gardens
- The High Commission of Guyana located opposite the Embassy of Russia
- Park Modern

== Transport ==
Lancaster Gate and Queensway stations (both on the London Underground's Central line) are located on Bayswater Road. Bayswater tube station is located near Queensway station and is on the Circle and District Lines.

London bus routes 94 and 148 run along the whole length of Bayswater Road. Bus route 274 starts at Lancaster Gate station in the road and serves the eastern part, while bus route 70 serves the western end.

During the Covid-19 pandemic, the road was reduced from 4 lanes of motor traffic to 2 lanes, to enable the creation of cycle routes as part of 11km of additional cycle lanes across the City of Westminster. The change – which was initially temporary – has now been made permanent.
