= Royal Lancaster Hotel =

Hotel in London, England

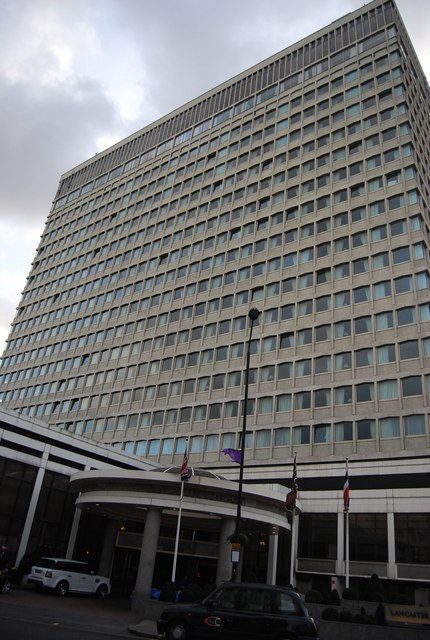
- Interactive map of the Royal Lancaster Hotel area

General information
- Location: Bayswater Road, Lancaster Gate, Bayswater, London, United Kingdom
- Coordinates: 51°30′43.3″N 0°10′31″W
- Opened: 1 August 1967
- Management: Preferred Hotels & Resorts

Technical details
- Floor count: 18

Other information
- Number of rooms: 411

Website
- www.royallancaster.com

The Royal Lancaster Hotel is a hotel on Bayswater Road in Lancaster Gate, Bayswater, west London, on the northeastern side of Kensington Gardens, adjacent to the Italian Gardens and Lancaster Gate tube station. The hotel was opened in 1967 and is now operated by Preferred Hotels & Resorts. It has 411 rooms spanning 18 floors and 9 conference rooms. It underwent an £80 million renovation in 2017.

== History ==
The Royal Lancaster Hotel was opened 1 August 1967 as The Rank Organisation's first hotel in London and their largest.

In July 1968, The Beatles held their release party for the film Yellow Submarine at the new hotel, which hosted a submarine-themed disco with guests all wearing yellow. In 1968, footage was shot at the hotel for The Italian Job (1969), where the character of Croker meets girls for an orgy at a room in the hotel in celebration of being released from prison. The room became a favourite haunt of rockstars after the release of the film, and the hotel still retains its "swinging 60s" image.

The actor Cary Grant met his last wife Barbara Harris at the hotel in 1976 while attending a Fabergé conference, where she was employed.

In 2017 the hotel underwent an £80 million restoration. It is operated by Preferred Hotel & Resorts. In commemoration of the 50th anniversary of The Italian Job in June 2019, the hotel in conjunction with the Italian Job Charity Rally and MINI Park Lane raised money for a grant to give children's charity Buttle UK.

== Architecture and facilities ==
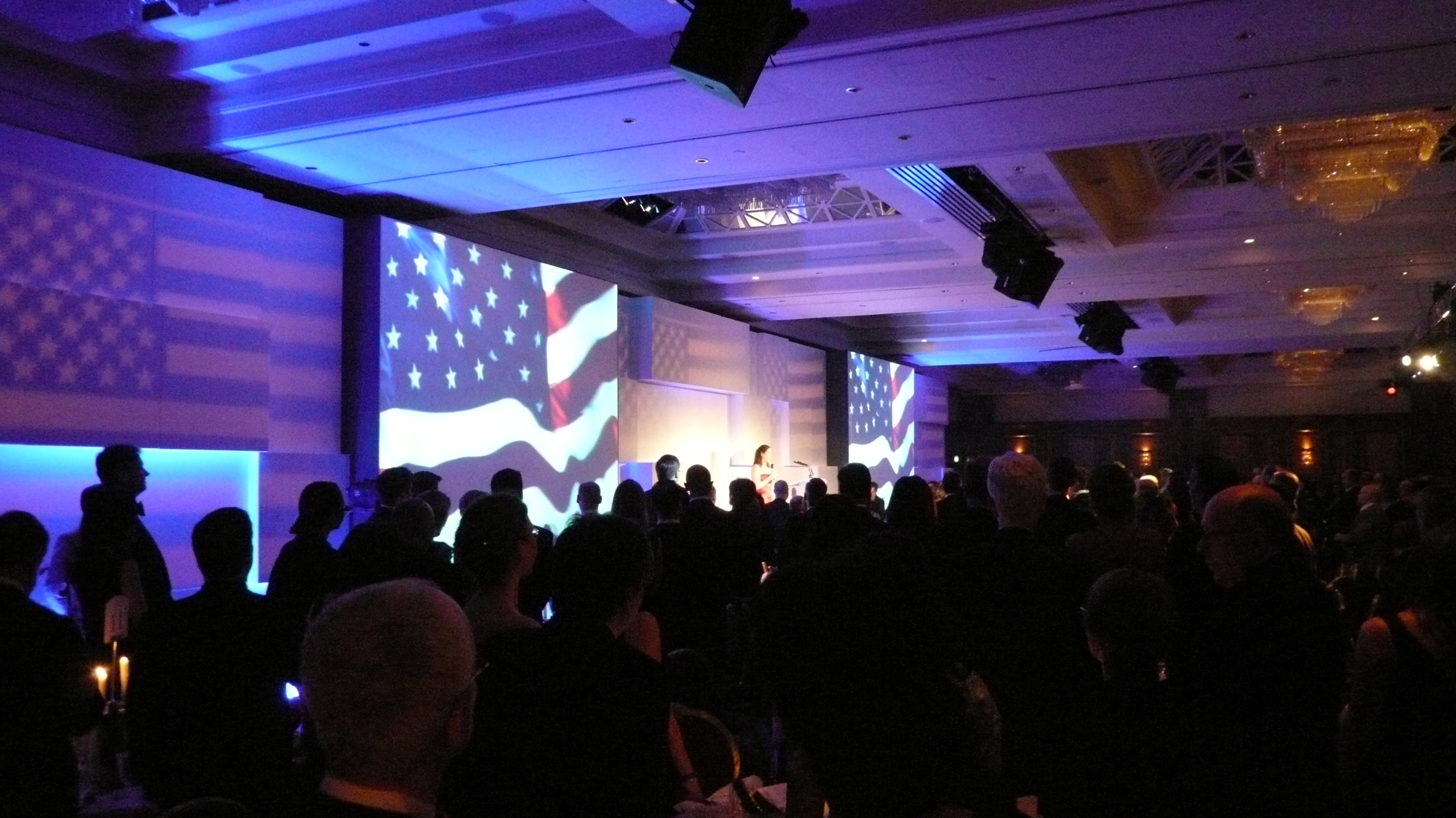
The Democrats Abroad Inaugural Ball at the Royal Lancaster Hotel in 2009

The hotel was designed by Richard Seifert, with the intention to build an office block for The Rank Organization. The hotel has 411 rooms on 18 floors. On the 18th floor is the Royal Suite, overlooking Hyde Park, with dark wood furnishings, velvet and a Carrara marble bathroom.

There are 9 meeting rooms, covering a space of 30,267 sq ft. The largest room has a capacity of 1700 people. Several of the hotel rooms feature toy Mini cars, paying homage to the Italian Job film.

The restaurant Nipa Thai specializes in Thai cuisine and features an all-female team. Thai, Japanese, and Arabic dishes and traditional English afternoon tea and cakes are served in the breakfast room. On the lower roof is a beehive facility.
