= London Buses route 94 =

London bus route

94
- London United BYD Alexander Dennis Enviro400EV on John Prince's Street in October 2026

Overview
- Operator: London United (First Bus London)
- Garage: Shepherd's Bush
- Vehicle: BYD Alexander Dennis Enviro400EV
- Night-time: 24-hour service

Route
- Start: Acton Green
- Via: Turnham Green; Shepherd's Bush; Queensway
- End: Marble Arch station

London Buses route 94 is a Transport for London contracted bus route in London, England. Running between Acton Green and Marble Arch station, it is operated by First Bus London subsidiary London United.

== History ==
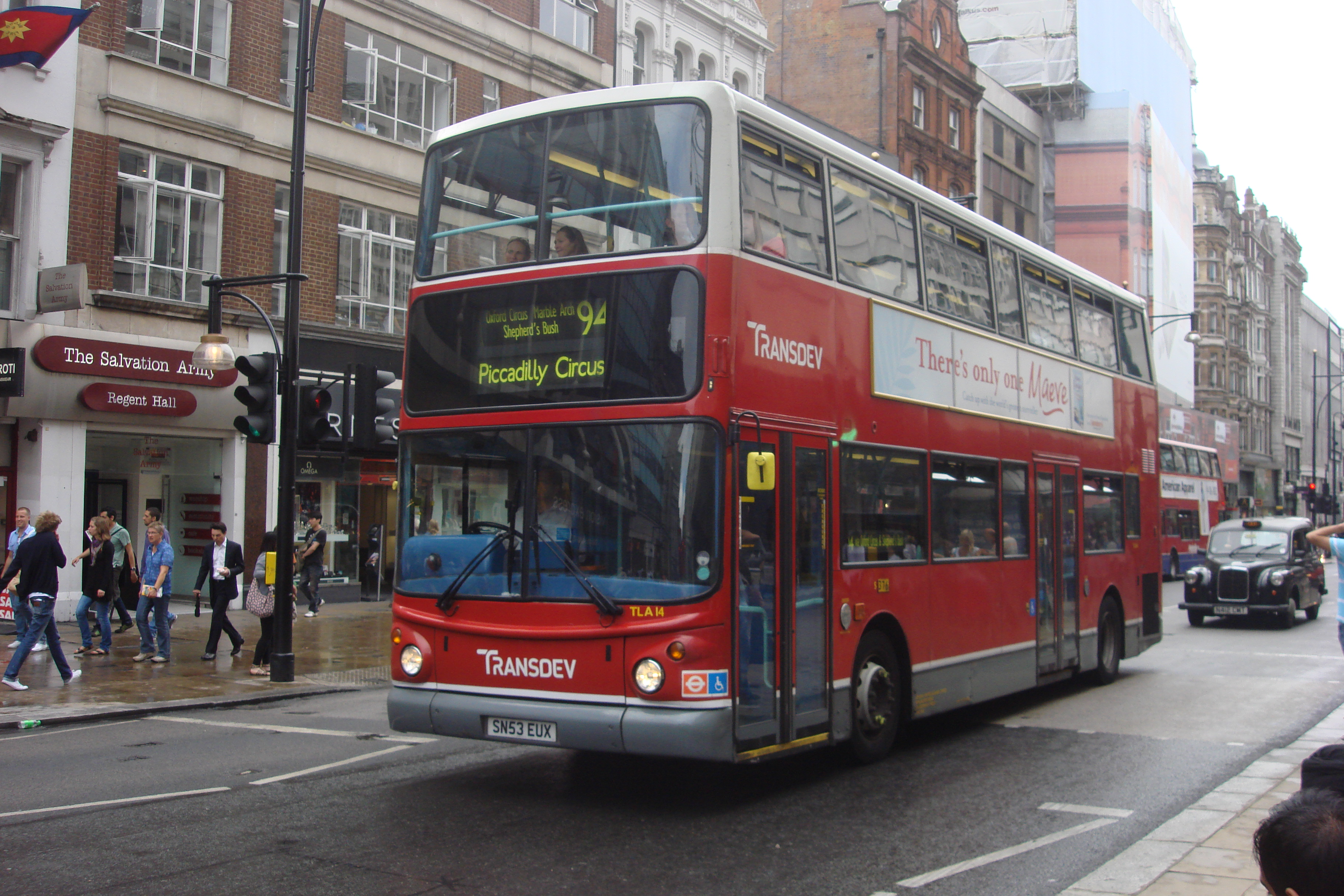
London United Alexander ALX400 bodied Dennis Trident 2 on Oxford Street in July 2010

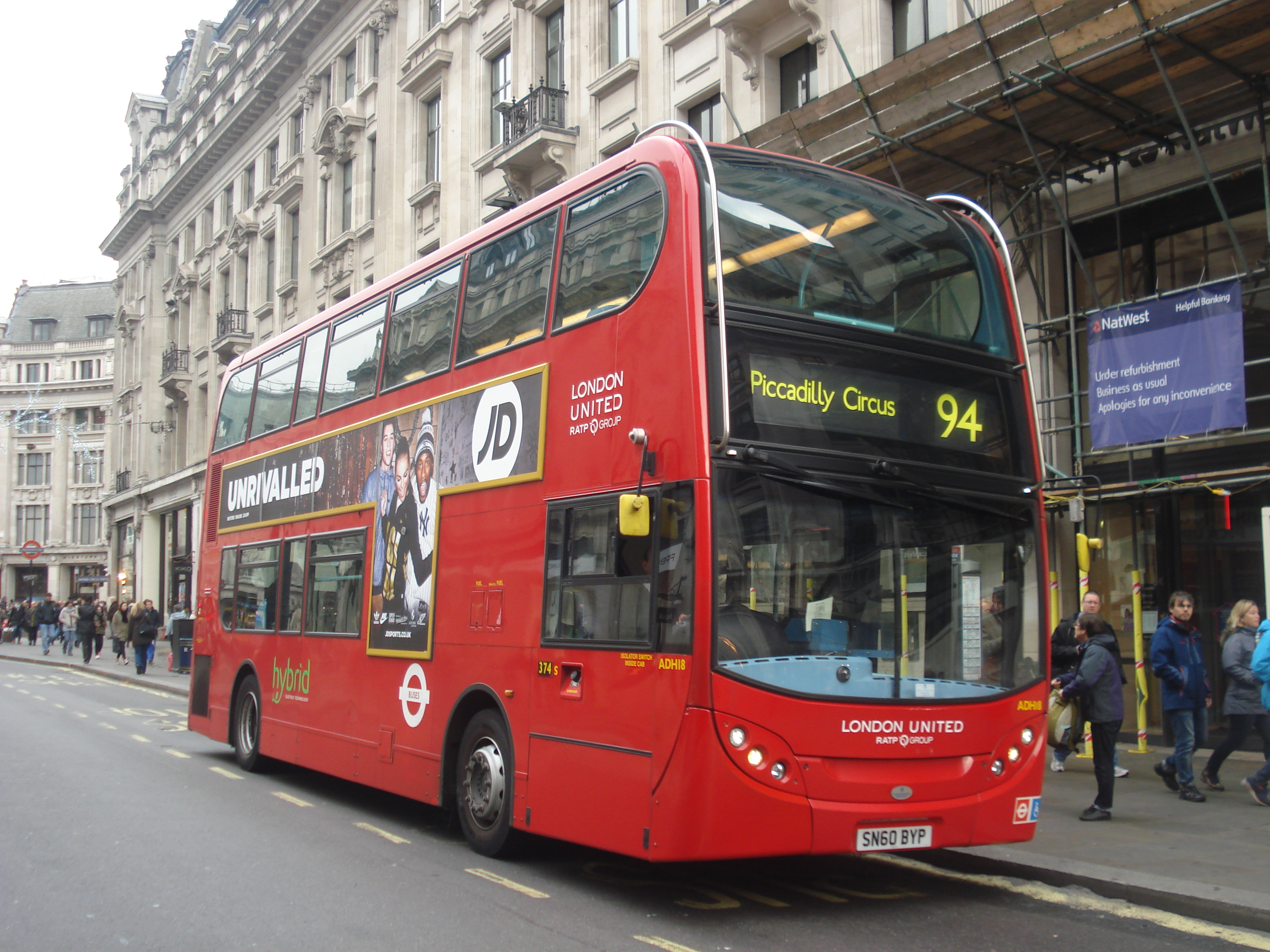
London United Alexander Dennis Enviro400H on Oxford Street in December 2013

Route 94 commenced operating on 22 September 1990 to replace the withdrawn section of route 88 between Acton Green and Oxford Circus, it then ran parallel to route 88 to Trafalgar Square (Sundays only). On 13 July 1991 it was diverted to East Acton DuCane Road and the service level increased following the truncation of route 12 west of Shepherd's Bush. At the same time it was extended at all times to Trafalgar Square.

Route 94 gained a night service in the form of N94 in July 1999. It was the first night bus and was introduced by the General.

On 24 January 2004, route 94 was converted to one man operation with the AEC Routemasters replaced by Alexander ALX400 bodied Dennis Trident 2s. Twenty Alexander Dennis Enviro400Hs entered service on the route in late 2010.

In February 2020, 29 BYD Alexander Dennis Enviro400EVs entered service on route 94.

On 28 February 2025, the route passed from London United to First Bus London following the acquisition of RATP Dev Transit London by FirstGroup.

On 21 November 2025, Transport for London launched a consultation proposing to withdraw the route between Marble Arch station and Charles II Street as part of plans to pedestrianise Oxford Street. In March 2026, it was confirmed that the changes would proceed and they were implemented on 24 October 2026.

== Cultural significance ==
Route 94 was featured on the BBC Radio 4 program Today in December 2003 as part of a story by guest editor Gillian Reynolds on the withdrawal of the Routemaster. It also appeared on the front of the annual Britain's Buses calendar for the same year.

== Current route ==
Route 94 operates via these primary locations:

- Acton Green
- Turnham Green station
- Goldhawk Road station
- Shepherd's Bush stations
- Holland Park station
- Notting Hill Gate station
- Queensway station
- Lancaster Gate station
- Marble Arch station
