= Hotel loyalty program =

Marketing strategy used by hotels to attract business at their properties

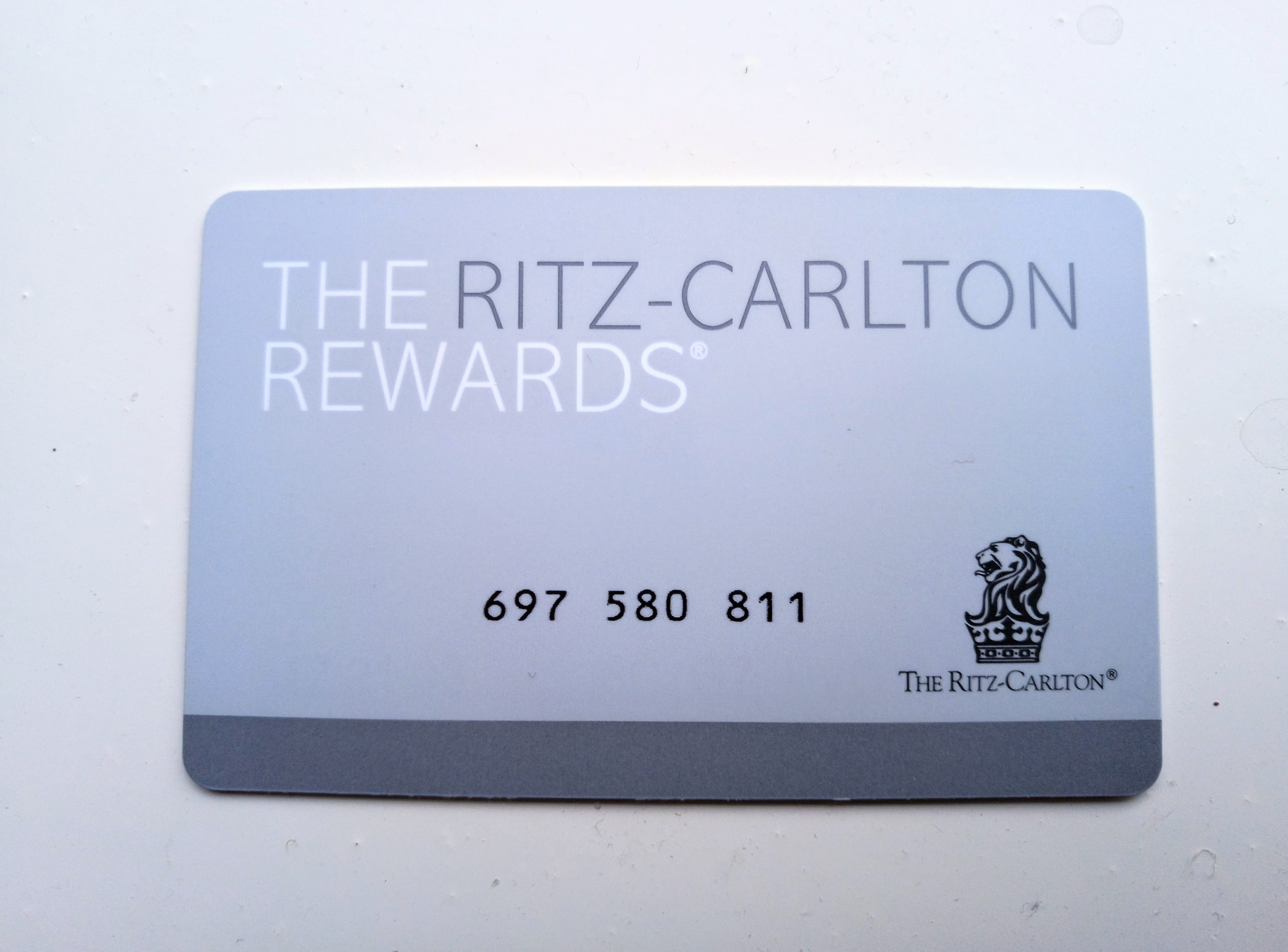
Ritz-Carlton Rewards membership card

A hotel loyalty program or hotel reward program is a loyalty program typically run by a hotel chain. It is a marketing strategy used by hotel chains to attract and retain business at their properties. The program works to entice customers, especially business or other frequent hotel guests, to favour that particular brand or group of hotels over others when selecting a hotel by offering discounts or privileges, such as upgrades.

A hotel loyalty program will generally be free to enter and may have multiple levels. Newly joined members may be offered some privileges, such as free Internet, to encourage them to join the scheme. This ensures that the guest has an incentive to sign up for the scheme, even if they do not anticipate reaching the next rewards level. In addition, joining the scheme and staying nights in a hotel will typically accrue points which can be redeemed for free nights in hotels (the number of points required to stay a night may vary based on the normal cost of the hotel and on the day of the week or season) and other benefits, such as a welcome gift, free parking, discount pricing, greater points earning and buying power, and/or no blackout dates. Hotel loyalty programs also serve as social platforms for members, helping them to build a collective identity and collective self-esteem. Hotel brand managers may effectively develop a loyalty program that cultivates long-term customer-brand ties by understanding a fundamental psychological process.

Higher levels in the scheme will typically offer a combination of benefits including free room upgrades, bonus points, rolling 24-hour check-in, and free access to more of the hotel's facilities, such as buffet breakfasts, executive lounges, spas, and other features. Mid-tiers and higher levels are typically reached by staying a certain number of nights during the membership year, or by obtaining a credit card or charge card associated with that hotel chain or one of its partners.

The largest hotel chains operate reward programs, including Hilton Worldwide, Hyatt, Marriott International, and Wyndham Hotels & Resorts. However, some luxury brands, such as Four Seasons Hotels and Resorts, have eschewed the concept, saying they prefer building loyalty through personalised service.

== Links to other loyalty programs ==
=== Credit cards ===
Most major hotel loyalty programs are associated with one or more branded credit cards. By spending on the hotel-affiliated credit card, the customer earns loyalty points and other benefits in the hotel program. These points are used for free hotel nights. Some credit cards also offer an automatic upgrade to a higher level of the hotel reward scheme.

=== Travel partners ===
==== Airlines ====
Hotel reward schemes may be linked to frequent flyer schemes which permit points to be exchanged for frequent flyer points (subject to a partnership between the respective brands) and vice versa. When joining a hotel loyalty program, it is often possible to elect to earn frequent flyer points with an airline, rather than hotel reward points.

==== Many hotels and resorts have partnerships with casinos ====
Some of the hotel-casino partnerships include:

- Hyatt Hotels and its World of Hyatt loyalty program has reciprocal points and status earning arrangements with MGM Resorts International's hotels and casinos and their Mlife Rewards program, as well as with Ocean Resort and Casino Atlantic City.
- Wyndham and its Wyndham Rewards loyalty program have reciprocal points and status earning arrangements with Caesars Entertainment's Total Rewards loyalty program.

== Mattress run ==
A 'mattress run' is a stay in a hotel with the purpose of achieving hotel loyalty program status. This is a similar concept to a mileage run for an airline loyalty scheme, however while a mileage run requires the traveller to actually fly to their destination, a mattress run only requires the guest to check-in physically, after which the guest might sleep at home, or in a different hotel. A guest performing a mattress run would book stays in cheaper hotels and at cheaper times of week or year.

A mattress run will only make sense when a traveller is otherwise staying at the loyalty program's properties, but has not stayed enough nights to reach their desired status level. Mattress running in an area with low hotel costs, such as Arizona, could earn benefits when staying in more expensive cities, such as New York, including breakfasts that might cost $30 or more, and free suite upgrades retailing at hundreds of dollars.

== Independent loyalty schemes ==
Some independent hotel associations, such as Preferred Hotels & Resorts, Leading Hotels of the World, operate loyalty schemes, which function as a single scheme despite the hotels being independently owned.

The hotel booking website Hotels.com operates a simple reward scheme, whereby booking hotels through the site earns credit towards free hotel nights.
