= Black Lion, Bayswater =

Former public house in London

Coordinates: 51.510479°N 0.186620°W

The Black Lion in 2011

The Black Lion was a public house on Bayswater Road overlooking Kensington Gardens in London. It dated from the early 18th century when Bayswater Road was a turnpike road, but was demolished to make way for a luxury flat development in 2019.

== History and description ==
An inn on the site, then known as the Oxford Arms, was standing by 1729. By 1751 it was known as the Black Lion and gave its name to Black Lion Lane to its west, now known as the Queensway for Queen Victoria.

The pub was rebuilt in the mid 19th century, the building lasting until its closure in January 2015 and subsequent demolition in 2019. It was sold £27 million in 2014, with its land used for the Park Modern residential development. The sale price made it the second highest of any pub in London at the time, after City Pride in Canary Wharf which had been sold for £32 million in 2008, and eventually replaced with the Landmark Pinnacle.
