= The Mitre, Bayswater =

Pub in Bayswater, London

The Mitre
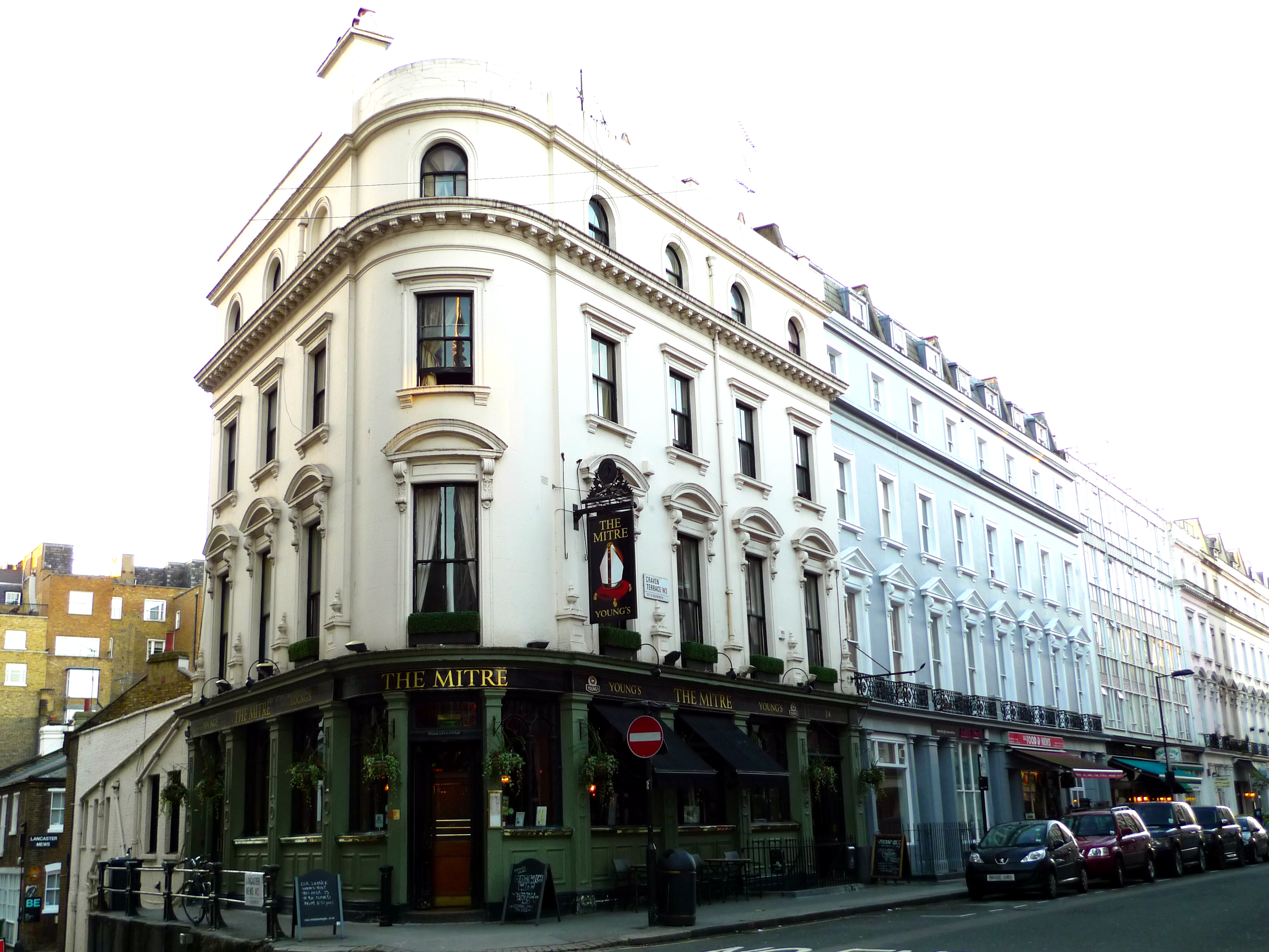
- The Mitre
- Type: Public house
- Location: 24 Craven Terrace, Lancaster Gate, Bayswater, City of Westminster
- Coordinates: 51°30′44″N 0°10′42″W

Listed Building – Grade II
- Official name: MITRE PUBLIC HOUSE
- Designated: 10-Apr-1975
- Reference no.: 1220953

The Mitre is a Grade II listed public house at 24 Craven Terrace, Lancaster Gate, Bayswater, City of Westminster.

It was built in the mid-19th century. It has traditional wooden bar furniture with original etched glass and mosaic floors. An upstairs dining and function room has been added as well as a downstairs speakeasy-style bar.

It is part of the Young's Brewery estate.
