= Swan Inn, Westminster =

Swan Inn
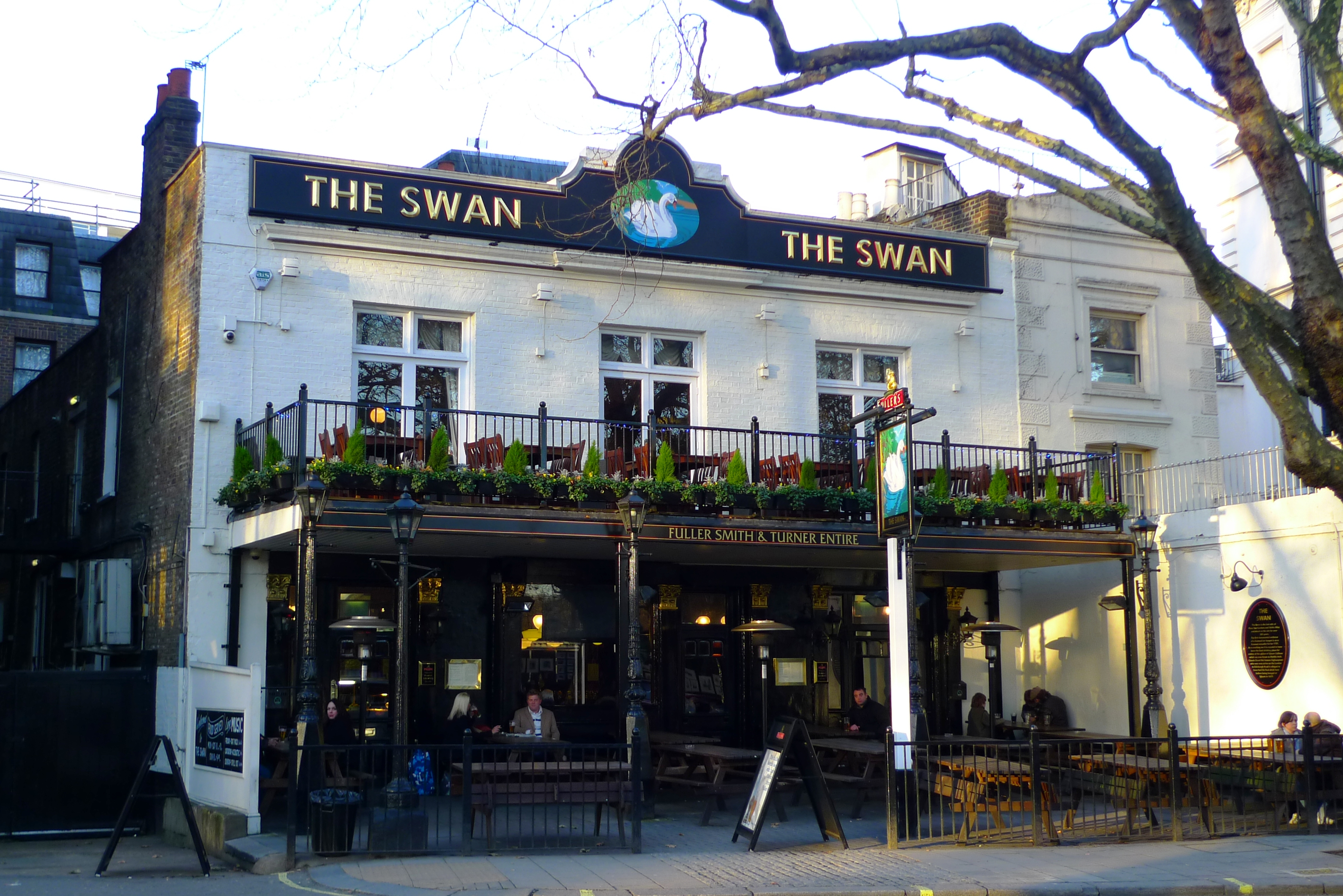
- Swan Inn in 2011

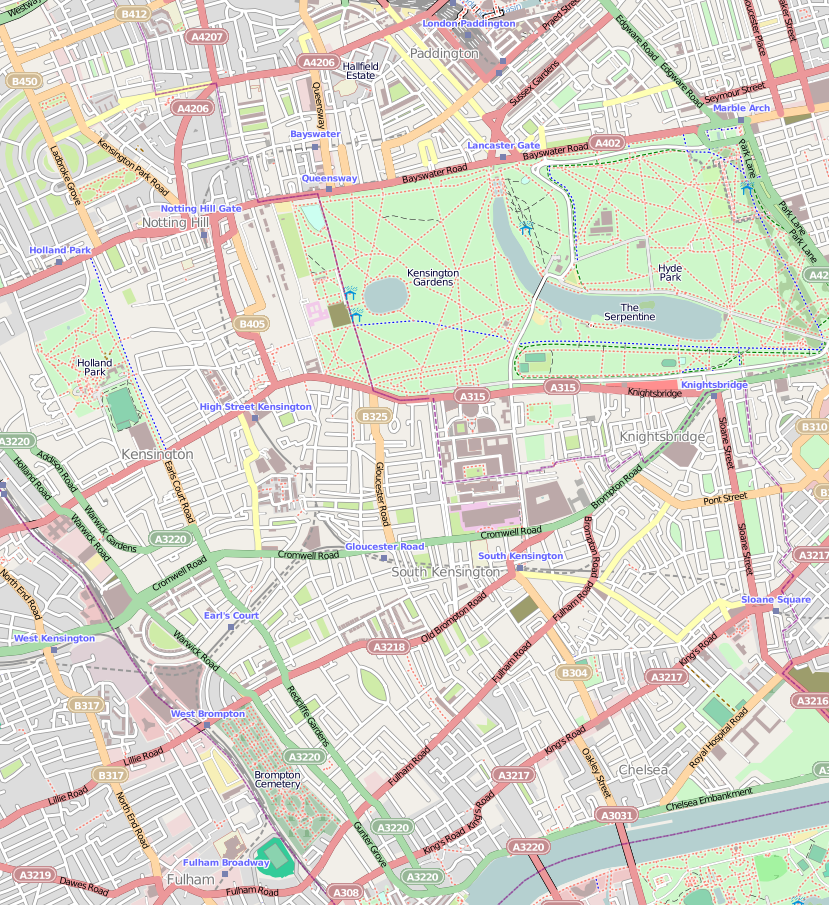
- Location within Kensington
- Former names: Saracen's Head

General information
- Type: Public house
- Location: 66 Bayswater Road, London W2 3PH, London, United Kingdom
- Coordinates: 51°30′41.6″N 0°10′37″W
- Owner: Fuller's Brewery

Website
- http://swanbayswater.co.uk/

The Swan Inn (formerly thought to have been called the Saracen's Head) is a Grade II listed pub dating back several centuries. It is located in the City of Westminster at 66 Bayswater Road, London W2. Today a popular tourist haunt at the edge of Hyde Park, run by Fuller's Brewery, it was in former times a resting point for stage coaches proceeding toward London.

The highwayman Claude Duval is reputed to have stopped here for his last drink on the way to his hanging at Tyburn in 1670.

== Sources ==
- Article in British History Online
