= Bourne Capital =

- Type: Holding Company
- Industry: Real estate investing
- Founded: 1989; 37 years ago
- Headquarters: London, England, United Kingdom
- Key people: Robert Bourne FCA (Chairman), Ben Bourne (Group Managing Director)
- Products: Property - London offices, serviced offices, retail units, markets and residential. Leisure: theatres, restaurants, bars, leisure facilities and hotels
- Services: Leisure business owners and operators in London and France
- AUM: £600 million GBP (2018)
- Website: www.bournecapital.com

Bourne Capital is a British integrated property investment and leisure group based in London. The company's main activities are focused on their ownership and active management of major London mixed use estates situated in Queensway, Waterloo as well as substantial development projects oversees. As of 2018, the company had assets of £600 million.

== History ==
Bourne Capital was founded in 1989 by Robert Bourne. Bourne was previously co-founder of Local London Group (LLG), the then market leader in the London serviced office sector. The company went public in 1986, and was sold three years later for £120 million.

Bourne Capital's ethos was based on the same formula as LLG, i.e. to generate enhanced revenues from property investments through active management and innovative marketing, however, the new company's business model was to develop and extend this concept much further.

== Holdings ==
=== London Estates ===
Within each of the London estates the company has created high-profile leisure businesses which enhance the general area, provide facilities for local businesses, tenants and residents, and, importantly, attract footfall from outside each estate. This approach to place making has resulted in high occupancies and revenues being significantly higher than could normally be achieved by traditional property investment companies.

==== Queensway ====
Bordering Hyde Park, the freehold Queensway Estate spans the top third of the street, comprising a mix of uses including over 130,000 sq ft of retail space.

Bourne Capital have been in long-term discussions with Westminster City Council regarding its proposals for the estate, which include the reconfiguration and refurbishment of the retail units; three new residential developments delivering 63 new luxury homes; two office developments providing over 52,000 sq ft of workspaces; and major public realm improvements.

==== Waterloo ====
The Waterloo Estate comprises 163,000 square feet (15,100 m^{2}) with significant properties on the island site opposite the train and underground stations. It includes offices, serviced offices, retail, restaurants and bars. Bourne Capital is planning to redevelop part of the Waterloo estate to create over 260,000 sqft of new office use.

=== London Leisure and Entertainment ===
Bourne Capital have interests in theatres, theatrical productions, leisure businesses, restaurants and bars in London. These include Queens Ice and Bowl in Queensway, Ronnie Scotts, Geisha Bar in Chinatown, the Cheyne Walk Brasserie and Waterloo Brasserie.

Old Vic Productions PLC, part of the group, is a leading UK theatrical production company chaired by Bob Diamond and whose CEO is Sally Greene. Productions have included Billy Elliot the Musical, the most successful British musical in recent years, the Vagina Monologues and many others.

==== Theatres and philanthropic activity ====
Bourne Capital have restored three important London theatres to their former glory; Richmond Theatre, the Old Vic and the Criterion. The Collins Music Hall in Islington is also currently being redeveloped. In each instance the company have restored the theatre and established a charitable trust to preserve them for the nation. Sally Greene, wife of Robert Bourne is CEO of the Old Vic, working alongside chairman, Sir Elton John. Lord Attenborough appointed by Robert Bourne and Sally Greene is chairman of the Criterion.

=== French operations ===
Bourne Capital have acquired two hotels in France, situated in St. Tropez and Courchevel, and in 2009, are launching Chateau St Tropez, the first of a series of ‘Private Palaces’ comprising a group of rental properties.

=== Special Opportunities Fund ===
With the advent of challenges in the property and finance sector, Bourne Capital established their own Special Opportunities Fund in June 2008 to co-invest ‘side by side’ with banks, institutions and joint venture partners. The purpose of the fund is to maximise the potential of assets which might otherwise be adversely affected by the financial climate. This is achieved by applying Bourne Capital's financial model of integrating property and leisure to achieve significantly enhanced returns and medium/long term planning gains.
