= Queensway, London =

Shopping street in London

Coordinates: 51.51308°N 0.18763°W

Queensway
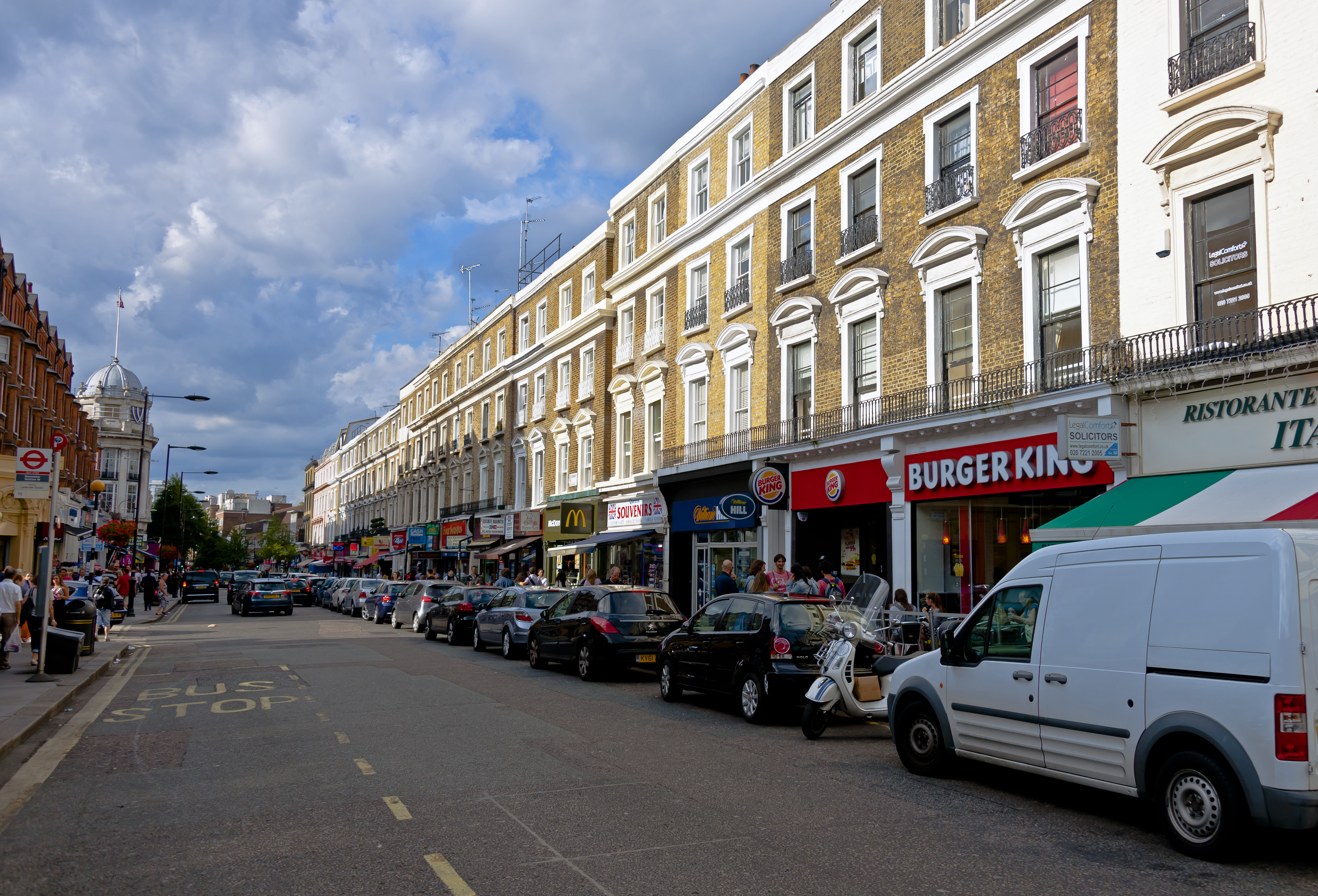
- Looking along Queensway from Hyde Park down.

- Location within City of Westminster
- Part of: B411
- Namesake: Queen Victoria
- Maintained by: Transport for London
- Length: 0.4 mi (0.64 km)
- Location: London, United Kingdom
- Nearest tube station: Queensway; Bayswater; Lancaster Gate

Other
- Known for: Whiteleys (Department Store)

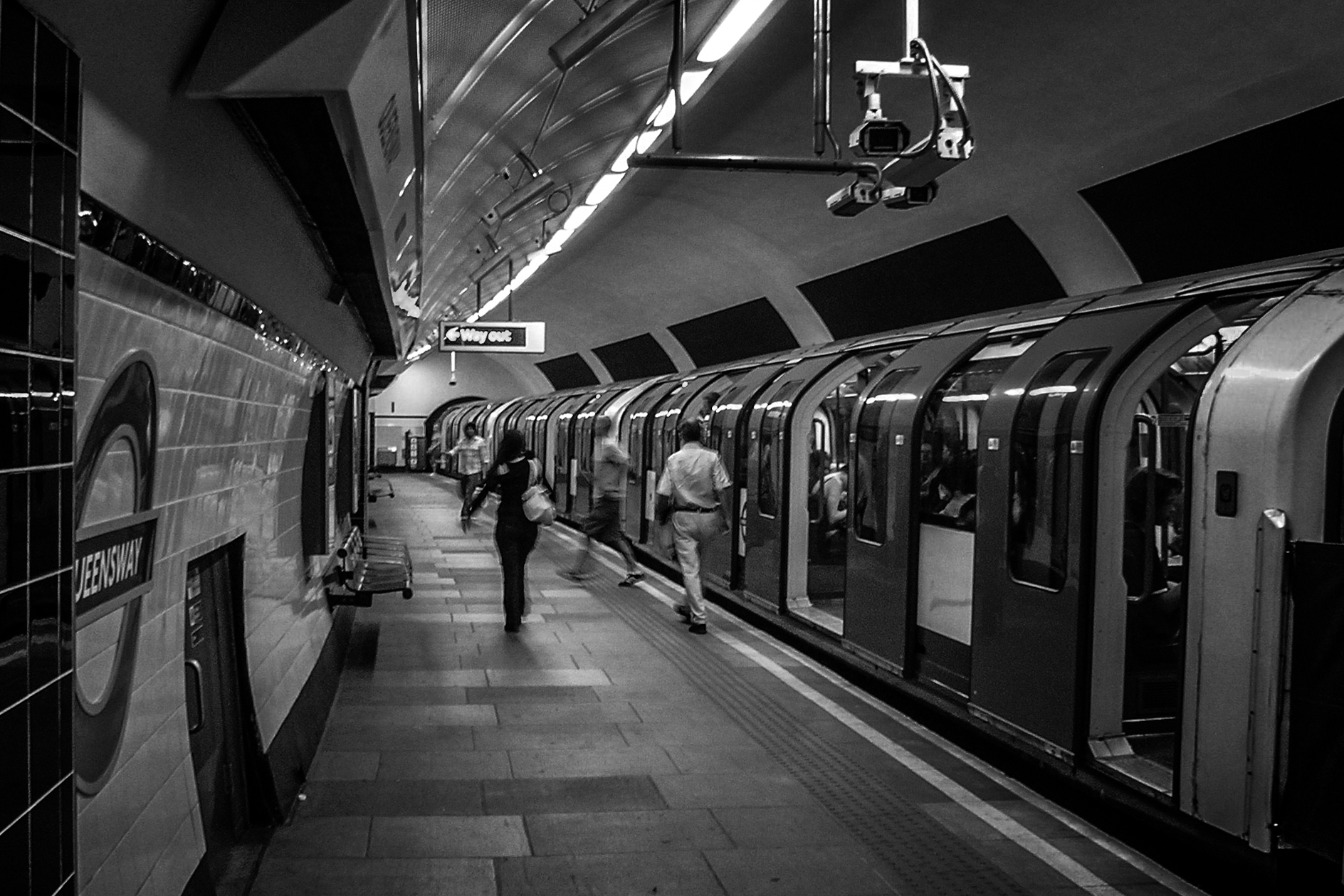
Queensway Underground Station

Queensway (formerly Queen's Road) is a shopping street in Bayswater, an area of west London. It is home to Whiteleys, many restaurants, cafés, pubs, souvenir shops and a few high-street retail chains. Queensway and Westbourne Grove are identified in the London Plan as one of 35 major centres in Greater London. The street is numbered the B411 in the British road numbering scheme. Queensway is currently undergoing a major redevelopment on all sides, with a building on the top of the road being developed for £500 million, Whiteleys for £1.2 billion and a series of other redevelopments happening at the same time.

== History ==
Bayswater and Lancaster Gate were first developed as residential suburbs of London in the early 19th century. Bayswater Road, for example, the road at the Bayswater southern end (Bayswater Road) was already a long-established route across the countryside, and a road roughly following the present Queensway can be seen on early maps running north from Bayswater Road across fields under the name of Black Lion Lane after the Black Lion Inn. It was subsequently renamed Queen's Road after 1837 in honour of Queen Victoria, who had been born at nearby Kensington Palace: a name, however, which somewhat lacked distinctiveness, for this reason the present name of Queensway was eventually substituted a century later.

Near the northern end of the street was Whiteleys, on the site of London's first department store, opened by William Whiteley in 1867. The store was awarded a Royal Warrant by Queen Victoria in 1896. The facade of the current building is from 1911, but the building itself was demolished and rebuilt in 1989.

The church of Our Lady Queen of Heaven, opposite Princess Court, was dedicated as a Roman Catholic church in 1954 by Cardinal Griffin; the Grade II listed neo-Gothic building dates from 1868, and was originally a United Methodist Free Church.

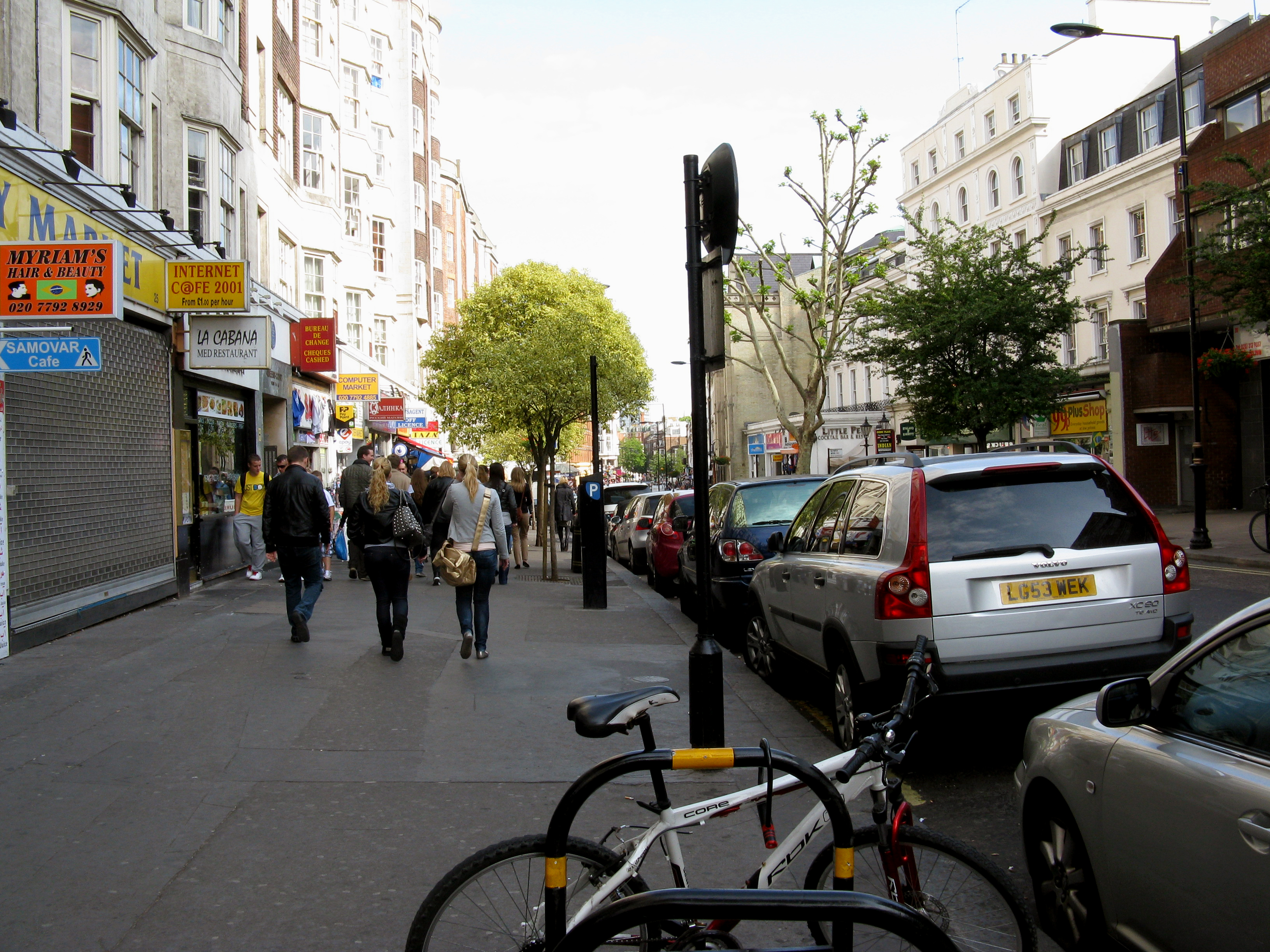
Queensway in 2011

In recent years, Queensway has become a centre for the entertainment and leisure industry in London. London's biggest ice rink, the Queen's Ice & Bowl in Queensway was recently renovated after investment and development by Robert Bourne (developer) and Bourne Capital. This has led the way for further developments in the area's entertainment and leisure industry. Queensway's retail industry is also booming with the famous Queensway Market showing significant growth in recent years.

== Modern Development ==
It is reported that a Brunei family, in conjunction with Meyer Bergman and others, has acquired a large part of Queensway, which is bordered by the Notting Hill and Kensington areas, in order to re-develop it. The purchases include the Queensway Estate, location of the ice skating rink and Queensway Market, and the Whiteley's shopping centre which was purchased from Standard Life Investments.

== Transport links ==
Bayswater and Queensway tube stations are on Queensway.

Paddington station (a westbound terminus and set of tube stations), Royal Oak, Westbourne Park, and Notting Hill Gate stations are well within a kilometre. A c. 1916 oil painting of Bayswater tube station, when known as Queens Road (Bayswater), by Walter Sickert features a man seated in a recess and an arrangement of colourful advertisements which appealed to its buyer in 1919.

== See also ==
- List of eponymous roads in London
