= Queensway tube station =

London Underground station

Queensway
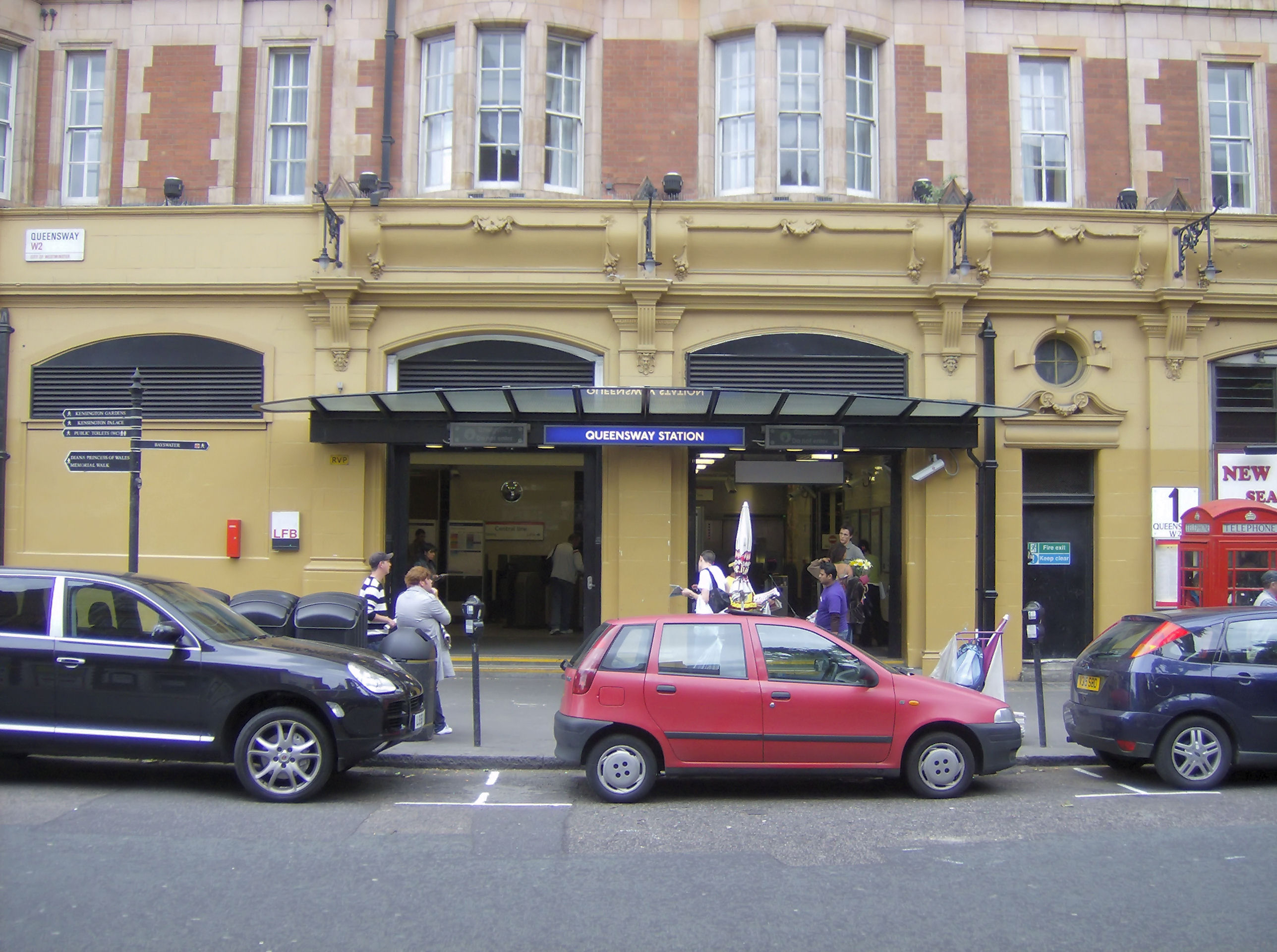
- Station entrance
- Interactive map of Queensway

General information
- Location: Bayswater
- Local authority: Westminster
- Managed by: London Underground
- Number of platforms: 2
- Fare zone: 1
- OSI: Bayswater

London Underground annual entry and exit
- 2020: ▼2.12 million
- 2021: ▲3.62 million
- 2022: ▲6.52 million
- 2023: ▼6.15 million
- 2024: ▼6.01 million

Railway companies
- Original company: Central London Railway

Key dates
- 30 July 1900: Opened as Queen's Road
- 1 September 1946: Renamed Queensway

Other information
- External links: TfL station info page
- Coordinates: 51.510444°N 0.18722°W

Queensway (/ˈkwiːnzweɪ/) is a London Underground station in Bayswater, just inside the boundary of the City of Westminster with the Royal Borough of Kensington and Chelsea. It is located at the junction of Queensway and Bayswater Road, and is opposite the north-west corner of Kensington Gardens. The station is on the Central line, between Notting Hill Gate and Lancaster Gate stations. It is in London fare zone 1.

== History ==
The station opened on 30 July 1900, as Queen's Road, and was renamed on 1 September 1946. The building is an unusual survivor of the buildings designed for the Central London Railway by Harry Bell Measures, with a flat roof so that commercial development could take place above – in this case, a hotel. The Coburg hotel opened in 1907: its design features three cupolas, over shops and Queensway station.

== The station today ==
The station was closed between 8 May 2005 and 14 June 2006 for refurbishment. These works were prompted by the need to replace the station's two (very old) lifts, which had been breaking down quite frequently prior to the station's closure. In addition the station had been modernised and re-tiled, as well as having replicas of the original lamps fitted to the façade.

Metronet, the private maintenance contractors, were originally given a deadline of 9 May 2006 to complete the works. When they failed to meet this or the revised 12 June deadline, Transport for London issued a harshly worded press release quoting London Underground Managing Director Tim O'Toole as saying "This is a further, and one hopes final, pathetic delay on a project that Metronet has failed to manage to time." The station finally re-opened on 14 June 2006.

During refurbishment, the closest station was Bayswater on the Circle and District lines, which is also located on Queensway approximately 100 metres north of the Queensway station. While the two stations are in close proximity, they are not connected.

== Connections ==
London Buses routes 70, 94, 148 and night route N207 serve the station.

Preceding station	London Underground	Following station
Notting Hill Gate towards Ealing Broadway or West Ruislip	Central line	Lancaster Gate towards Epping, Hainault or Woodford via Newbury Park
