= Bayswater =

Inner-city district of west Central London

Coordinates: 51.5095°N 0.1929°W

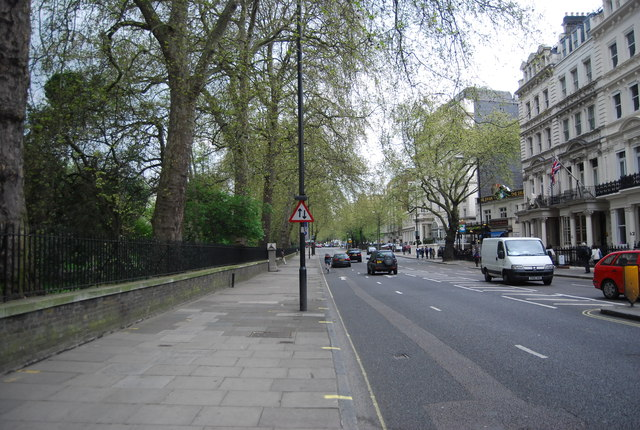
- View from Bayswater Road

- Location within Greater London
- Population: 12,363 (2020 estimate)
- OS grid reference: TQ255805
- Region: London
- Country: England
- Sovereign state: United Kingdom
- Post town: LONDON
- Postcode district: W2
- Dialling code: 020
- Police: Metropolitan
- Fire: London
- Ambulance: London
- UK Parliament: Kensington and Bayswater

Bayswater is an area in the City of Westminster. It is a built-up district with a population density of 17,500 per square kilometre, and is located between Kensington Gardens to the south, Paddington to the north-east, and Notting Hill to the west.

Much of Bayswater was built in the 1800s, and consists of streets and garden squares lined with Victorian stucco terraces; some of which have been subdivided into flats. Other key developments include the Grade II listed 650-flat Hallfield Estate, designed by Berthold Lubetkin and Sir Denys Lasdun, and Queensway and Westbourne Grove, its busiest high streets.

Bayswater is also one of London's most cosmopolitan areas: a diverse local population is augmented by a high concentration of hotels. In addition to the English, there are many other nationalities. Notable ethnic groups include Malaysians.

== Etymology ==
The name Bayswater is derived from the 1380 placename "Bayards Watering Place", which in Middle English meant either a watering place for horses, or the watering place that belonged to the Bayard family.

== History ==
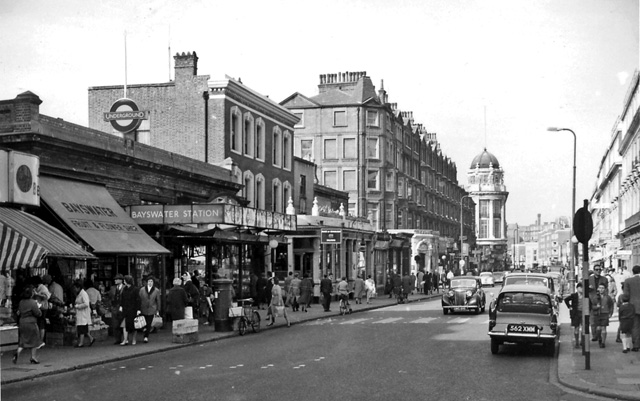
Bayswater tube station in 1961

Historically, Bayswater was located to the west of Westminster on the road from Tyburn towards Uxbridge. In the seventeenth century, it was a hamlet close to the Kensington Gravel Pits. By the end of the eighteenth century, Bayswater remained a small settlement, although the gradual expansion of Westminster westward into Mayfair and Paddington brought it closer to the outskirts of the city. During the Regency era, new suburbs were rapidly constructed to cope with the growing population of the Metropolis. An important early developer in Bayswater was Edward Orme who constructed Moscow Road and St. Petersburgh Place, which he named in honour of Alexander I of Russia. Both Bayswater and Tyburnia to the east developed independently of each other. Gradually over the following decades the remaining open spaces were built on and it became an urban area of affluent residential streets and garden squares before experiencing a period of decline after the Second World War. In the late 19th century, Bayswater became home to established Greek and Jewish communities, that each built now Grade I listed places of worship.

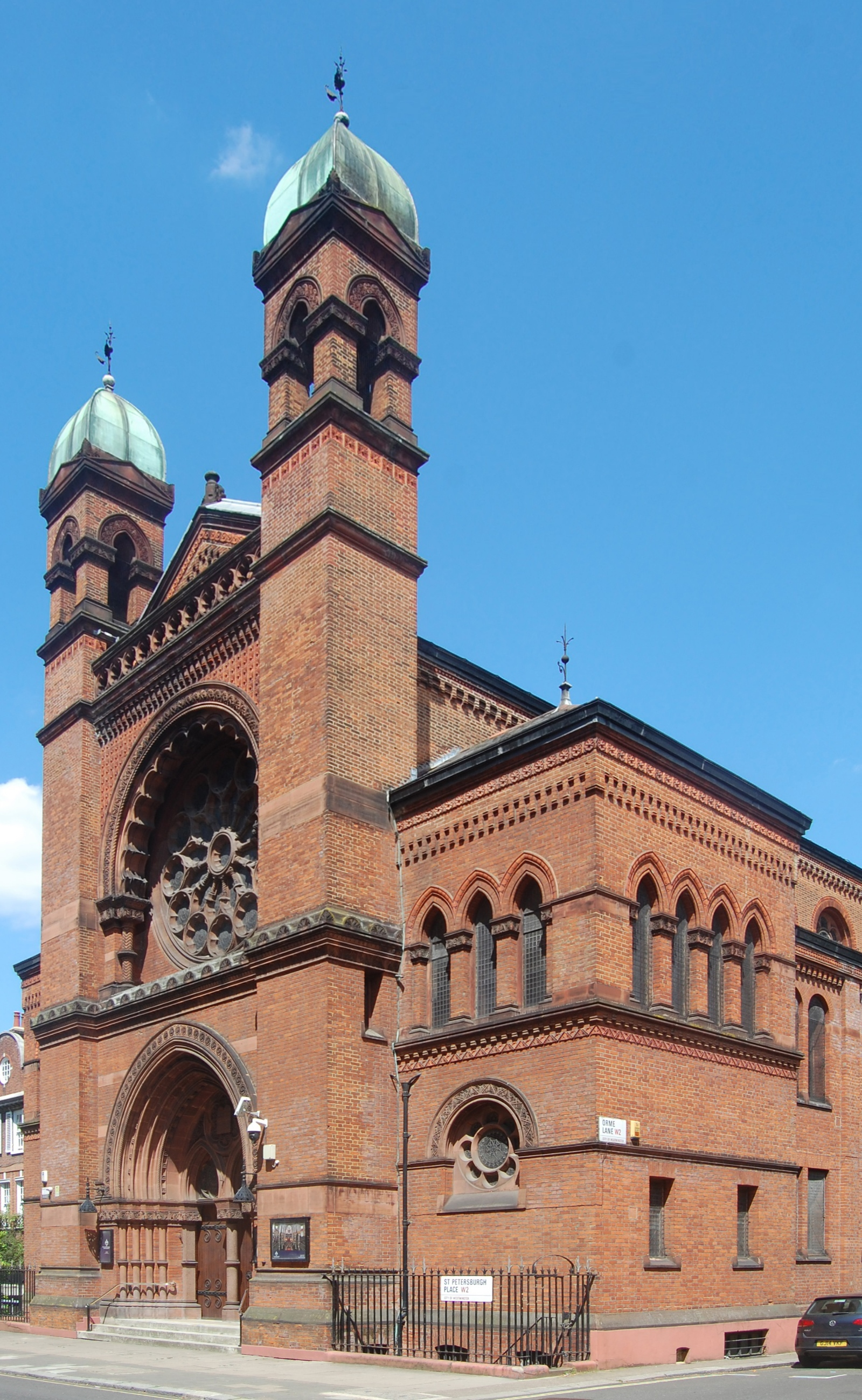
New West End Synagogue a Victorian synagogue at St Petersburgh Place

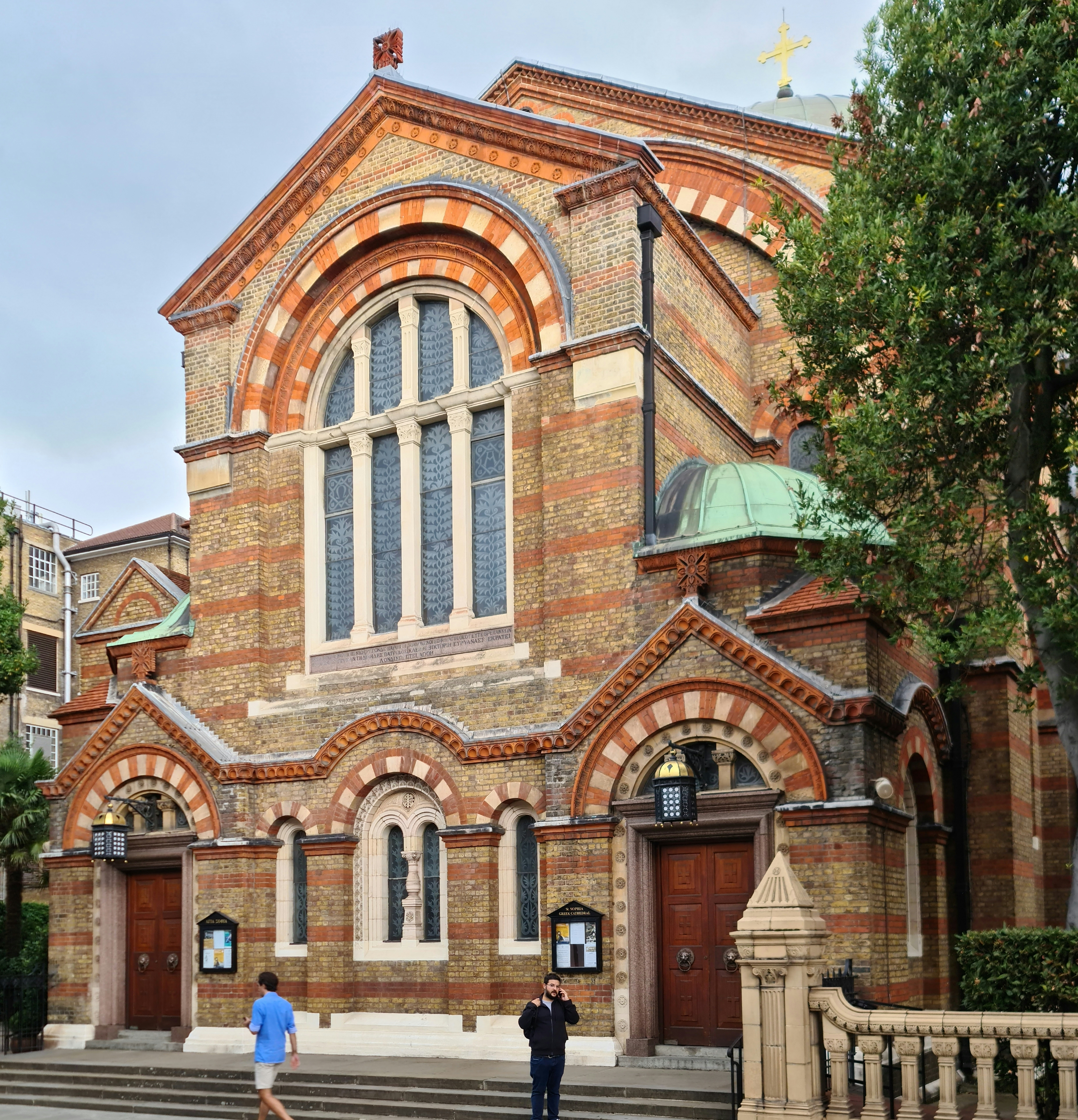
Saint Sophia Cathedral, London a Grade I listed building on Moscow Road

== Notable residents ==
- Damon Albarn
- Brett Anderson
- Mike Atherton
- J. M. Barrie, playwright and novelist, and his wife, Mary, lived at 100 Bayswater Road.
- Tony Blair
- Winston Churchill
- Richard Cobden, lived on Westbourne Terrace
- A. J. Cronin
- Umaru Dikko, former Nigerian minister of transportation
- Tim Dry has lived in Bayswater since the early 1980s.
- Ade Edmondson
- Stephanie Beacham
- Roger C. Field, inventor and designer whose first home was flat D, 15 Cleveland Square
- Alexander Fleming
- Mariella Frostrup
- Ferdinand de Géramb
- Reginald Gray, Irish artist, lived with his wife Catherine at 105a Queensway from 1958 to 1963.
- J. B. Gunn, physicist, lived with his mother, the Freudian psychoanalyst L. F. Gunn/Grey-Clarke, at 14 Durham Terrace, in the 1940s
- Francis Guthrie, whose observations led to the Four color theorem
- Alice Hart-Davis
- Thora Hird
- Paul Johnson
- Dylan Jones
- Jonathan King
- Keira Knightley
- Guglielmo Marconi, the pioneer of wireless communication, lived at 71 Hereford Road between 1896 and 1897 with his mother upon arrival in England (marked by a blue plaque).
- Rik Mayall
- Stella McCartney
- Queen Noor of Jordan
- Dermot O'Leary
- Irfan Orga, exile and writer, lived at 29, 35 and 21 Inverness Terrace from 1942 until the mid-1950s, publishing his memoirs Portrait of a Turkish Family in 1950.
- Nick Ross
- Ilyich Ramírez Sánchez, terrorist known as Carlos the Jackal
- Jennifer Saunders
- Tony Selby, lived at Basement, 1, Stanhope Place, W2 2HB
- Paul Simonon
- Sting occupied a basement flat at 28A Leinster Square in the late 1970s during the formative years of The Police. Trudie Styler, now his wife, lived in a basement flat two doors down.
- Georgina Castle Smith (pseudonym Brenda), children's writer born and bred in Bayswater
- Luigi Sturzo, Catholic priest and politician, and one of the fathers of Christian democracy and a founder of the Italian People's Party (1919)
- John Tenniel, artist and cartoonist, was born at 22 Gloucester Place, New Road, Bayswater on 28 February 1820.
- Jeremy Thorpe
- Kwasi Kwarteng

== Local politics ==
The Bayswater area elects a total of six councillors to Westminster City Council: three from the eponymous Bayswater ward, and three from Lancaster Gate ward.

Following the 2022 Westminster City Council elections, five members belong to the Labour Party, and one to the Conservative Party, with Bayswater being fully represented by Labour, and Lancaster Gate being split between the two parties. Lancaster Gate can be considered as a marginal ward.

== Nearest places ==
- Paddington
- Notting Hill
- St John's Wood
- Knightsbridge
- Little Venice
- Kensington

== Nearest tube stations ==
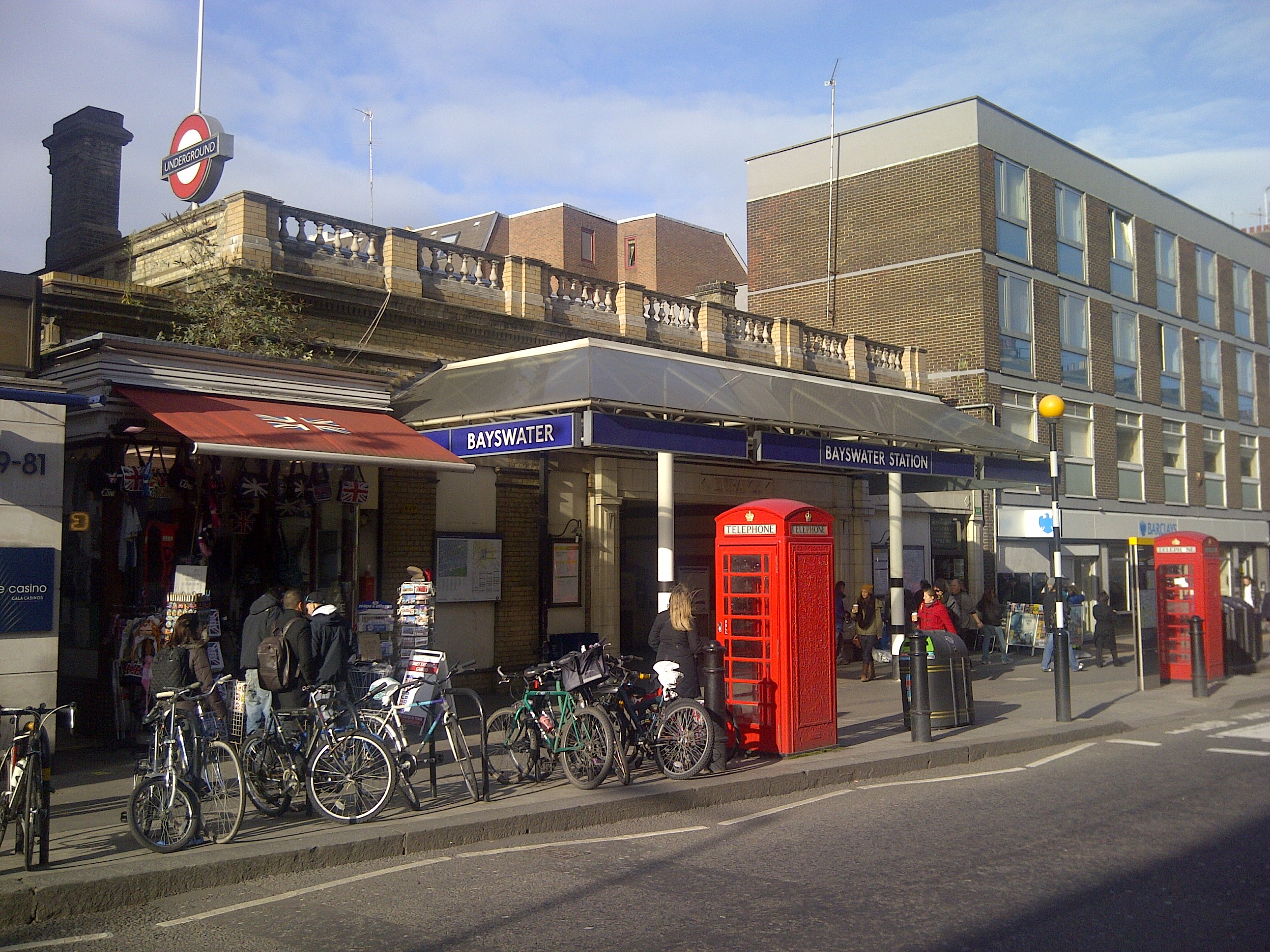
Bayswater station

The stations within the district are Bayswater and Queensway. Other nearby stations include Paddington (Bakerloo, Circle and District lines and Circle and Hammersmith & City lines), Royal Oak (in Westbourne) and Lancaster Gate (to the east).

== In Film ==
A House in Bayswater, (1959).

== Places of interest ==
- Kensington Gardens
- St Sophia's Cathedral
- The Mitre, Bayswater
- Whiteleys Shopping Centre under reconstruction

== References in fiction ==
- In John le Carré's The Spy Who Came in from the Cold, Liz is a member of the Bayswater South Branch of the Communist Party.
- In le Carré's Smiley's People, the retired Estonian general turned British spy, Vladimir, lives in a dingy flat on Westbourne Grove.
- Many of the characters in Samuel Selvon's novel The Lonely Londoners live in Bayswater.
- The Alfred Hitchcock film Frenzy was filmed in the area.
- In Martin Amis's Success, the two main characters live together in a flat in Bayswater, which he calls 'the district of transients.'
- In Oscar Wilde's The Importance of Being Earnest, Lady Bracknell indicates that the perambulator (carrying Jack, as a baby) was found "standing by itself in a remote corner of Bayswater".
- In Saki's short story "Cross Currents" (1909), Vanessa Pennington lives on a "Bayswater back street" but would have preferred "smarter surroundings."
- In Evelyn Waugh's novel Brideshead Revisited, Charles Ryder's father lives in Bayswater.
- Whiteleys is frequently seen in film, e.g. Love Actually, Closer, and was referred to in My Fair Lady as Eliza Doolittle is sent "to Whiteleys to be attired" in Pygmalion. It also has Princess Productions' studios on the top floor.
- Scenes in Alfie (1966) were filmed around Chepstow Road.
- The main character in Iris Murdoch's novel A Word Child, Hilary Burde, has a "flatlet" near Bayswater Tube Station.
- Scenes in The Black Windmill refer to, and were filmed around, the area.
- In the Italian comics series Dylan Dog the main character lives in Craven Road.
- Nick Jenkins meets Uncle Giles for tea at the Ufford Hotel, "riding at anchor on the sluggish Bayswater tide", in The Acceptance World (1955), volume three of A Dance to the Music of Time by Anthony Powell.
- Linda Stratmann's novel The Poisonous Seed is set almost entirely in Victorian Bayswater.
- In Lauren Willig's Pink Carnation Series, her character Eloise Kelly lives in Bayswater while writing her doctoral thesis.
- In Herbert Jenkins' novel, Patricia Brent, Spinster, Patricia lives at Gavin House, a boarding house in Bayswater.
- Iron Maiden released a bonus track named "Bayswater Ain't a Bad Place to Be" on their "Be Quick or Be Dead" single.

== See also ==
- In reference to the Bayswater river, refer to River Westbourne
- Aeroford – automobile manufactured in Bayswater
- Leinster Gardens – a false façade on this street hides a London Underground line from view
- Craven Hill Gardens
