= Park Modern =

Development in Queensway, London, England

Coordinates: 51.5104°N 0.1860°W

Park Modern

Park Modern is an under construction £450m mixed use development in Queensway, London, overlooking Kensington Gardens, at 117-125 Bayswater Road.

Construction will start in October 2018, once demolition of an existing hostel is complete, and will take three years. The 190,000 sq ft development will include 57 flats, priced from £2 to £30 million.

The developer is Fenton Whelan. The development has attracted controversy for it lack of affordable housing.
