= Marble Arch tube station =

London Underground station

Marble Arch
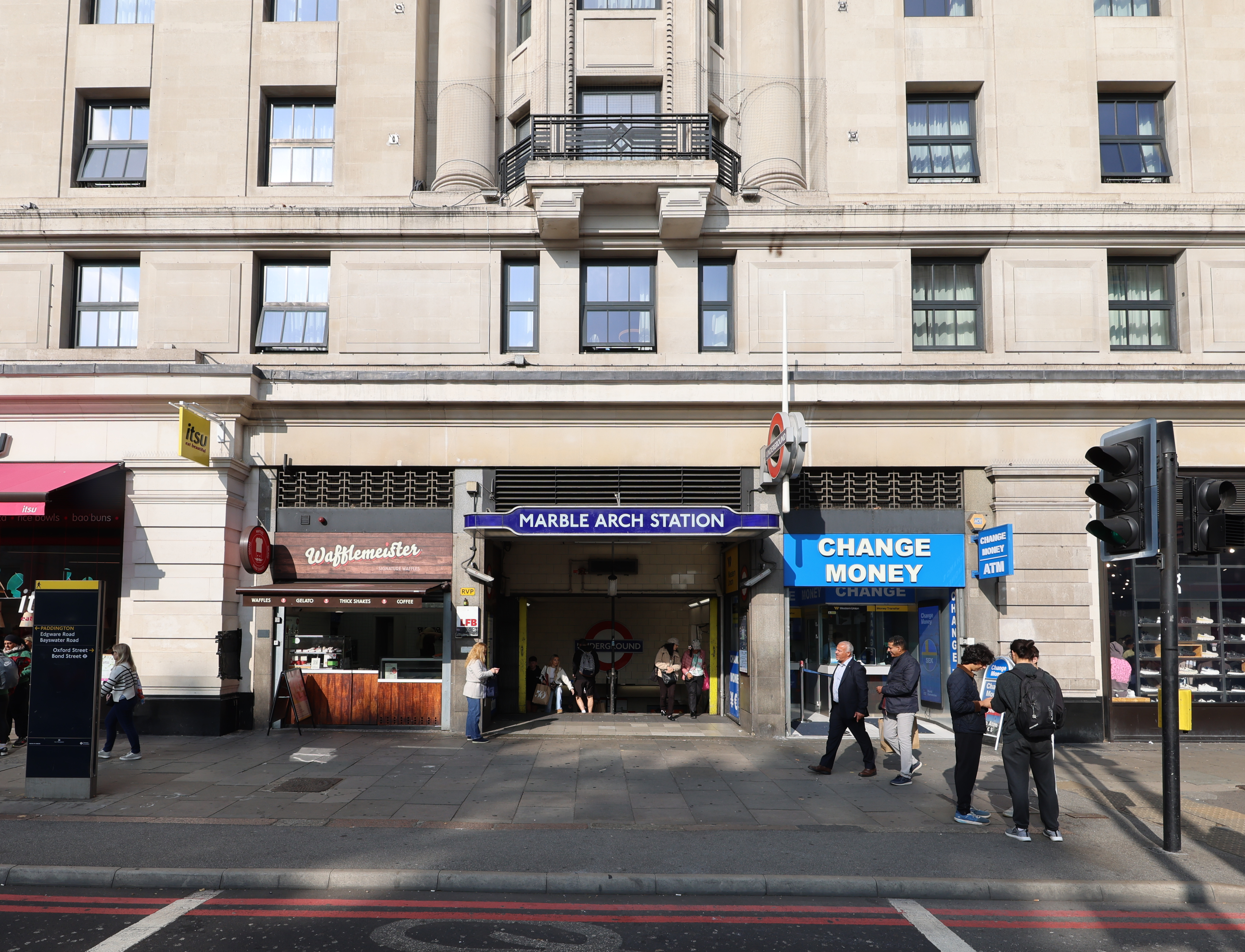
- Station entrance
- Interactive map of Marble Arch

General information
- Location: Oxford Street
- Local authority: Westminster
- Managed by: London Underground
- Number of platforms: 2
- Fare zone: 1

London Underground annual entry and exit
- 2020: ▼3.66 million
- 2021: ▲5.24 million
- 2022: ▲9.60 million
- 2023: ▼8.59 million
- 2024: ▲9.20 million

Key dates
- 30 July 1900: Opened

Other information
- External links: TfL station info page
- Coordinates: 51.51361°N 0.15833°W

Marble Arch is a London Underground station. It is located near the Marble Arch in the City of Westminster. The station is on the Central line, between Lancaster Gate and Bond Street stations. It is in London fare zone 1.

== History ==
The station was opened on 30 July 1900 by the Central London Railway (CLR).

Like all the original stations on the CLR, Marble Arch was served by lifts to the platforms but the station was reconstructed in the early 1930s to accommodate escalators. This saw the closure of the original station building, designed by the architect Harry Bell Measures, that was situated on the corner of Quebec Street and Oxford Street, and a replacement sub-surface ticket hall opened further to the west. The new arrangements came into use on 15 August 1932. The original surface building was later demolished.

The platforms, originally lined in plain white tiles, were refitted with decorative vitreous enamel panels in 1985. The panel graphics were designed by Annabel Grey.

The station was modernised in 2010, resulting in new finishes in all areas of the station, apart from the retention of many of the decorative enamel panels at platform level.

== The station today ==
The station is named after the Marble Arch nearby and is located at the north east side of the Marble Arch junction, at the western end of Oxford Street, with the main entrance in the middle of the Cumberland Hotel, where one side of it fronts onto Oxford Street.

There is a siding to the west of the station allowing trains from Epping, Hainault and Woodford to terminate here. It is not commonly used but it is still retained for emergencies and when engineering works take place.

== Incidents ==
On 27 April 2018, a 90-year old man, Robert Malpas, was suddenly and without warning pushed onto the train tracks, suffering a broken pelvis and a head wound. A bystander rescued him from the tracks, and the perpetrator - who was unknown to Malpas - was later found guilty of attempted murder and jailed for life. The incident was captured on CCTV.

== See also ==
- The Mysterious Planet, a serial of Doctor Who which uses Marble Arch as a plot point.
- Marble Arch is referenced in the country music song "London Homesick Blues".

| Preceding station | London Underground | Following station |
|---|---|---|
| Lancaster Gate towards Ealing Broadway or West Ruislip | Central line | Bond Street towards Epping, Hainault or Woodford via Newbury Park |
