= Bayswater tube station =

London Underground station

Bayswater
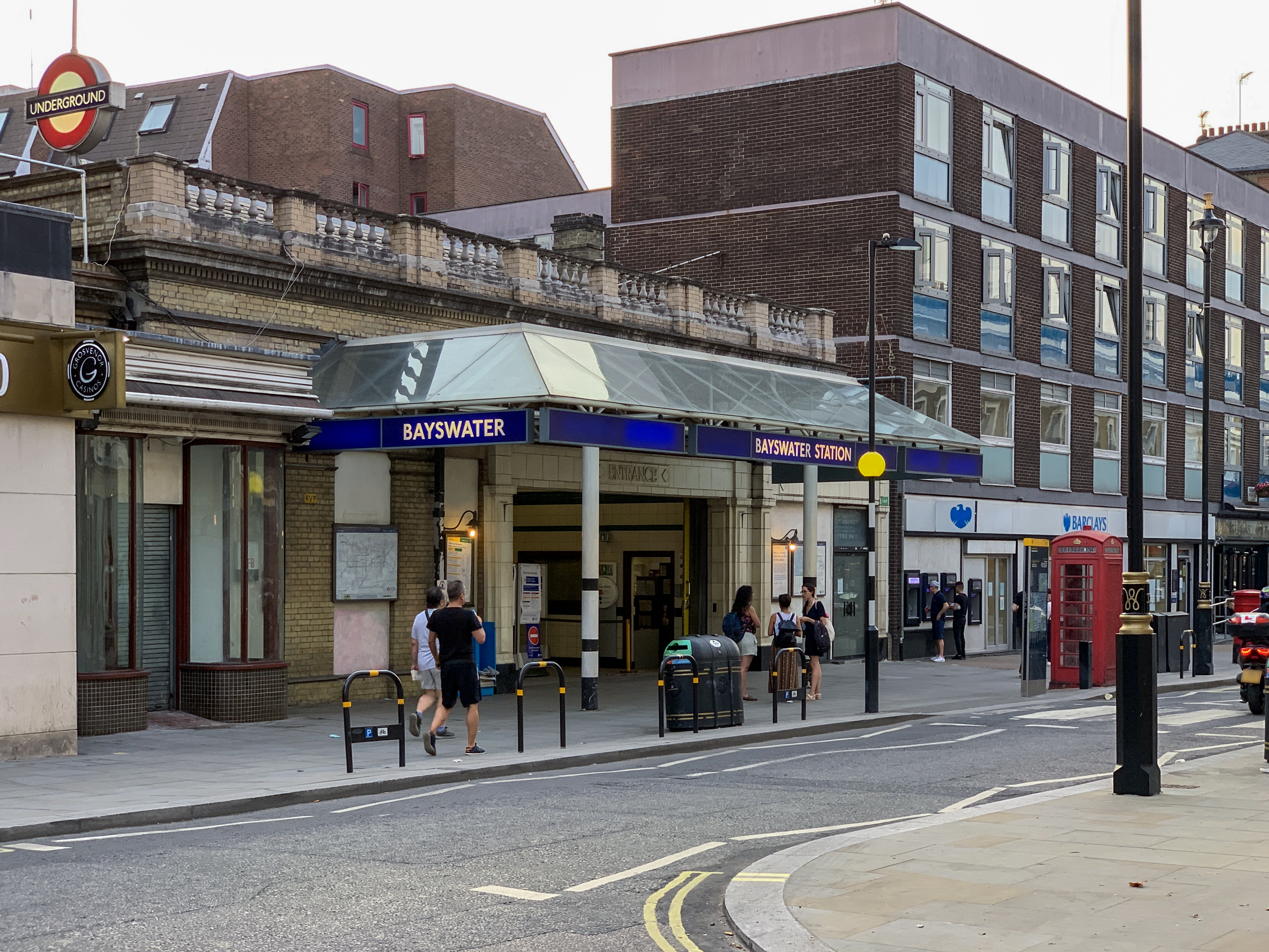
- Station entrance on Queensway
- Interactive map of Bayswater

General information
- Location: Queensway
- Local authority: City of Westminster
- Managed by: London Underground
- Number of platforms: 2
- Fare zone: 1
- OSI: Queensway

London Underground annual entry and exit
- 2021: ▲1.50 million
- 2022: ▲3.34 million
- 2023: ▲3.64 million
- 2024: ▲3.70 million
- 2025: 3.70 million

Key dates
- 1 October 1868: Opened as "Bayswater" (MR)
- 1 November 1926: Started (District) and renamed "Bayswater (Queen's Road) & Westbourne Grove"
- 1933: Renamed "Bayswater (Queen's Road)"
- 1946: Renamed "Bayswater (Queensway)" (suffix gradually dropped)
- 1949: Started (Circle)

Other information
- External links: TfL station info page
- Coordinates: 51.512°N 0.188°W

Bayswater (/ˈbeɪzˌwɔːtər/) is a London Underground station, located in the Bayswater area of the City of Westminster. It is on the Circle line and the Edgware Road branch of the District line, between Notting Hill Gate and Paddington stations. The station is less than 100 metres (330 ft) away from Queensway station on the Central line. It is in London fare zone 1.

== Location ==
The station is located on the busy Queensway tourist street and is only a few metres from Bayswater Road. It is a short walk from Portobello Market. Further north along the street is the site of the former Whiteleys shopping centre, which is currently under redevelopment. Also nearby is Westbourne Grove, Queens ice rink and bowling centre, Kensington Gardens and St Sophia's Greek Orthodox Cathedral. It is less than 100 metres (330 ft) away from Queensway station on the Central line.

== History ==
The station was opened by the steam-operated Metropolitan Railway (MR) (now the Metropolitan line) on 1 October 1868 as Bayswater, as part of the railway's southern extension to South Kensington where it connected to the District Railway (DR). Construction of the railway line, through the already developed Bayswater area required the excavation of a tunnel using the cut and cover method: a trench 42 feet (13 m) deep was excavated between brick retaining walls which was then roofed-over with brick arches to allow building work above. Large compensation payments were made to landowners affected by the excavations and, in Leinster Gardens to the east, the frontages of two houses demolished to make way for the line were reconstructed to restore the appearance of a terrace of houses. (Note: The dummy frontages at 23 and 24 Leinster Gardens remain and feature blank windows and false front doors and small porticos matching the adjacent buildings.)

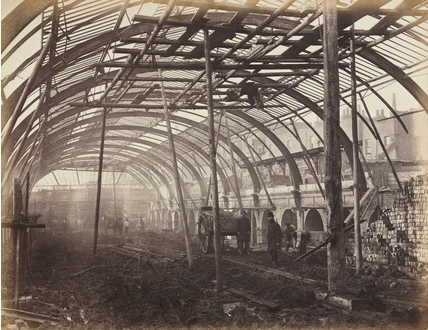
Station roof under construction

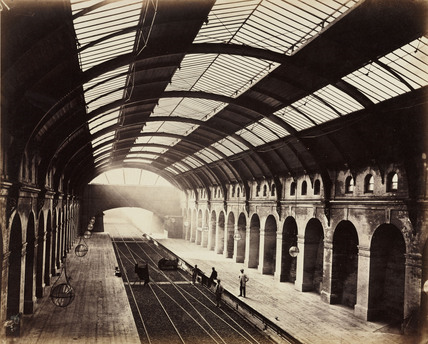
Completed station

Bayswater station, circa 1867

The platforms of Bayswater station were constructed in the trench and provided with a glazed roof. A short section of the trench was left unroofed to the west of the station to allow smoke and steam from the trains to escape from the tunnels. Even before the completion in 1884 of the continuous circuit of tracks which are now the Circle line, the MR and DR operated services through Bayswater as the Inner Circle. The MR originally provided all of the trains, but from 1871, each company operated half of the service.

In 1905, to improve the conditions in the tunnels and stations and increase service frequencies, the MR electrified the tracks through Bayswater and, in conjunction with the DR, around the whole of the Inner Circle and across most of their routes. Electric trains began running on 1 July 1905, but the MR's poor coordination of the installation work with the DR led to disruption for several months.

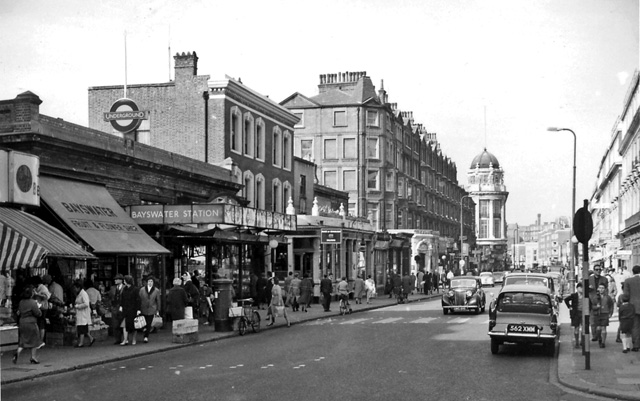
Exterior view in 1961

On 1 November 1926, the District line began a service between Edgware Road and Putney Bridge and the station was also renamed to Bayswater (Queen's Road) & Westbourne Grove. From this date the MR operated all Inner Circle services apart from a few District line operated Sunday services. The station was then renamed again to Bayswater (Queen's Road) in 1933. In 1946, it was renamed to Bayswater (Queensway) but the suffix was gradually dropped. In 1949, the service was separately identified on the tube map as the Circle line for the first time.

The station was refurbished by Metronet in 2006.

== Services ==
Bayswater station is on the Circle line and the Edgware Road branch of the District line between Notting Hill Gate and Paddington.

=== Circle line ===
The typical off-peak service in trains per hour (tph) is:

- 6tph clockwise to Edgware Road via Paddington (Praed Street)
- 6tph anti-clockwise to Hammersmith via High Street Kensington and Victoria

=== District line ===
The typical off-peak service in trains per hour (tph) is:

- 6tph eastbound to Edgware Road
- 6tph westbound to Wimbledon

There is also a morning service every day from Acton Town (Ealing Broadway on Saturdays) to Edgware Road and a late evening service from Edgware Road to Ealing Broadway on Sundays only.

Preceding station	London Underground	Following station
Notting Hill Gate towards Hammersmith via Tower Hill	Circle line	Paddington towards Edgware Road
Notting Hill Gate towards Wimbledon	District line Edgware Road branch	Paddington towards Edgware Road

== Connections ==
London Bus day, night and 24-hour bus routes serve the station.

== Incidents ==
In November 2017, a 29-year-old man attempted to murder a 55-year-old man by pushing him in front of a District line train as it was pulling in to the platform. However, the victim survived by adopting a foetal position between the rails as the train passed over him.

== In popular culture ==
Queen's Road Station, Bayswater by Walter Sickert, 1916

Bayswater tube station is the subject of a painting by Walter Sickert dating from 1916, showing the platform-sign reading 'Queen's Road (Bayswater)' beside a big advertisement for Whiteley's department store. The station was later renamed Bayswater, to avoid confusion with Queensway station, which was also named 'Queen's Road' until 1946.
