= Notting Hill Gate tube station =

London Underground station

Notting Hill Gate
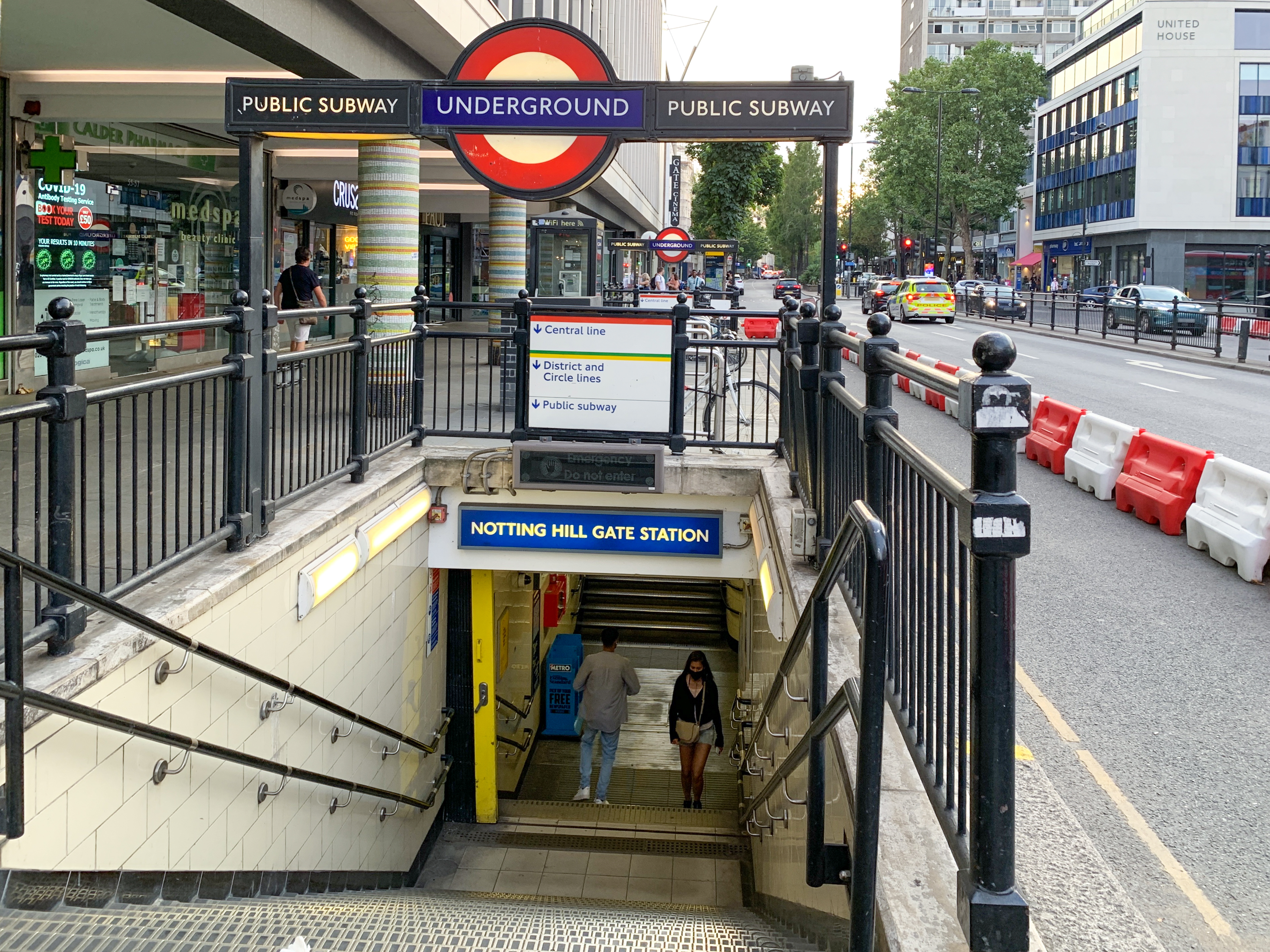
- Station entrance through a subway
- Interactive map of Notting Hill Gate

General information
- Location: Notting Hill
- Local authority: Royal Borough of Kensington and Chelsea
- Managed by: London Underground
- Owner: Transport for London
- Number of platforms: 4
- Fare zone: 1 and 2

London Underground annual entry and exit
- 2020: ▼5.68 million
- 2021: ▲6.40 million
- 2022: ▲11.69 million
- 2023: ▲12.11 million
- 2024: ▲12.83 million

Key dates
- 1 October 1868: Opened (MR)
- 30 July 1900: Opened (CLR)
- 1 March 1959: Combined Station Opened

Listed status
- Listing grade: II
- Entry number: 1225688
- Added to list: 7 November 1984; 41 years ago

Other information
- External links: TfL station info page
- Coordinates: 51.509°N 0.197°W

Notting Hill Gate is a London Underground station near Notting Hill, London. It is located on the street called Notting Hill Gate. The station is served by three lines: Central, Circle and District. On the Central line, the station is between Holland Park and Queensway stations. On the Circle line and the Edgware Road branch of the District line, it is between High Street Kensington and Bayswater stations. The station is on the boundaries of London fare zone 1 and 2.

== History ==
The sub-surface Circle and District line platforms were opened on 1 October 1868 by the Metropolitan Railway (MR) as part of its extension from Paddington to Gloucester Road. The Central line platforms were opened on 30 July 1900 by the Central London Railway (CLR). Entrances to the two sets of platforms were originally via separate station buildings on opposite sides of the road; access to the CLR platforms was originally via lifts.

The station name Notting Hill Gate had potential for confusion with the MR station to the north in Ladbroke Grove which was known as "Notting Hill" when opened in 1864, and renamed "Notting Hill & Ladbroke Grove" in 1880. This latter station eventually, in 1919, dropped its reference to Notting Hill, becoming "Ladbroke Grove (North Kensington)" in 1919 and, simply, "Ladbroke Grove" in 1938 (see Ladbroke Grove Underground station).

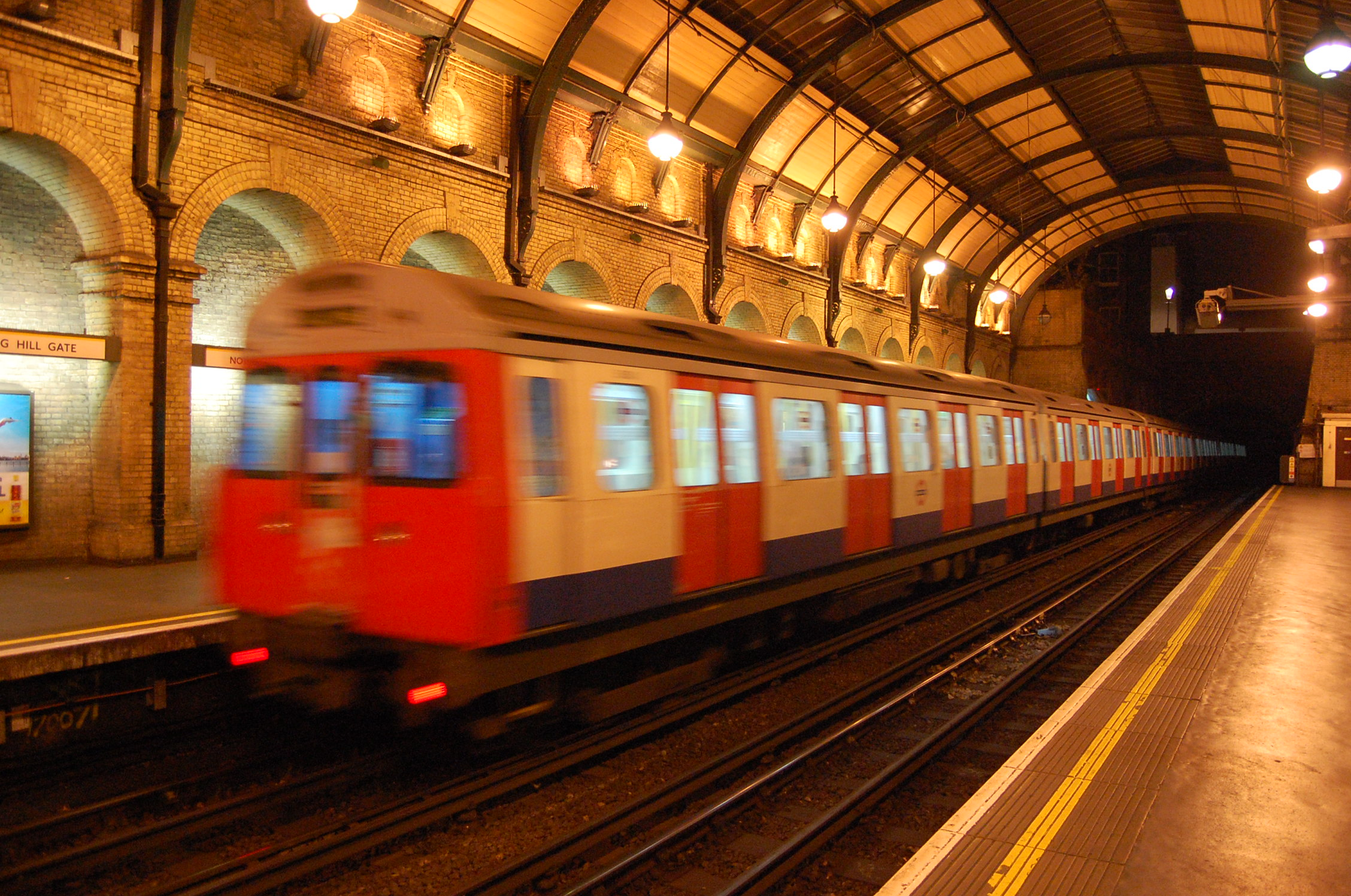
Circle and District lines platforms (2008)

On the Circle and District lines, Notting Hill Gate is a cut and cover station still covered with a glass roof, despite many other similar stations having lost theirs. The Circle and District line platforms have been a Grade II listed building since 7 November 1984.

=== Redevelopment ===
The station was rebuilt in the late 1950s and reopened on 1 March 1959, now linking the two 'Notting Hill Gate stations' on the Circle and District and Central lines, which had previously been accessed on either side of the street, with a shared sub-surface ticket hall and escalators down to the deeper Central line, replacing the aged and now sealed-off lifts. The escalators were the first on the Underground to have metal side panels rather than wooden. The new entrance also acts as a pedestrian subway under the widened Notting Hill Gate. The mosaic columns at the southern entrance were created in 2006 by local public art organisation Urban Eye.

==== Refurbishment ====
The station was refurbished from 2010 to 2011, with new ceramic tiling throughout the subway entrances, deep-level passageways and Central line tube platforms as well as a modified ticket hall layout.

During the refurbishment works an abandoned lift passageway from the original 1900 CLR station, closed to the public after Notting Hill Gate was last upgraded in 1959, was rediscovered and found to contain a series of original posters dating from the late 1950s. Images have been posted online.

A scheme was developed by the architects Weston Williamson to provide canopies over the entrances from the street, but this has not been implemented.

== Nearby places ==
- Portobello Road, famous for Portobello Market
- Kensington Palace Gardens

== Media appearances ==
In the 1968 film Otley, one of the Central line platforms at Notting Hill Gate (or a station pretending to be it) is where the assassin and coach driver Johnston, played by Leonard Rossiter, blows himself up opening a booby-trapped suitcase full of money.

The station and its staff featured prominently in the third episode of BBC Two documentary series The Tube, which first aired on 5 March 2012.

== Layout ==
The Central line westbound platform is located above the eastbound platform because when the CLR was built it did not want to tunnel under buildings, and the street above was not wide enough for the two platforms to be side by side.

== Connections ==
London Buses day and night routes serve the station, as well as Oxford Tube coaches.

Preceding station	London Underground	Following station
Holland Park towards Ealing Broadway or West Ruislip	Central line	Queensway towards Epping, Hainault or Woodford via Newbury Park
High Street Kensington towards Hammersmith via Tower Hill	Circle line	Bayswater towards Edgware Road
High Street Kensington towards Wimbledon	District line Edgware Road branch	Bayswater towards Edgware Road
