= A Word Child =

Book by Iris Murdoch

- Cover of the first edition
- Author: Iris Murdoch
- Cover artist: Christopher Cornford
- Language: English
- Publisher: Chatto and Windus
- Publication date: 1975
- Publication place: United Kingdom
- Media type: Print (Hardback & Paperback)
- Pages: 392pp

A Word Child is a novel by Iris Murdoch. Published in 1975, it was her 17th novel.

First published in 1975 by Chatto and Windus, A Word Child charts the trials and tribulations of the title character, the "word child", Hilary Burde as he attempts to recover his soul from the misery of his troubled past. Filled in the usual Murdoch style with an array of colourful, fully rounded characters who people Hilary's world, the novel is a complex and thoughtful exploration of the possibility and meaning of redemption, the nature of human memory, and the possibility of love for the tarnished soul. It was met with great critical acclaim on its release, and praised as a simultaneously stirring, witty, painful and joyous novel.
