= Preferred Hotels & Resorts =

International hotel chain

- Type: Private
- Industry: Hospitality
- Founded: 1968
- Headquarters: Newport Beach, CA, United States
- Number of locations: Nearly 40
- Area served: Worldwide
- Key people: John Ueberroth (Executive Chairman); Gail Ueberroth (Chief Creative Officer & Vice-Chairman); Lindsey Ueberroth (CEO); Casey Ueberroth (Member of the Board of Directors)
- Services: sales, marketing, distribution, quality assurance, and technology solutions
- Owner: John Ueberroth; Gail Ueberroth; Lindsey Ueberroth; Casey Ueberroth
- Number of employees: 300+
- Website: preferredhotels.com

Preferred Hotels & Resorts is a hotel chain that represents more than 650 independent hotels, resorts, and residences, across 85 countries. The company's corporate headquarters is in Newport Beach, California. It does not own, operate, or manage any of the hotels. All of the hotels, resorts, and serviced residences in the company's portfolio are independent entities.

Lindsey Ueberroth is CEO of the company.

== History ==
Preferred Hotels & Resorts was founded by twelve North American hoteliers in 1968, originating as a referral organization for hotels.

In 1981, the association rebranded under the name Preferred Hotels Worldwide, and ended the personal referral system previously used for membership. The 1990s saw increased transformation as Preferred Hotels Association became a for-profit stock corporation. During this decade, the company also developed a 1,600-point inspection used to determine a hotel’s muster for inclusion in the group. Further advancements were made in the company’s electronic distribution platform, and Preferred opened its first international sales offices. In 2000, the company created a new holding company called IndeCorp (Independent Hotel Corporation).

=== Leadership and name change ===
In 2004, John Ueberroth became the largest shareholder of IndeCorp and was named CEO and chairman, along with his wife Gail Ueberroth as vice chairman, and his daughter Lindsey Ueberroth as executive vice president. Ueberroth was a travel industry executive who had previously been a major shareholder of the Ambassadors International travel company together with his brother, former Commissioner of Baseball Peter Ueberroth. By 2005, Casey Ueberroth had also joined the family business as a managing director for the western United States. That same year, the company changed its name to Preferred Hotel Group.

In 2014, the company entered its 10th year as a privately owned family business, implementing a succession plan with Lindsey Ueberroth as president and CEO, John Ueberroth as chairman, Gail Ueberroth as vice chairman and Casey Ueberroth as chief marketing officer. In March 2015, the company rebranded, with five distinct hotel collections: Legend, LVX, Lifestyle, Connect, and Preferred Residences.

Preferred Hotels & Resorts is managed by parent company Preferred Hotel Group, Inc., which also manages Historic Hotels of America, Historic Hotels Worldwide, PHG Consulting, and Beyond Green Travel.
