= Lancaster Gate tube station =

London Underground station

Lancaster Gate
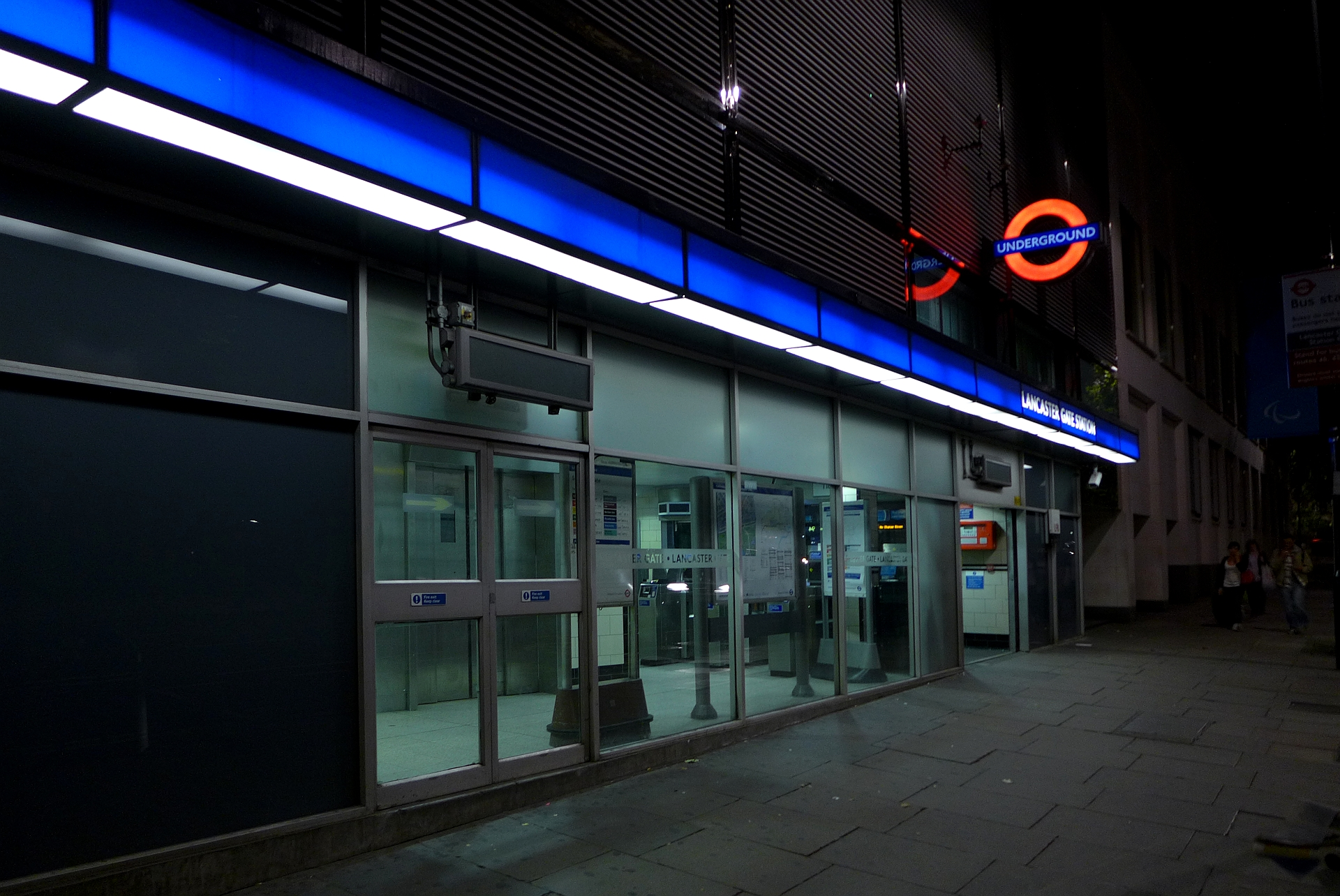
- Station entrance
- Interactive map of Lancaster Gate

General information
- Location: Paddington
- Local authority: Westminster
- Managed by: London Underground
- Number of platforms: 2
- Fare zone: 1
- OSI: Paddington

London Underground annual entry and exit
- 2020: ▼1.50 million
- 2021: ▲2.67 million
- 2022: ▲3.65 million
- 2023: ▼3.17 million
- 2024: ▼3.09 million

Key dates
- 30 July 1900: Opened

Other information
- External links: TfL station info page
- Coordinates: 51.51175°N 0.175472°W

Lancaster Gate is a London Underground station. It is located near Lancaster Gate on Bayswater Road in Paddington, to the north of Kensington Gardens, adjacent to the Royal Lancaster Hotel. The station is on the Central line, between Queensway and Marble Arch stations. It is in London fare zone 1.

== History ==
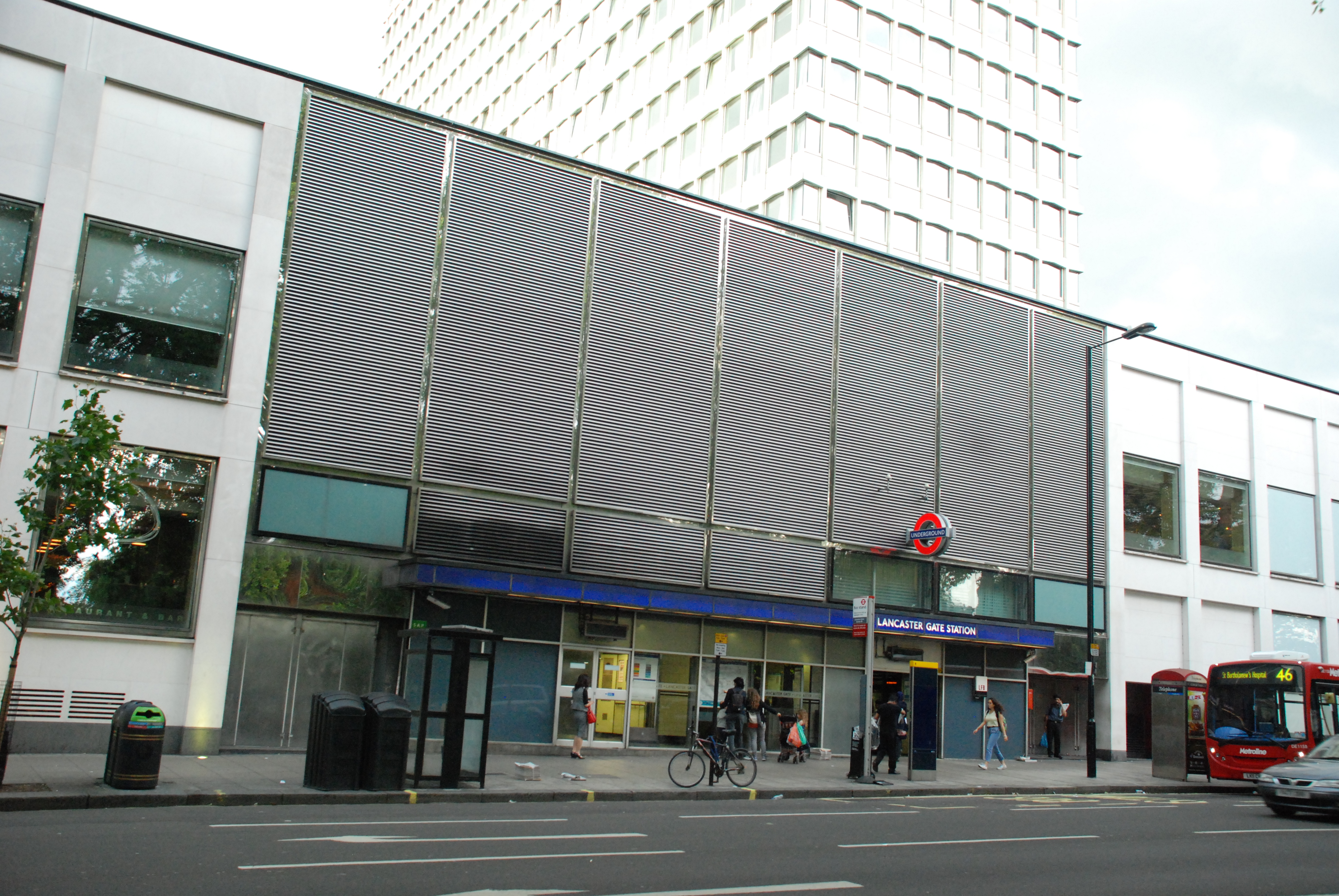
The station in 2015

Lancaster Gate station was opened on 30 July 1900 by the Central London Railway (now the Central line). The original station building was typical of the work of the line's original architect Harry Bell Measures. It was demolished and a new surface building constructed as part of the development above in 1968. The development was designed by T P Bennett & Son as an office block but converted soon after into a hotel. In 2004–05 the lower floors of the hotel were re-clad in white stone to a design by Eric Parry Architects. The hotel received planning permission for the re-cladding to include the station façade.

=== Refurbishment ===
Lancaster Gate was closed from July to November 2006 so that the lifts and other parts of the station could be refurbished. The station's chronic lift failures were considered by Transport for London to be a safety hazard and an inconvenience to passengers. Patronage has increased over the years and as a result the station's small ticket hall area is often congested, especially at weekends.

Lancaster Gate station was also closed from January to June 2017 for complete replacement of the lifts. Due to the small size of the station, it was not feasible to do one lift at a time, so it was deemed necessary to close the entire station.

== Location ==
Despite its name, the station is close to the Marlborough Gate entrance to Hyde Park/Kensington Gardens, about 300m to the east of the Lancaster Gate entrance.

The station is within walking distance of Paddington station, providing a convenient interchange between the Central line and the main line station, although this is not highlighted on the Underground map. Transport for London's September 2011 report "Central London Rail Termini: Analysing passengers' onward travel patterns" did not include using Lancaster Gate as a means of getting from Paddington to the Central line.

== Connections ==
London Buses routes 94, 148, 274 and night route N207 serve the station

Preceding station	London Underground	Following station
Queensway towards Ealing Broadway or West Ruislip	Central line	Marble Arch towards Epping, Hainault or Woodford via Newbury Park
