= Court of St James's =

Official royal court of the British Monarch

The Court of St James's serves as the official royal court for the Sovereign of the United Kingdom. The court formally receives all ambassadors accredited to the United Kingdom. Likewise, ambassadors representing the United Kingdom are formally accredited from this court.

The marshal of the Diplomatic Corps, known as Master of the Ceremonies before 1920, serves as the liaison between the British monarch and foreign diplomatic missions. The marshal is stationed permanently at St James's Palace. As of 1886, there were merely six ambassadors in London, while 37 other countries were represented by ministers. (The custom, developed in the 18th century, was that only monarchies sent ambassadors, while others sent ministers; this distinction was abrogated toward the end of the 19th century.) By 2015, the number of foreign missions accredited to the Court of St James's had risen to 175, including 47 high commissions from Commonwealth countries and 128 embassies from non-Commonwealth countries.

Official meetings and receptions related to the court, such as Privy Council meetings or the annual Diplomatic Reception attended by 1,500 guests, typically take place wherever the monarch is in residence—usually at Buckingham Palace.

== Origin of the name ==
The Court of St James's derives its name from St James's Palace, hence the possessive 's at the end of the name. This nomenclature is due to St James's Palace being the most senior royal palace, despite Buckingham Palace being the primary metropolitan residence of all British sovereigns (except Charles III) since the accession of Queen Victoria in 1837. The court's name is sometimes wrongly pronounced as the "Court of St James", excluding the appropriate "iz" pronunciation of the possessive "s" suffix.

== See also ==
- Diplomatic rank
- His Majesty's Diplomatic Service
- List of diplomatic missions in the United Kingdom
- List of diplomatic missions of the United Kingdom
