= Royal Borough of Kensington and Chelsea =

Borough in London, England

Coordinates: 51.50°N 0.19°W

- London borough, Royal borough
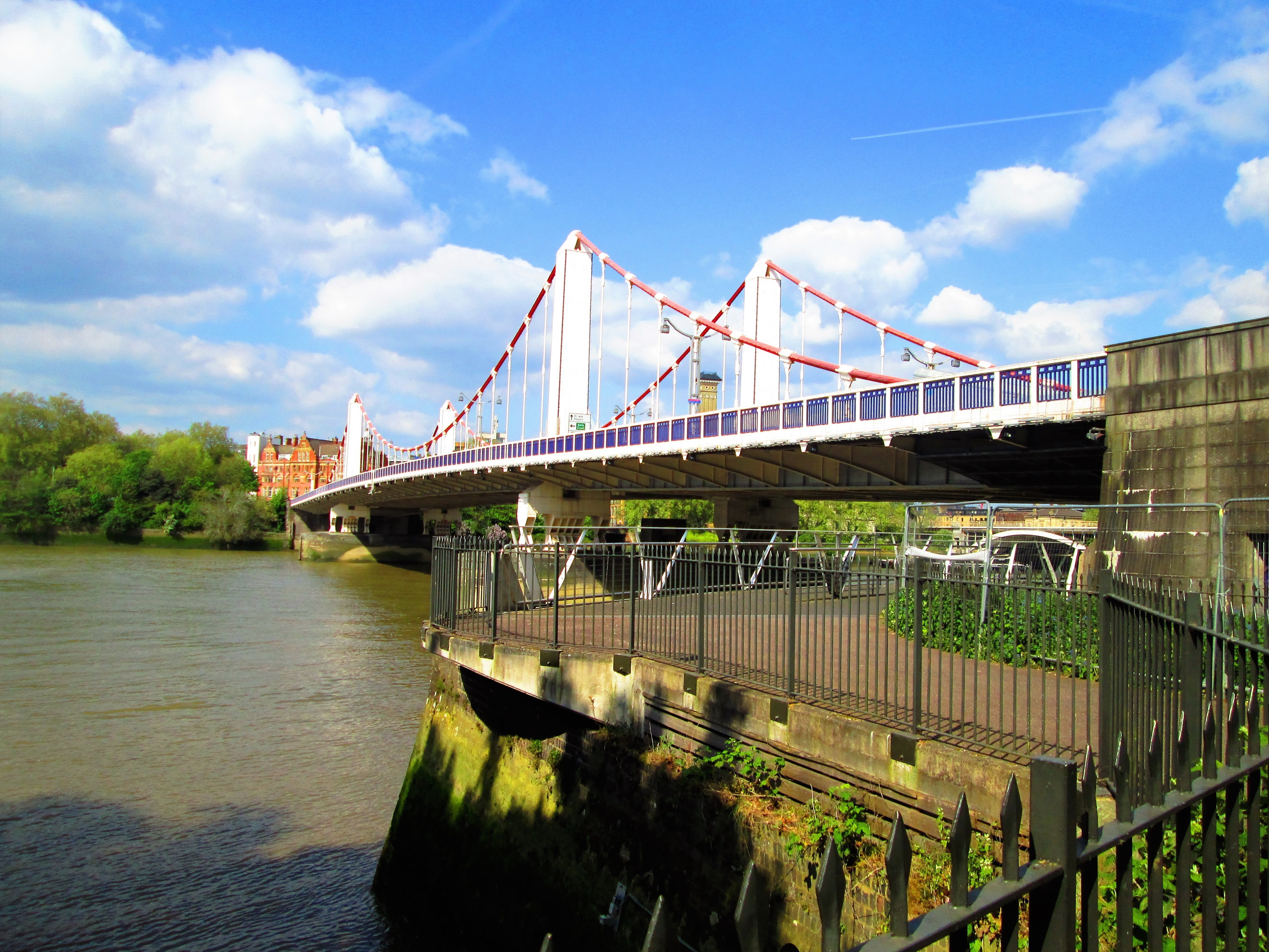
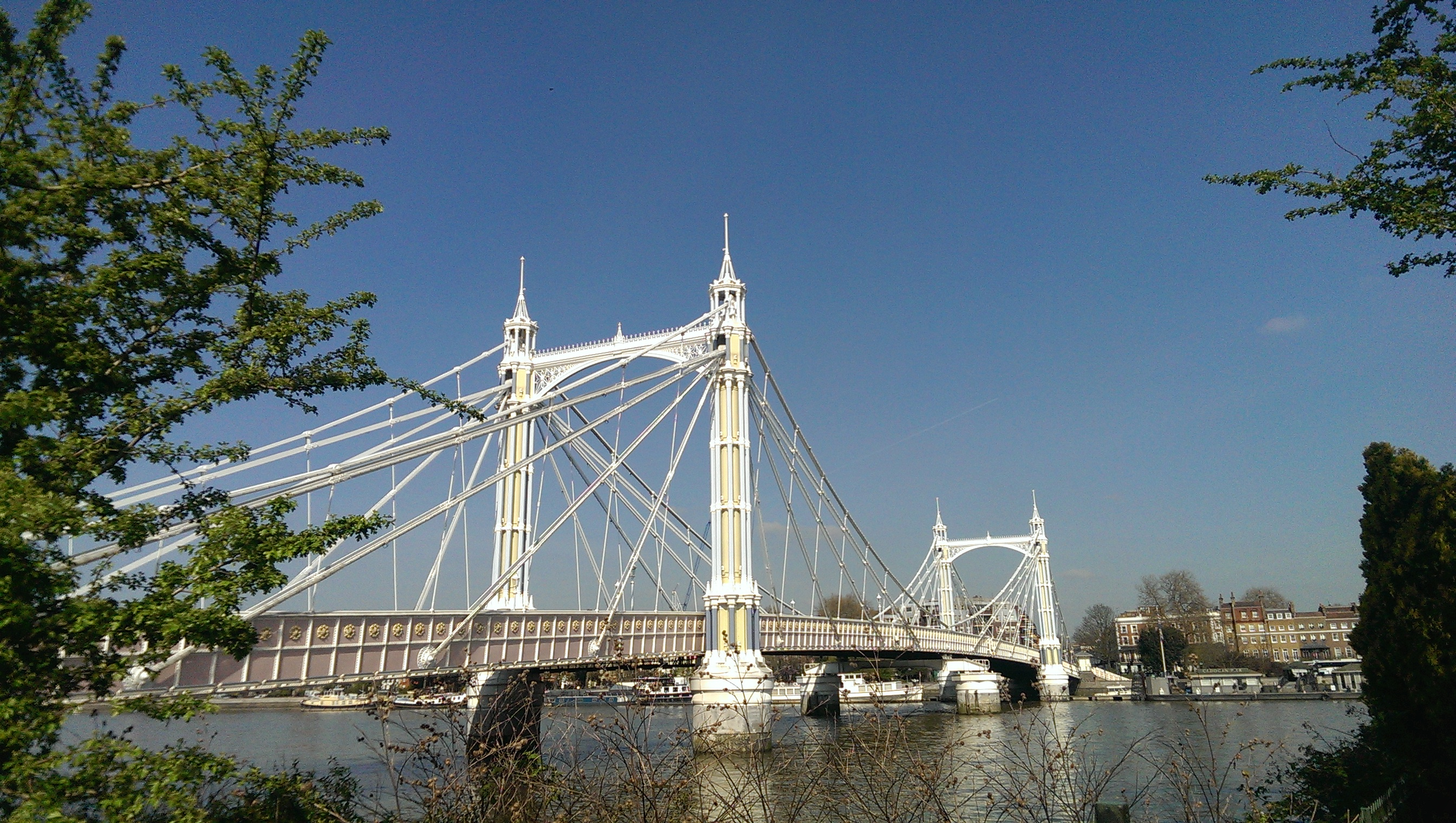
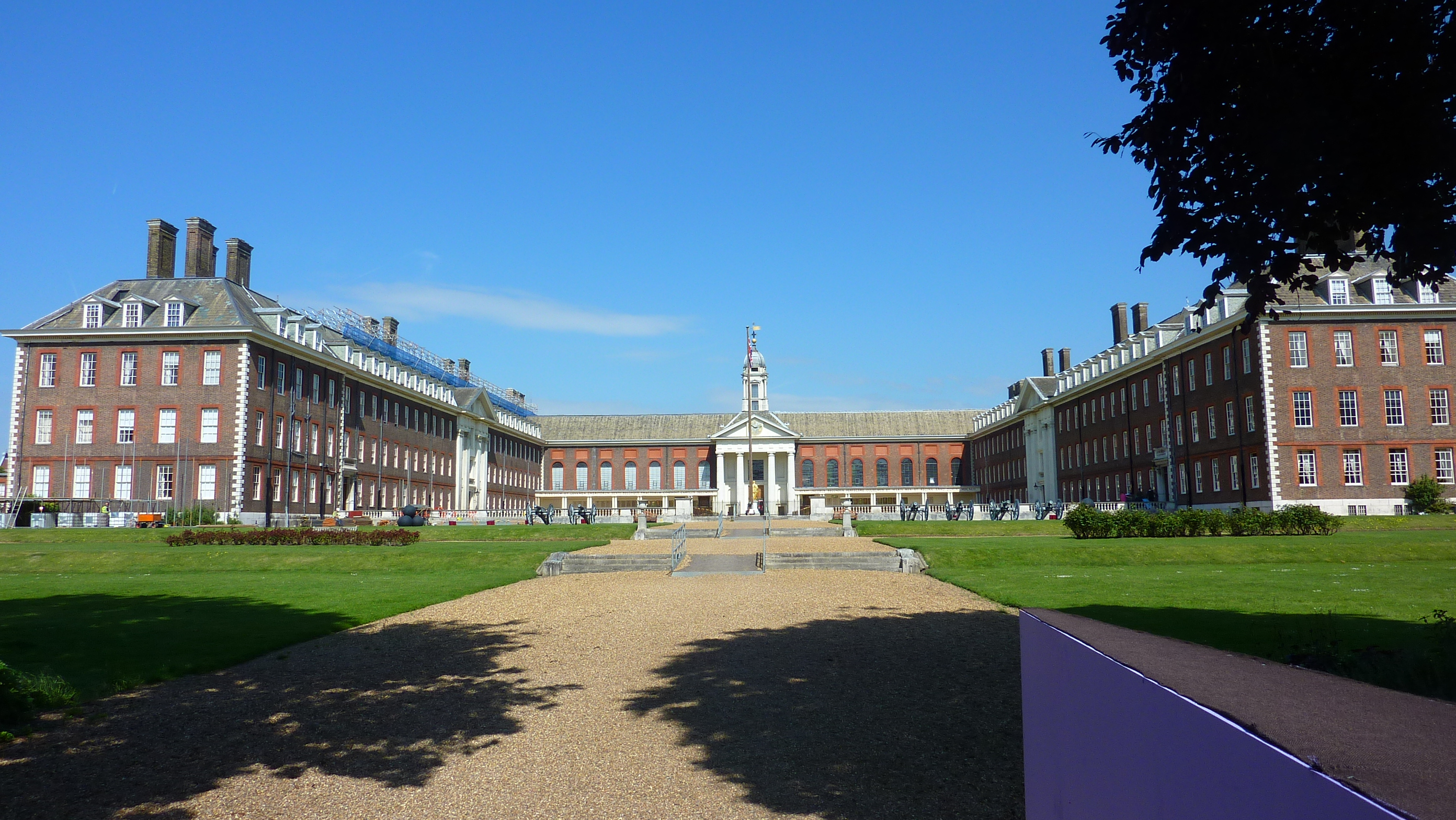
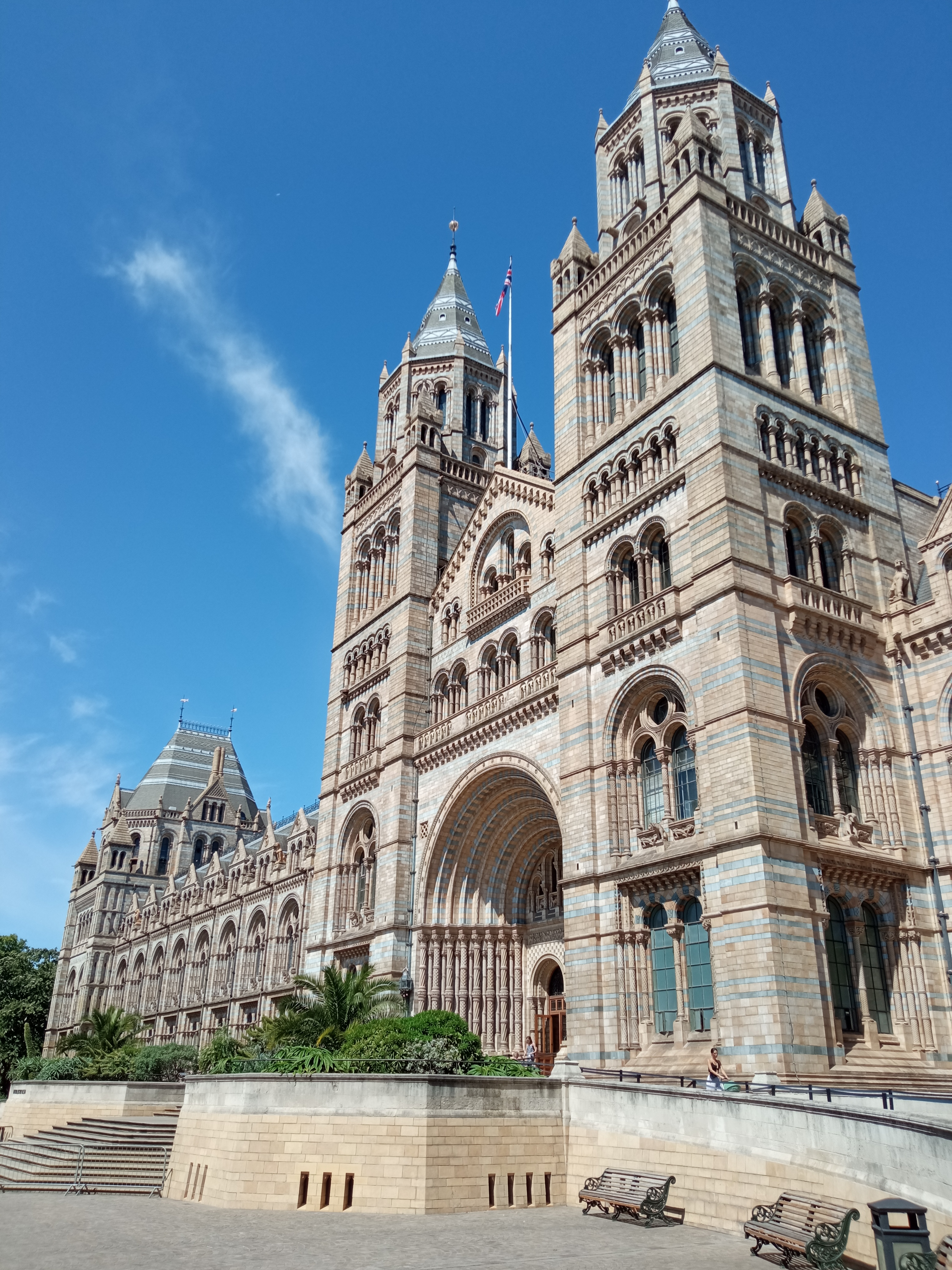
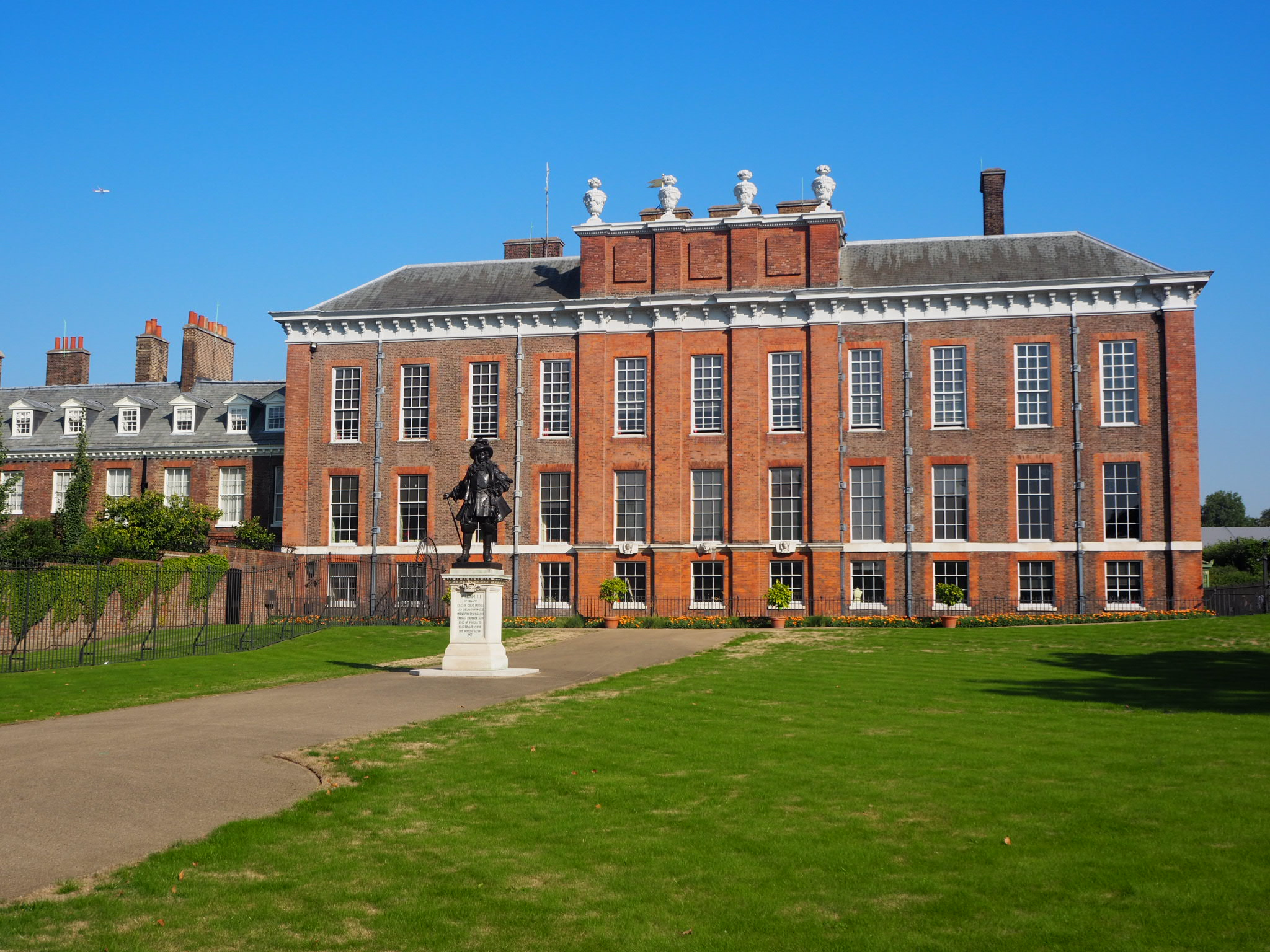
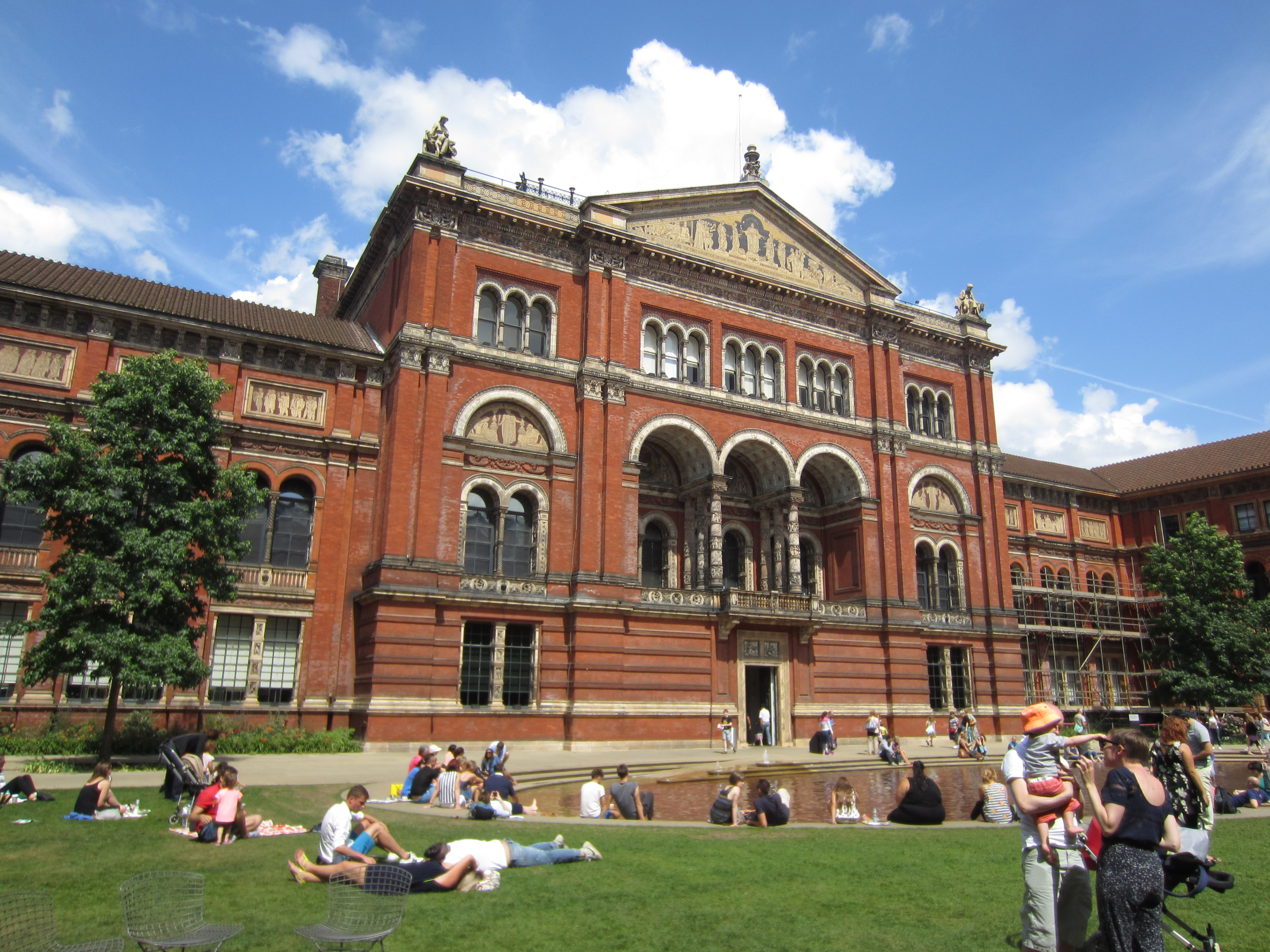
- Left to right; Top: Chelsea Bridge; Upper: Albert Bridge and Royal Hospital Chelsea; Lower: Natural History Museum and Kensington Palace; Bottom: Victoria and Albert Museum

- Coat of arms Council logo
- Motto: ‘’Quam bonum in unum habitare’’ (What a good thing it is to dwell together in unity)
- Kensington and Chelsea shown within Greater London
- Sovereign state: United Kingdom
- Constituent country: England
- Region: London
- Ceremonial county: Greater London
- Created: 1 April 1965
- Admin HQ: Holland Street

Government
  - Type: London borough council
  - Body: Kensington and Chelsea London Borough Council
  - London Assembly: James Small-Edwards (Labour) AM for West Central
  - MPs: Joe Powell (Labour); Ben Coleman (Labour)

Area
  - Total: 4.68 sq mi (12.13 km^{2})
  - Rank: 295th (of 296)

Population (2025)
  - Total: 145,734
  - Rank: 159th (of 296)
  - Density: 31,120/sq mi (12,010/km^{2})
- Time zone: UTC (GMT)
  - Summer (DST): UTC+1 (BST)
- Postcodes: NW, SW, W
- Area code: 020
- ISO 3166 code: GB-KEC
- ONS code: 00AW
- GSS code: E09000020
- Police: Metropolitan Police
- Website: www.rbkc.gov.uk

The Royal Borough of Kensington and Chelsea (often known by its initialism as RBKC) is an Inner London borough with royal status. It is the smallest borough in London and the second smallest district in England; it is one of the most densely populated administrative regions in the United Kingdom. It includes affluent areas such as Notting Hill, Kensington, South Kensington, Chelsea, and Knightsbridge.

The borough is immediately west of the City of Westminster, east of the London Borough of Hammersmith and Fulham, south of the London Borough of Brent and north of the London Borough of Wandsworth across the River Thames. It contains major museums and universities in South Kensington, department stores such as Harrods, Peter Jones and Harvey Nichols, and embassies in Belgravia, Knightsbridge and Kensington Gardens. The borough is home to the Notting Hill Carnival, Europe's largest, and contains many of the most expensive residential properties in the world, as well as Kensington Palace, a British royal residence.

The local authority is Kensington and Chelsea London Borough Council. Its motto, adapted from the opening words of Psalm 133, is Quam bonum in unum habitare, which translates roughly as 'How good it is to dwell in unity'.

== History ==
Chelsea and Kensington were both ancient parishes in the historic county of Middlesex. From 1856 the two parishes were in the area governed by the Metropolitan Board of Works, which was established to provide services across the metropolis of London. In 1889 the Metropolitan Board of Works' area was made the County of London. From 1856 until 1900 the lower tier of local government within the metropolis comprised various parish vestries and district boards, with both Chelsea and Kensington being governed by their respective vestries. In 1900 the lower tier was reorganised into metropolitan boroughs, two of which were called Chelsea and Kensington, corresponding to the two parishes. The borough of Kensington was given the honorific title of royal borough in 1901.

The modern borough was created in 1965 under the London Government Act 1963, which reorganised 86 boroughs and urban districts into 32 London boroughs and also created the Greater London Council. It was a merger of the old metropolitan boroughs of Chelsea and Kensington, and it inherited Kensington's royal borough status. The new borough was originally intended to be called only "Kensington", but after protests from thousands of Chelsea residents, the then Minister of Housing and Local Government, Sir Keith Joseph, announced on 2 January 1964 that the name of the new borough would be the Royal Borough of Kensington and Chelsea.

Of its history the council states: "Despite the boroughs being separate originally, Kensington and Chelsea still retain their unique characters. Even the amalgamation of the two boroughs, unpopular as it was at the time, has been accepted. Today conservation combined with the adoption of sympathetic new architecture is seen as a key objective. In every corner of the borough signs of its history can be seen: from Grade 1 listed buildings Kensington Palace and the Royal Hospital, Chelsea to others recalled in street names such as Pottery Lane and Hippodrome Mews."

In 200 years the area has been transformed from a "rural idyll" to a thriving part of the modern metropolis. Chelsea had originally been countryside upon which Thomas More built Beaufort House. He came to Chelsea in 1520 and built the house, which in his day had two courtyards laid out between the house and the river, and in the north of the site acres of gardens and orchards were planted. It was from here in 1535 that More was taken to the Tower and beheaded later that year. This area of Cheyne Walk continued its historic significance; nearby Crosby Hall sits on the river near the Church of Thomas More, and what was once Thomas Carlyle's residence remains on Cheyne Row.

Kensington's royal borough status was granted in 1901 as it included of Kensington Palace, where Queen Victoria was born in 1819 and lived until her accession in 1837. Commissioned by King William III, Christopher Wren enlarged and rebuilt the original house in 1689, turning it into a fitting royal residence. With the King came many court officials, servants and followers. Kensington Square, until then a failing venture, became a popular residential area. The Palace was regularly used by reigning monarchs until 1760 and since then by members of the Royal family. Kensington's royal borough status was inherited by the new borough.

In the 19th century the last emperor of the Sikh Empire, Maharaja Duleep Singh who was brought to England as a child following the Second Anglo-Sikh War, along with the Koh-i-Noor diamond, lived in the borough at 53 Holland Park, while his mother Maharani Jind Kaur (wife of Maharaja Ranjit Singh) lived at the nearby Abingdon House till her death in 1846.

During the Second World War civilians suffered great hardship; there were some 800 deaths and 40,000 injuries. A huge army of civilian volunteers was raised, including Auxiliary Fire Service, Red Cross, Air Raid Wardens and Rescue Services. During the Blitz much damage was caused by explosive and incendiary bombs, especially along Chelsea's riverside. But worse was to come in 1944 with the arrival of the V2 rockets, or flying bombs. Among the buildings either destroyed or seriously damaged, usually with terrible loss of life, were Chelsea Old Church, Church of Our Most Holy Redeemer, Our Lady of Victories, St Mary Abbots, St Stephens Hospital, St Mary Abbots Hospital, Sloane Square tube station, World's End, the Royal Hospital and Holland House.

== Districts ==
Areas in the borough include:

- Albertopolis
- Bayswater (also partly in the City of Westminster)
- Belgravia (also partly in the City of Westminster)
- Brompton
- Chelsea
- Chelsea Harbour (also partly in the London Borough of Hammersmith and Fulham)
- Earl's Court
- Holland Park
- Kensal Green (also partly in the London Borough of Brent)
- Kensington
- Knightsbridge (also partly in the City of Westminster)
- Ladbroke Grove
- North Kensington
- Notting Hill
- South Kensington
- West Brompton
- West Kensington (also partly in the London Borough of Hammersmith and Fulham)
- World's End

== Parks and open spaces ==
Most parks and open spaces in this borough are quite small, the majority being squares built to service houses around them. However, the area does contain larger parks, including Kensington Gardens and parts of Hyde Park, as well as parts of the Magnificent Seven cemeteries.

== Governance ==
The local authority is Kensington and Chelsea Council, which is based at Kensington Town Hall on Horton Street.

=== Greater London representation ===
Since 2000, for elections to the London Assembly, the borough forms part of the West Central constituency.

=== UK Parliament ===
The borough is divided between two constituencies represented in the House of Commons of the Parliament of the United Kingdom: Kensington and Bayswater, held by Joe Powell for the Labour Party, and Chelsea and Fulham (partly in Hammersmith & Fulham), held by Ben Coleman for the Labour Party.

At the 2005 General Election, the borough was divided differently:

- Kensington and Chelsea, held by Sir Malcolm Rifkind for the Conservative Party, and
- Regent's Park and Kensington North (partly in City of Westminster), held by Karen Buck for the Labour Party.

Rifkind held the Kensington seat until the 2015 General Election when he stood down after becoming embroiled in a scandal, uncovered by a television investigation, over accepting money in return for access to influential British diplomats and politicians.

Evolution of parliamentary constituencies in RBKC
Until 1868	From 1868	From 1885	From Feb 1974	From 1997	From 2010	From 2024
Middlesex	Chelsea	Kensington North	Kensington	Part of Regent's Park and Kensington North	Kensington	Part of Kensington and Bayswater
Middlesex	Chelsea	Kensington South	Kensington	Kensington and Chelsea	Kensington	Part of Kensington and Bayswater
Middlesex	Chelsea	Chelsea		Kensington and Chelsea	Part of Chelsea and Fulham	

=== Diplomatic missions ===
Within the Royal Borough of Kensington and Chelsea, Kensington Palace is located on Kensington Palace Gardens—a tree-lined avenue that is home to embassies and high commissions, with additional diplomatic missions throughout the borough:

High Commissions

- Bangladesh
- Cameroon
- Cyprus
- Dominica
- Fiji
- Gambia
- Mauritius
- Pakistan
- Saint Vincent and the Grenadines
- Zambia

Embassies

- Armenia
- Belarus
- Denmark
- Ecuador
- Estonia
- Gabon
- Greece
- Guatemala
- Iraq
- Israel
- Jordan
- Lebanon
- Mongolia
- Morocco
- Nepal
- The Netherlands
- Paraguay
- Peru
- The Philippines
- Romania
- Russian Federation
- Slovakia
- Thailand
- Ukraine
- Uzbekistan
- Venezuela
- Vietnam
- Yemen

== Demographics ==
Population pyramid of the Borough of Kensington and Chelsea in 2021

Population census
Year	Pop.	±%
1801	22,088	—
1811	31,085	+40.7%
1821	43,296	+39.3%
1831	55,865	+29.0%
1841	46,807	−16.2%
1851	69,379	+48.2%
1861	128,828	+85.7%
1871	188,277	+46.1%
1881	247,725	+31.6%
1891	258,015	+4.2%
1901	250,267	−3.0%
1911	242,884	−3.0%
1921	243,589	+0.3%
1931	244,297	+0.3%
1941	233,377	−4.5%
1951	223,144	−4.4%
1961	205,598	−7.9%
1971	189,571	−7.8%
1981	125,892	−33.6%
1991	145,171	+15.3%
2001	158,922	+9.5%
2011	158,649	−0.2%
2021	143,373	−9.6%
2024 estimate	144,518	+0.8%
Note: 2024 estimate

At the 2011 census, the borough had a population of 158,649 who were 71 per cent White, 10 per cent Asian, 5 per cent of multiple ethnic groups, 4 per cent Black African and 3 per cent Black Caribbean. It is the least populated of the 32 London boroughs. Due to its high French population it has long held the unofficial title of the 21st arrondissement of Paris.

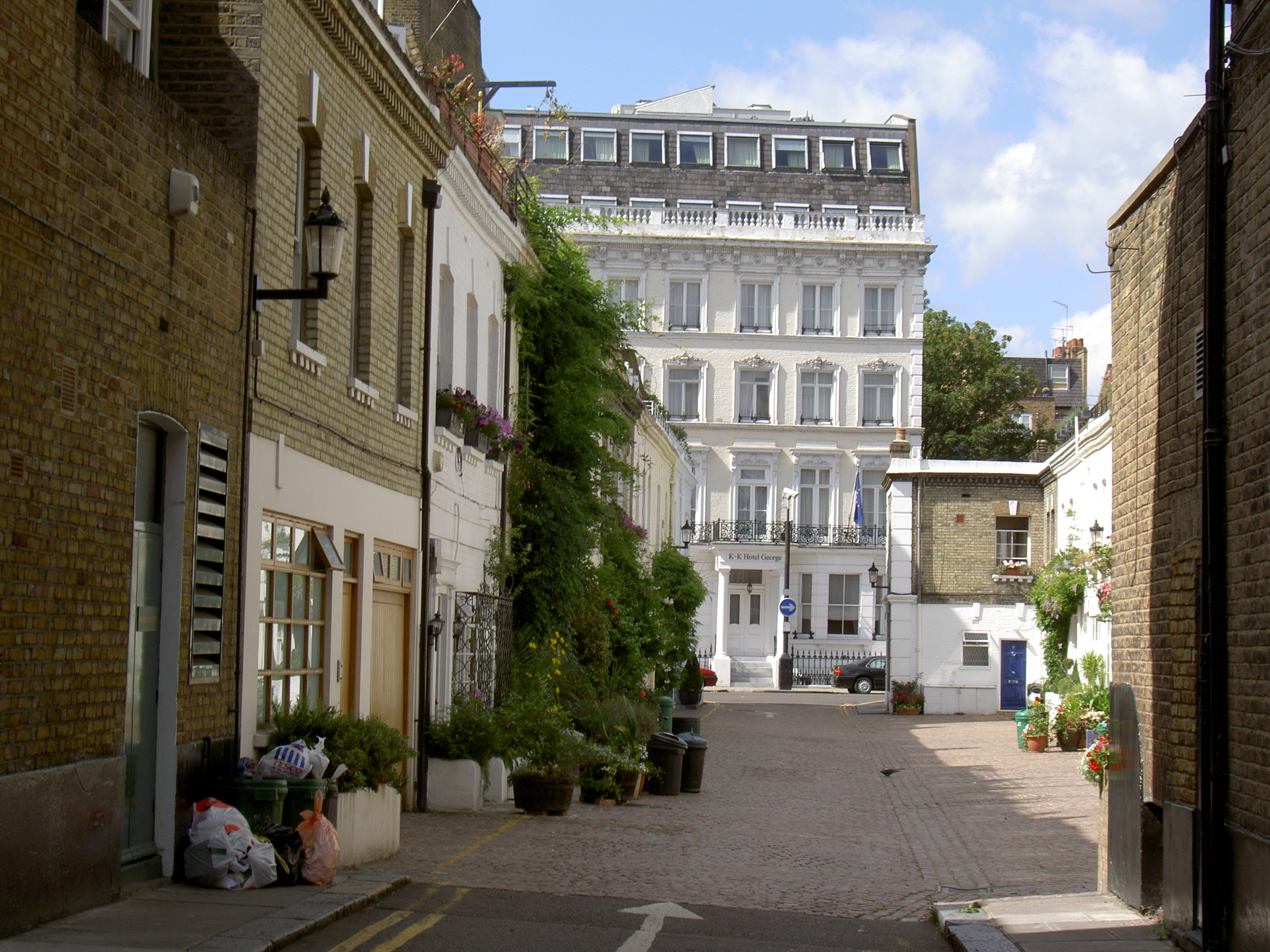
A typical mews in the Royal Borough of Kensington and Chelsea

In 2005, the borough had more of its land covered by domestic buildings than anywhere else in England at 19%, over half the national average. It also had the fifth highest proportion of land covered by non-domestic buildings at 12 percent.

As of 2010 statistics released by the Office for National Statistics showed that life expectancy at birth for females was 89.8 years in 2008–2010, the highest in the United Kingdom. Male life expectancy at birth for the same period was 85.1 years. The figures in 1991–1993 were significantly lower: 73.0 years for males (ranking 301st in the nation) and 80.0 for females (ranking 129th). Further investigation indicates a 12-year gap in life expectancy between the affluent wards of Chelsea (Royal Hospital, Hans Town) and the most northerly wards of North Kensington (Golborne, Dalgarno), which have high levels of social housing and poverty.

The borough has a higher proportion (16.6 percent) of high earners (over £60,000 per year) than any other local government district in the country. It has the highest proportion of workers in the financial sector and the lowest proportion working in the retail sector.

In December 2006 Sport England published a survey which showed that the borough's residents were the fourth most active in England in sports and other fitness activities. 27.9 percent of the population participate at least three times a week for 30 minutes.

A 2017 study by Trust for London and the New Policy Institute found that Kensington & Chelsea has the greatest income inequality of any London Borough. Private rent for low earners was also found to be the least affordable in London. However, the borough's poverty rate of 28% is roughly in line with the London-wide average.

=== Ethnicity ===
Ethnic Group	Year											
Ethnic Group	1971 estimations		1981 estimations		1991 census		2001 census		2011 census		2021 census	
Ethnic Group	Number	%	Number	%	Number	%	Number	%	Number	%	Number	%
White: Total	–	93.8%	127,634	88.8%	122,936	84.6%	124,924	78.61%	112,017	70.61%	91,394	63.8%
White: British	–	–	–	–	–	–	79,594	50.08%	62,271	39.25%	46,883	32.7%
White: Irish	–	–	–	–	–	–	5,183	3.26%	3,715	2.34%	2,825	2.0%
White: Gypsy or Irish Traveller	–	–	–	–	–	–	–	–	119	0.08%	84	0.1%
White: Roma	–	–	–	–	–	–	–	–	–	–	1,049	0.7%
White: Other	–	–	–	–	–	–	40,147	25.26%	45,912	28.94%	40,553	28.3%
Asian or Asian British: Total	–	–	5,918	4.1%	8,741	6%	10,329	6.50%	15,861	10.00%	17,025	11.8%
Asian or Asian British: Indian	–	–	1274		1,711		3,226	2.03%	2,577	1.62%	3,209	2.2%
Asian or Asian British: Pakistani	–	–	634		867		1,203	0.76%	911	0.57%	1,282	0.9%
Asian or Asian British: Bangladeshi	–	–	372		613		1,148	0.72%	836	0.53%	1,488	1.0%
Asian or Asian British: Chinese	–	–	1,108		1,517		2,592	1.63%	3,968	2.50%	3,839	2.7%
Asian or Asian British: Other Asian	–	–	2,530		4,033		2,160	1.36%	7,569	4.77%	7,207	5.0%
Black or Black British: Total	–	–	6,581	4.6%	8,259	5.7%	11,081	6.97%	10,333	6.51%	11,279	7.9%
Black or Black British: African	–	–	2,176		2,891		6,013	3.78%	5,536	3.49%	6,944	4.8%
Black or Black British: Caribbean	–	–	3,148		3,701		4,101	2.58%	3,257	2.05%	3,237	2.3%
Black or Black British: Other Black	–	–	1,257		1,667		967	0.61%	1,540	0.97%	1,098	0.8%
Mixed or British Mixed: Total	–	–	–	–	–	–	6,505	4.09%	8,986	5.66%	9,525	6.6%
Mixed: White and Black Caribbean	–	–	–	–	–	–	1,290	0.81%	1,695	1.07%	1,725	1.2%
Mixed: White and Black African	–	–	–	–	–	–	1,057	0.67%	1,148	0.72%	1,288	0.9%
Mixed: White and Asian	–	–	–	–	–	–	1,863	1.17%	3,021	1.90%	3,047	2.1%
Mixed: Other Mixed	–	–	–	–	–	–	2,295	1.44%	3,122	1.97%	3,465	2.4%
Other: Total	–	–	3,619	2.5%	5,364	3.7%	6,080	3.83%	11,452	7.22%	14,150	9.9%
Other: Arab	–	–	–	–	–	–	–	–	6,455	4.07%	6,384	4.5%
Other: Any other ethnic group	–	–	–	–	–	–	–	–	4,997	3.15%	7,766	5.4%
Ethnic minority: Total	–	6.2%	16,118	11.2%	22,364	15.4%	33,995	21.39%	46,632	29.39%	51,979	36.2%
Total	–	100%	143,752	100%	145,300	100%	158,919	100.00%	158,649	100.00%	143,373	100%

=== Religion ===
Religion in Royal Borough of Kensington and Chelsea (2018)
1. Christianity (48.4%)
2. Islam (11.8%)
3. Judaism (1.90%)
4. Hinduism (1.10%)
5. Buddhism (1.10%)
6. Any other religion (0.70%)
7. Non-religious (24.8%)

The following shows the religious identity of residents residing in Kensington and Chelsea according to the 2001, 2011 and the 2021 censuses.

Religion	2001		2011		2021	
Religion	Number	%	Number	%	Number	%
Holds religious beliefs	120,052	75.5	110,011	69.3	93,452	65.2
Christian	98,466	62.0	86,005	54.2	69,335	48.4
Muslim	13,364	8.4	15,812	10.0	16,865	11.8
Jewish	3,550	2.2	3,320	2.1	2,681	1.9
Hindu	1,594	1.0	1,386	0.9	1,584	1.1
Sikh	325	0.2	263	0.2	319	0.2
Buddhist	1,849	1.2	2,447	1.5	1,606	1.1
Other religion	904	0.6	778	0.5	1,064	0.7
No religion	24,240	15.3	32,669	20.6	35,610	24.8
Religion not stated	14,627	9.2	15,969	10.1	14,311	10.0
Total population	158,919	100.0	158,649	100.0	143,373	100.0

=== Places of worship ===
The borough has a number of notable churches, including:

- Brompton Oratory – Roman Catholic
- Chelsea Old Church (All Saints) – Church of England
- Holy Trinity Brompton – Church of England
- St Columba's Church, Pont Street – Church of Scotland
- St Luke's Church, Chelsea, Sydney Street – Church of England
- St Mary Abbots – Church of England
- St Sophia's Cathedral – Greek Orthodox Church
- Kensington Temple – Elim Pentecostal Church

It is home to a small Spanish and Portuguese synagogue, several mosques and the Sikh Central Gurudwara in Holland Park. There are two Armenian churches – Saint Sarkis Armenian Church and Church of Saint Yeghiche. Westminster Synagogue is also partially located in the borough.

=== Immigration ===
This list includes top-15 sources of immigration to Royal Borough of Kensington and Chelsea for 2021 census:

#	Country	Number
1	United States	5,806
2	Italy	5,518
3	France	5,272
4	Spain	2,992
5	Philippines	2,762
6	Germany	1,952
7	China	1,890
8	Iran	1,841
9	Russia	1,746
10	Ireland	1,745
11	India	1,698
12	Australia	1,684
13	Lebanon	1,492
14	Portugal	1,437
15	Morocco	1,348

== Transport ==
=== Underground ===
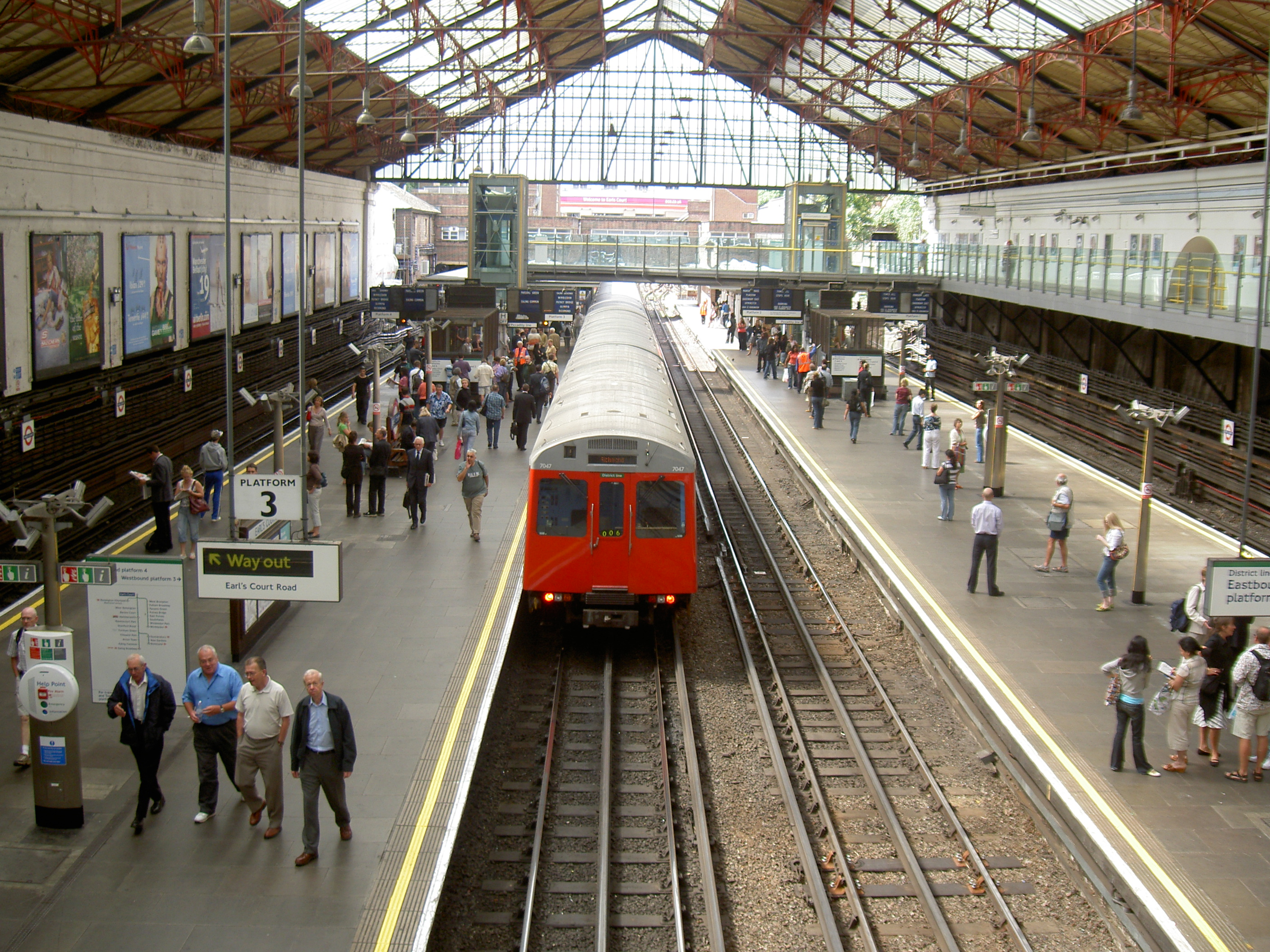
A London Underground train departing from Earl's Court station

The borough has 12 tube stations, on five of the 11 London Underground lines: the Central line, Circle line, District line, Hammersmith & City line and Piccadilly line. The borough contains the stations of South Kensington, Gloucester Road, High Street Kensington, Earl's Court, Sloane Square, West Brompton, Notting Hill Gate, Holland Park, Latimer Road, Knightsbridge, Westbourne Park and Ladbroke Grove.

==== Crossrail ====
Chelsea (SW3, SW10 and partly SW1) has significantly less Underground access than Kensington, the only station within Chelsea being Sloane Square. There have for some time been long-term plans for a Chelsea-Hackney line, with a station in the King's Road near Chelsea Town Hall, and possibly another at Sloane Square. As of June 2019, the plans for Crossrail 2 materialising show the proposed route tunnelling through Chelsea and featuring the planned King's Road Chelsea station on the site of Dovehouse Green. The future of this station, being the only fully new station on the proposed line, remains ambiguous; initial reports of the station idea having been scrapped seem to be contradicted by the station's placement on an official Transport for London map for the route.

A Crossrail station on the original Crossrail route, from Paddington to Reading, has been proposed and endorsed by the council. This station would be located near the northern end of Ladbroke Grove, and would serve the areas of North Kensington and Kensal. The council supports this station concept as it would renew infrastructure and build regeneration benefits in the area.

=== National Rail and Overground ===
Paddington and Victoria are the nearest major railway termini; National Rail stations in the borough are Kensington (Olympia) and West Brompton (and partly Kensal Green), both served by London Overground and Southern.

=== Buses ===
Many London bus routes pass through the borough, most of them along King's Road, Fulham Road, Kensington High Street and Ladbroke Grove.

=== Cycling ===
Kensington and Chelsea council has been criticised for its lack of support for cycle lanes and active travel in general. In 2019 the council vetoed a flagship programme by Transport for London for safer walking and cycling in the borough. In 2020 it scrapped a cycle lane along Kensington High Street just seven weeks after it was installed.

=== Travel to work ===
In March 2011 the main forms of transport that residents used to travel to work were: underground, metro, light rail, tram, 23.6 percent of all residents aged 16–74; driving a car or van, 8.2 percent; on foot, 8.2 percent; bus, minibus or coach, 8.0 percent; work mainly at or from home, 7.0 percent; bicycle, 3.1 percent; train, 2.1 percent.

== Social housing and Grenfell tower fire ==
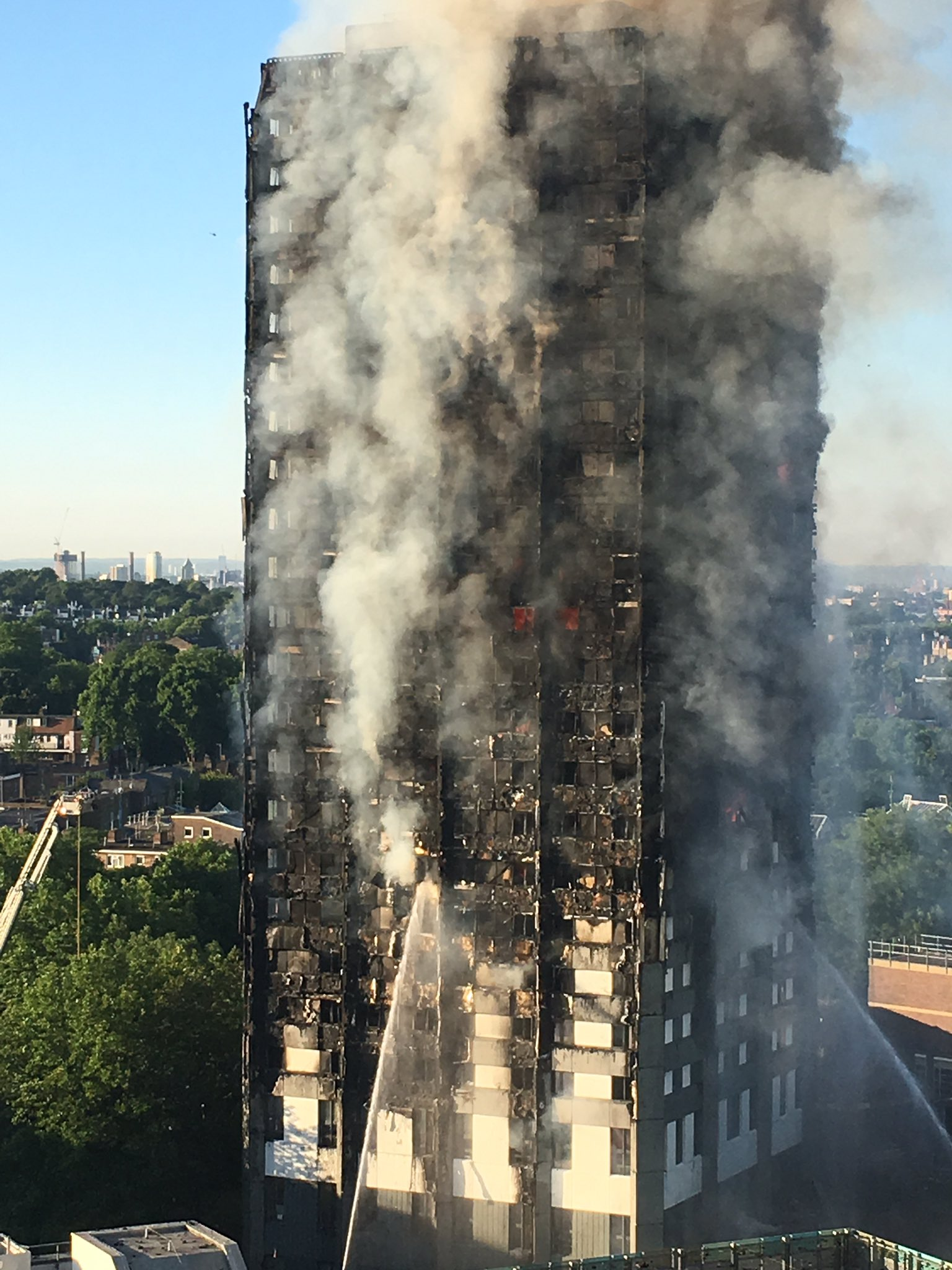
Grenfell Tower in the early morning of 14 June 2017.

The RBKC is a major provider of social housing in the borough owning 9,459 properties. Of these over 73 percent are tenanted, with the remainder being leasehold. The management of this housing was devolved to the Kensington and Chelsea TMO (KCTMO), a tenant management organisation. Properties included Trellick Tower.

The 2017 Grenfell Tower fire, in which one public-housing tower of the estate Grenfell Tower was completely destroyed and 72 lives were lost, drew international attention to the borough. After widespread criticism of the borough council's response to the fire, responsibility for providing services to those affected by the fire was taken away from RBKC. Prime Minister Theresa May previously branded the response to the tragedy "not good enough", with Whitehall civil servants drafted in as part of a beefed-up operation in the local area. Anna Stec who gave evidence as an expert witness to the Grenfell Tower Inquiry has urged the authorities to test rescue workers, nearby residents and survivors for carcinogenic chemicals following the fire.

The Grenfell Tower Inquiry criticised the borough for its lack of oversight of the Tenant Management Organisation responsible for the day to day management of the tower and the failure of the borough's building control to carry out its statutory duty to ensure the refurbishment of the tower met building regulations. On September 30 2026, the Metropolitan Police referred the borough to the Crown Prosecution Service for Corporate Manslaughter, acting contrary to the Regulatory Reform (fire safety) Order 2005, and breaching section 3 of the Health and Safety at Work Act 1974.

== Featured places ==
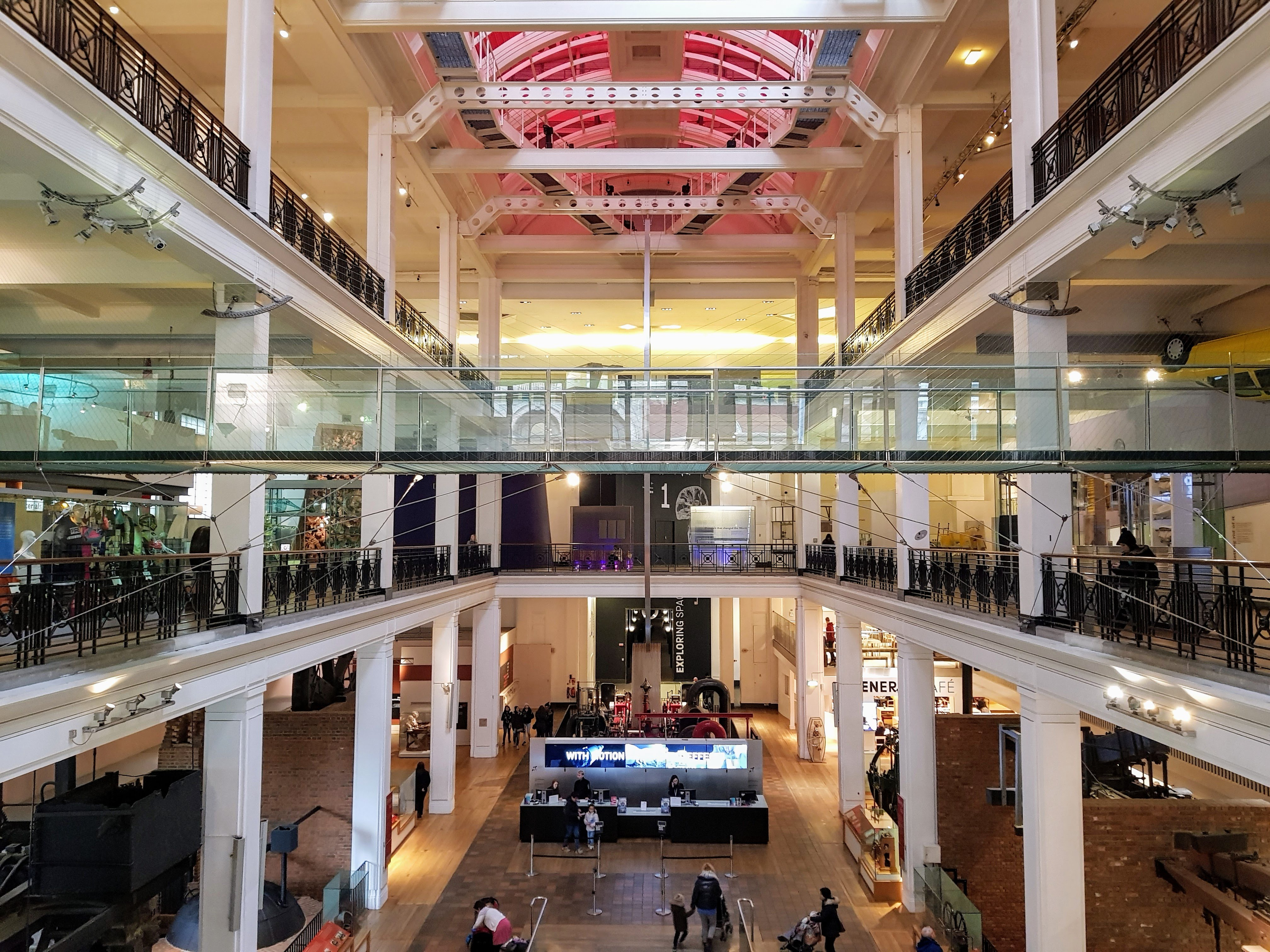
The Science Museum

Within the borough there are several of London's tourist attractions and landmarks:

- Brompton Oratory
- Earl's Court
- Harrods
- Hill House School
- Imperial College London
- Jumeirah Carlton Tower
- Kensington Arcade
- Kensington High Street
- Kensington Palace
- King's Road
- Ladbroke Grove
- Leighton House Museum
- Notting Hill Gate
- Olympia (part)
- Portobello Road
- Royal Hospital Chelsea
- Saatchi Gallery
- Sloane Street
- The Science Museum and Natural History Museum
- Victoria & Albert Museum

== Education ==
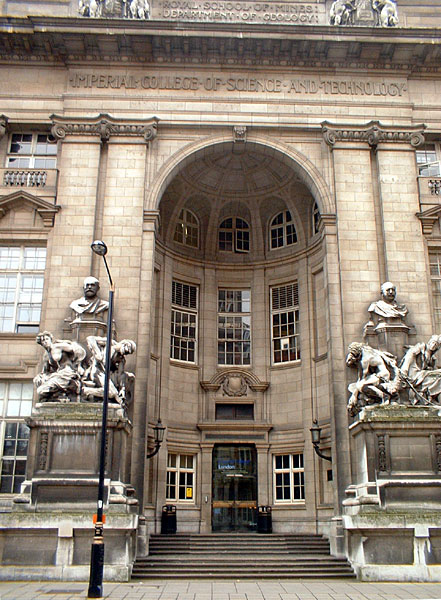
Main entrance of the Royal School of Mines, Imperial College London

=== Schools ===
The council's education department finances state schools.

London's Poverty Profile - a 2017 study by Trust for London and the New Policy Institute - found that 75% of 19-year-olds in Kensington and Chelsea have at least a C in their GCSE English and Maths. This is the highest success rate in London.

=== Independent preparatory schools ===
- Hill House School, whose notable alumni including King Charles III and actress Anya Taylor-Joy.
- Sussex House School

=== Further education ===
- Kensington and Chelsea College
- St Charles Catholic Sixth Form College

=== Universities ===
- English National Ballet School
- Royal College of Art
- Royal College of Music
- Imperial College London
- Heythrop College
- Richmond, The American International University in London
- Fordham University

=== Public libraries ===
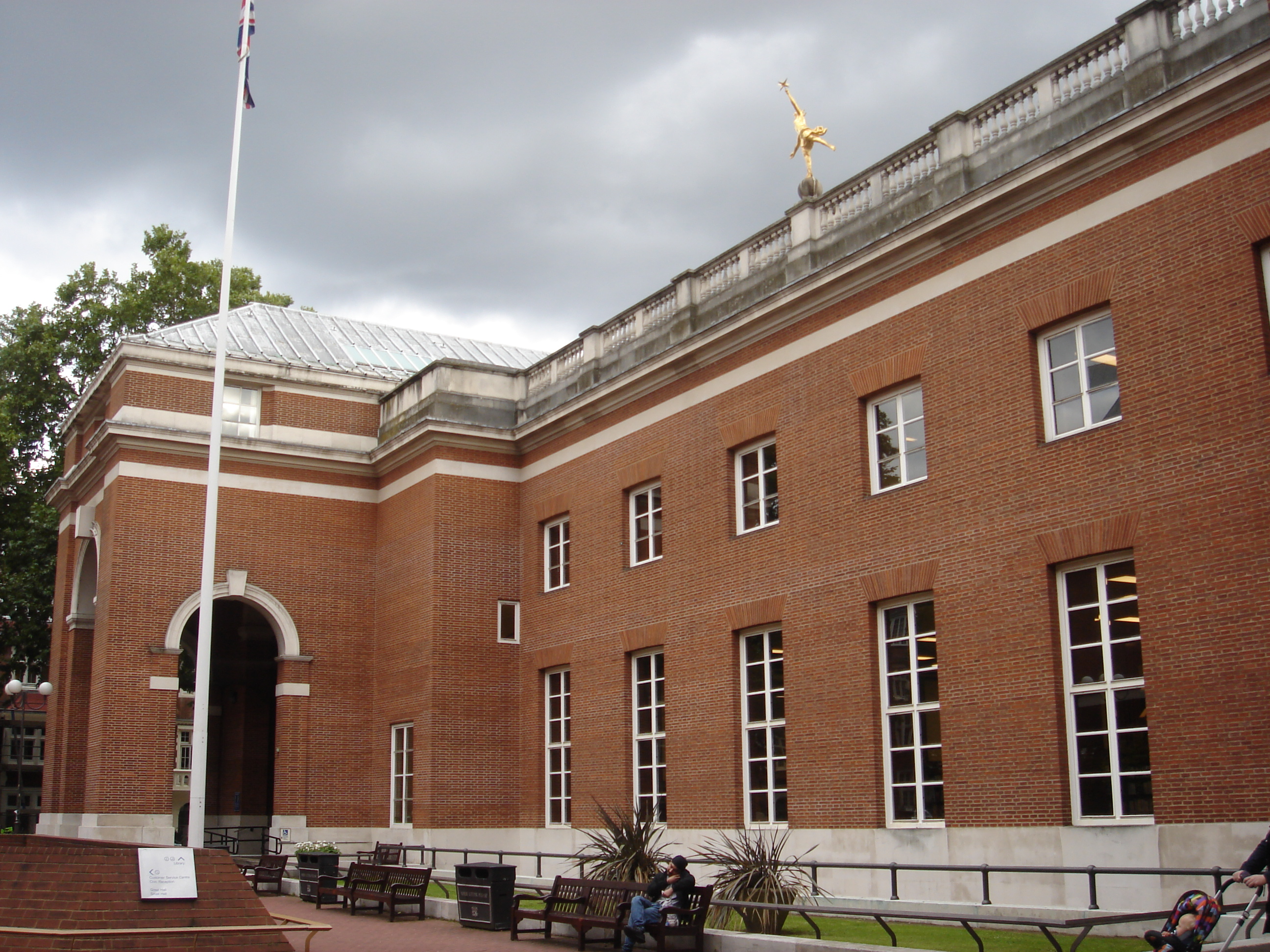
Kensington Central Library, London W8

Libraries include the Kensington Central Library, Chelsea Library, Kensal Library, Brompton Library, North Kensington Library and the Notting Hill Gate Library.

== International relations ==
=== Town twinning ===
The Royal Borough of Kensington and Chelsea is formally twinned with:

- Cannes, Alpes-Maritimes, Provence-Alpes-Côte d'Azur, France

== Freedom of the Borough ==
The following people and military units have received the Freedom of Royal Borough of Kensington and Chelsea.

=== Individuals ===
- Sir Winston Churchill: 1949. (Borough of Kensington)

=== Military units ===
- The Army Phantom Signal Regiment: 6 October 1959. (Borough of Kensington)
- The Royal Hospital Chelsea: 28 June 2006.
- 31 (City of London) Signal Regiment (V)
- Kensington Regiment (Princess Louise's) Signal Squadron 38 Signal Regiment
- D Company (London Irish Rifles) The London Regiment
- 10 Company 4th Battalion, Parachute Regiment
- 21 Special Air Services Regiment (Artists Rifles) (V)
- 256 (City of London) Field Hospital (V)
- The Royal Yeomanry
- The University of London Air Squadron (V)
- University of London Royal Naval Unit

== See also ==
- Tri-borough shared services
