= List of diplomatic missions in the United Kingdom =

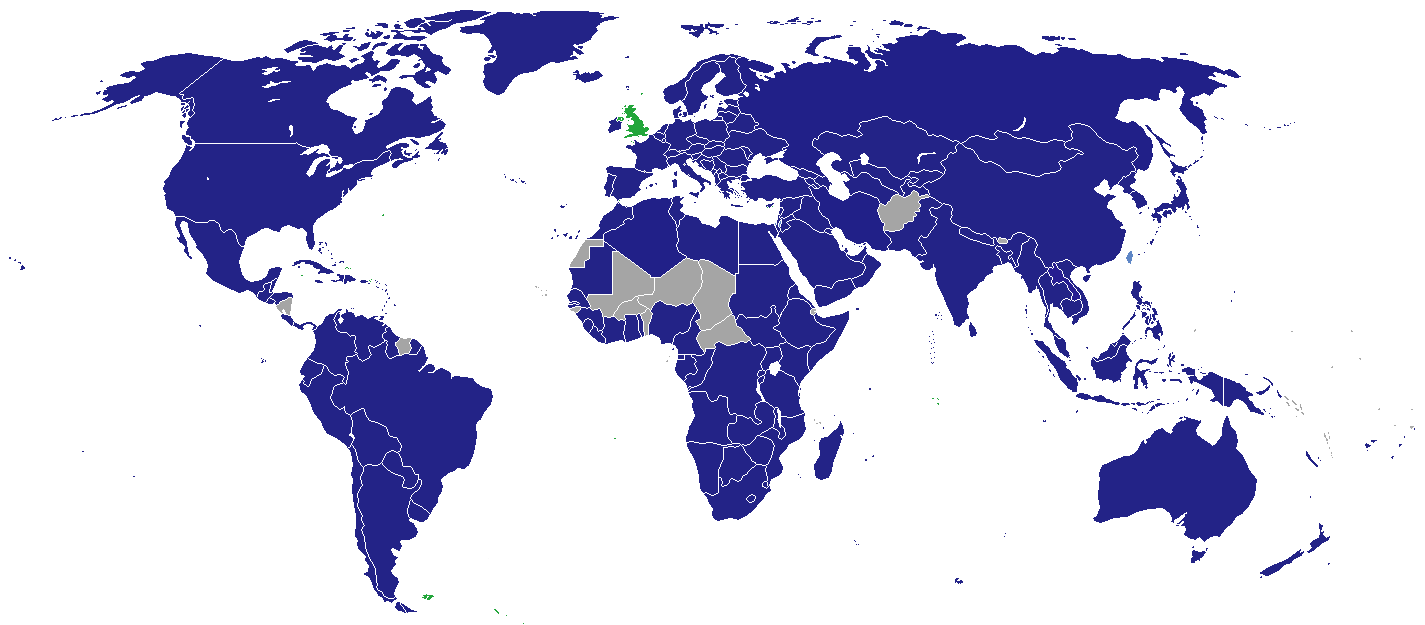
Map of diplomatic missions in the United Kingdom

This is a list of diplomatic missions in the United Kingdom. At present, the capital city of London hosts 168 embassies and high commissions. Several other countries have ambassadors accredited to the United Kingdom, with most being resident in Brussels or Paris. There are also a number of Honorary Consuls resident in various locations in the UK.

== Embassies and high commissions in London ==
The following 168 countries maintain embassies and high commissions in London as their primary diplomatic missions to the United Kingdom.

1. Albania
2. Algeria
3. Angola
4. Antigua and Barbuda
5. Argentina
6. Armenia
7. Australia
8. Austria
9. Azerbaijan
10. Bahamas
11. Bahrain
12. Bangladesh
13. Barbados
14. Belarus
15. Belgium
16. Belize
17. Bolivia
18. Bosnia and Herzegovina
19. Botswana
20. Brazil
21. Brunei
22. Bulgaria
23. Burundi
24. Cambodia
25. Cameroon
26. Canada
27. Chile
28. China
29. Colombia
30. Congo-Brazzaville
31. Congo-Kinshasa
32. Costa Rica
33. Croatia
34. Cuba
35. Cyprus
36. Czech Republic
37. Denmark
38. Dominica
39. Dominican Republic
40. Ecuador
41. Egypt
42. El Salvador
43. Equatorial Guinea
44. Eritrea
45. Estonia
46. Eswatini
47. Ethiopia
48. Fiji
49. Finland
50. France
51. Gabon
52. Gambia
53. Georgia
54. Germany
55. Ghana
56. Greece
57. Grenada
58. Guatemala
59. Guinea
60. Guyana
61. Haiti
62. Holy See
63. Honduras
64. Hungary
65. Iceland
66. India
67. Indonesia
68. Iran
69. Iraq
70. Ireland
71. Israel
72. Italy
73. Ivory Coast
74. Jamaica
75. Japan
76. Jordan
77. Kazakhstan
78. Kenya
79. Kosovo
80. Kuwait
81. Kyrgyzstan
82. Laos
83. Latvia
84. Lebanon
85. Lesotho
86. Liberia
87. Libya
88. Lithuania
89. Luxembourg
90. Madagascar
91. Malawi
92. Malaysia
93. Maldives
94. Malta
95. Mauritania
96. Mauritius
97. Mexico
98. Moldova
99. Monaco
100. Mongolia
101. Montenegro
102. Morocco
103. Mozambique
104. Myanmar
105. Namibia
106. Nepal
107. Netherlands
108. New Zealand
109. Nigeria
110. North Korea
111. North Macedonia
112. Norway
113. Oman
114. Pakistan
115. Palestine
116. Panama
117. Papua New Guinea
118. Paraguay
119. Peru
120. Philippines
121. Poland
122. Portugal
123. Qatar
124. Romania
125. Russia
126. Rwanda
127. Saint Kitts and Nevis
128. Saint Lucia
129. Saint Vincent and the Grenadines
130. Saudi Arabia
131. Senegal
132. Serbia
133. Seychelles
134. Sierra Leone
135. Singapore
136. Slovakia
137. Slovenia
138. Somalia
139. South Africa
140. South Korea
141. South Sudan
142. Spain
143. Sri Lanka
144. Sudan
145. Sweden
146. Switzerland
147. Syria
148. Tajikistan
149. Tanzania
150. Thailand
151. Timor-Leste
152. Togo
153. Tonga
154. Trinidad and Tobago
155. Tunisia
156. Turkey
157. Turkmenistan
158. Uganda
159. Ukraine
160. United Arab Emirates
161. United States
162. Uruguay
163. Uzbekistan
164. Venezuela
165. Vietnam
166. Yemen
167. Zambia
168. Zimbabwe

== Other missions in London ==
=== Representative offices of British Overseas Territories ===
The following British Overseas Territories maintain representative offices in London.

- Anguilla (Representative Office)
- Bermuda (Representative Office)
- British Virgin Islands
- Cayman Islands
- Falkland Islands (Representative Office)
- Gibraltar (Representative Office)
- Montserrat (Representative Office)
- Saint Helena, Ascension and Tristan da Cunha
- Turks and Caicos Islands

=== Other regions ===
The following regions have diplomatic missions in London.

- Catalonia (Spain) - Delegation
- Flanders (Belgium) - Delegation
- French Community of Belgium - General Delegation
- Hong Kong (China) - Economic and Trade Office
- Quebec (Canada) - Delegation

=== Countries with limited recognition ===
The following disputed states have diplomatic missions in London.

- Northern Cyprus (Representative Office)
- Somaliland (Mission)
- Republic of China (Representative Office)

=== International organisations ===
- Arab League (Office)
- European Union (Delegation)
- United Nations:
  - International Maritime Organization
  - United Nations High Commissioner for Refugees and World Food Programme (Office)
- World Bank (Office)

== Consular missions ==
Some countries also maintain career consular missions in the following towns and cities, under a variety of names. All are consulates-general unless otherwise indicated.

=== Belfast, Northern Ireland ===
1. China
2. India
3. Poland
4. Timor-Leste
5. United States

=== Birmingham, England ===
1. Bangladesh (Assistant High Commission)
2. India
3. Pakistan (Consulate)
4. Romania

=== Bradford, England ===
1. Pakistan (Consulate)

=== Cardiff, Wales ===
1. Ireland

=== Comber, Northern Ireland ===
1. Saint Vincent and the Grenadines

=== Edinburgh, Scotland ===
1. Brazil
2. Bulgaria (Consulate)
3. China
4. France
5. Germany
6. Hungary
7. India
8. Ireland
9. Italy
10. Japan
11. Poland
12. Romania
13. Russia
14. Spain
15. Taiwan (Office)
16. Turkey
17. Ukraine (Consulate)
18. United States

=== George Town, Cayman Islands ===
- United States (Consular Agency)

=== Glasgow, Scotland ===
1. Iraq
2. Pakistan (Consulate)

=== Hamilton, Bermuda ===
1. United States

=== Manchester, England ===
1. Bangladesh (Assistant High Commission)
2. China(article)
3. Czech Republic
4. Greece
5. Hungary
6. India
7. Iraq
8. Ireland
9. Italy (Consulate)
10. Libya
11. Pakistan
12. Poland
13. Portugal
14. Romania
15. Spain
16. Turkey

== Accredited non-resident embassies ==
Resident in Brussels, Belgium:

- Burkina Faso†
- Cape Verde†
- Mali
- Samoa†
- São Tomé and Príncipe†
- Vanuatu†

Resident in Paris, France:

- Benin†
- Central African Republic
- Chad
- Djibouti
- Guinea-Bissau
- Niger

Resident in other locations

- Andorra (Andorra la Vella)
- Kiribati (Tarawa)†
- San Marino (San Marino)†
- Suriname (The Hague)†
- Tuvalu (Abu Dhabi)†

† States which, in addition to a non-resident diplomatic mission, have a resident honorary consul.

== States represented only by honorary consuls ==
- Bhutan
- Comoros
- Liechtenstein
- Nauru
- Palau
- Tuvalu (Tuvalu House)

== States with no representation in the United Kingdom ==
The following sovereign states have no form of representation in the United Kingdom:

- Marshall Islands
- Federated States of Micronesia

There are also a number of partially recognised states not recognised by the United Kingdom; see List of states with limited recognition.

== Closed missions ==
Host city	Sending country	Mission	Year closed	Ref.
London	Afghanistan	Embassy	2024	
London	Burkina Faso	Embassy (Note: Resident in Brussels, Belgium)	1967	
London	Nicaragua	Embassy	2024	
London	Solomon Islands	High Commission	2023	
London	Sweden	Consulate-General (Note: Upgraded to Embassy of Sweden.)	1973	
London	Republic of China	Embassy	1950	
Bedford	Italy	Vice-consulate	2008	
Belfast	Ireland	Consulate-General	2012	
Birmingham	United States	Consulate	1965	
Bradford	United States	Consulate	1953	
Bristol	United States	Consulate	1948	
Cardiff	United States	Consulate	1963	
Edinburgh	Norway	Consulate-General	2008	
Edinburgh	Switzerland	Consulate-General	2011	
Gibraltar	Spanish State	Consulate-General	1954	
Glasgow	Polish People's Republic	Consulate-General	1985	
Glasgow	United States	Consulate	1965	
Kingston upon Hull	United States	Consulate	1948	
Liverpool	Colombia	Consulate-General	1988	
Liverpool	France	Consulate-General	1991	
Liverpool	United States	Consulate	1973	
Manchester	Australia	Consulate	2001	
Manchester	Iran	Consulate	1987	
Manchester	United States	Consulate	1963	
Newcastle-on-Tyne	United States	Consulate	1953	
Plymouth	United States	Consulate	1948	
Southampton	Poland	Consular agency	Unknown	
Southampton	United States	Consulate	1965	

== See also ==
- Foreign relations of the United Kingdom
- List of diplomatic missions in Scotland
- List of diplomatic missions in Northern Ireland
- List of diplomatic missions of the United Kingdom
- List of ambassadors and high commissioners to the United Kingdom
- List of country codes on British diplomatic vehicle registration plates
- Visa requirements for British citizens
