= Ladbroke Grove railway station =

Proposed railway station in London, England

Ladbroke Grove
- Interactive map of Ladbroke Grove

General information
- Location: Kensal Green
- Local authority: Royal Borough of Kensington and Chelsea
- Managed by: Crossrail
- Owner: Network Rail Transport for London
- Number of platforms: 2

Other information
- Coordinates: 51.52618°N 0.22250°W

Ladbroke Grove is a proposed railway station in London, England on the Crossrail Route between Old Oak Common and Paddington. This is not part of the internal route and would be added at a later stage. Locals want the station to be called Portobello Central to serve the nearby Portobello Market. It was originally called Kensal.

== Proposals ==
Kensington and Chelsea Council has been pushing for a station at North Kensington / Kensal, just to the east of the Old Oak Common railway station site, off Ladbroke Grove and Canal Way, as a turn-back facility will have to be built in the area anyway. Siting it at Kensal Rise, rather than next to Paddington itself, would provide a new station to regenerate the area. Amongst the general public there is a huge amount of support for the project and then-mayor of London Boris Johnson stated that a station would be added if it did not increase Crossrail's overall cost; in response, Kensington and Chelsea Council agreed to underwrite the projected £33 million cost of a Crossrail station, which was received very well by the residents of the borough. Transport for London (TfL) is conducting a feasibility study on the station and the project is backed by National Grid, retailers Sainsbury's and Cath Kidston, and Jenny Jones (Green Party member of the London Assembly).

The plans were resurrected by Boris Johnson in 2016.

In March 2017, it was announced that TfL was considering a Crossrail station in Kensal Green, on the site of a former gasworks, and it would be between Old Oak Common and Paddington.

== Services ==
Proposed services
Preceding station	Elizabeth line	Following station
Old Oak Common towards Reading or Heathrow Airport Terminal 4 or Terminal 5	Elizabeth line	Paddington towards Abbey Wood or Shenfield
