= List of consular missions in Scotland =

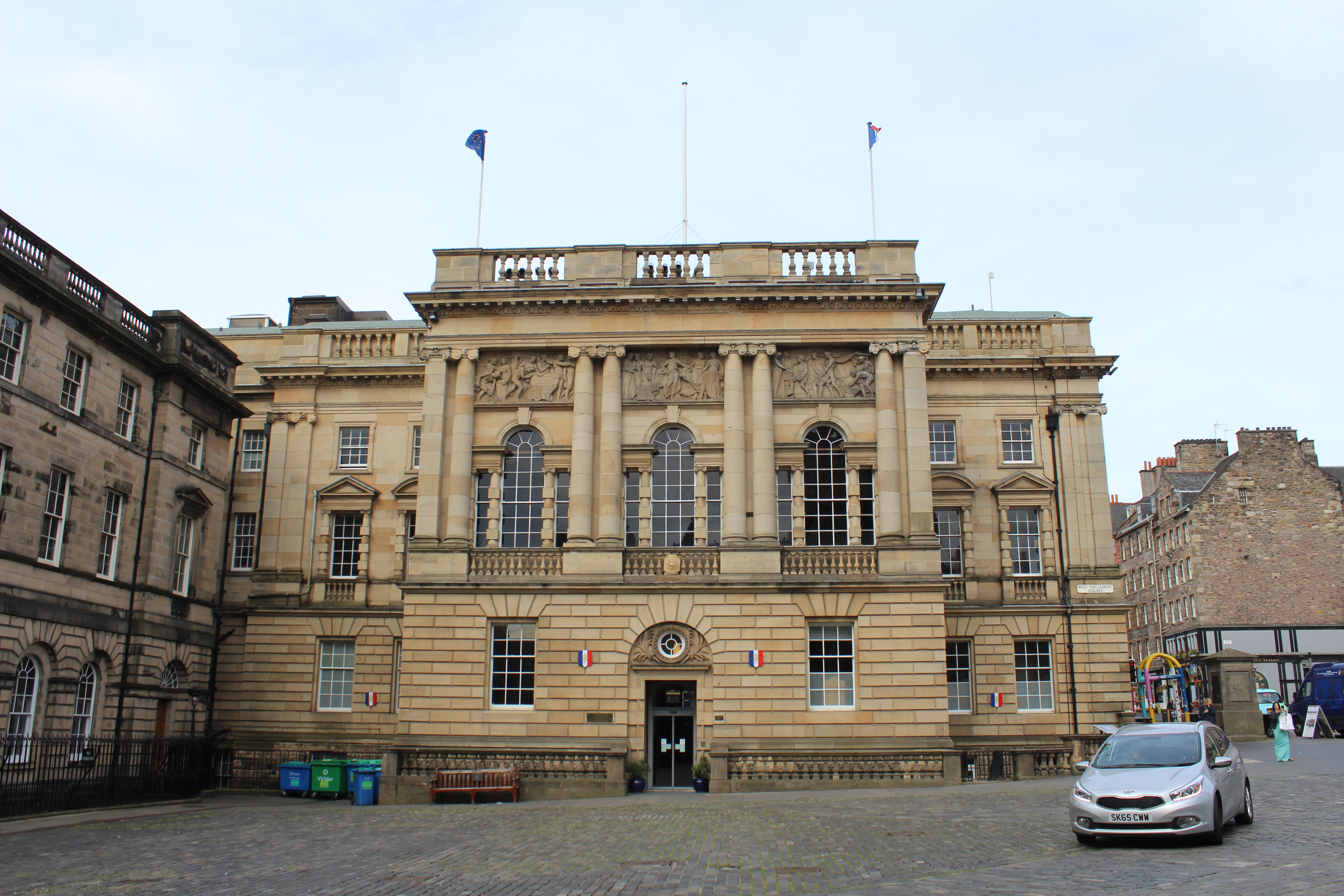
Consulate-General of France in Edinburgh

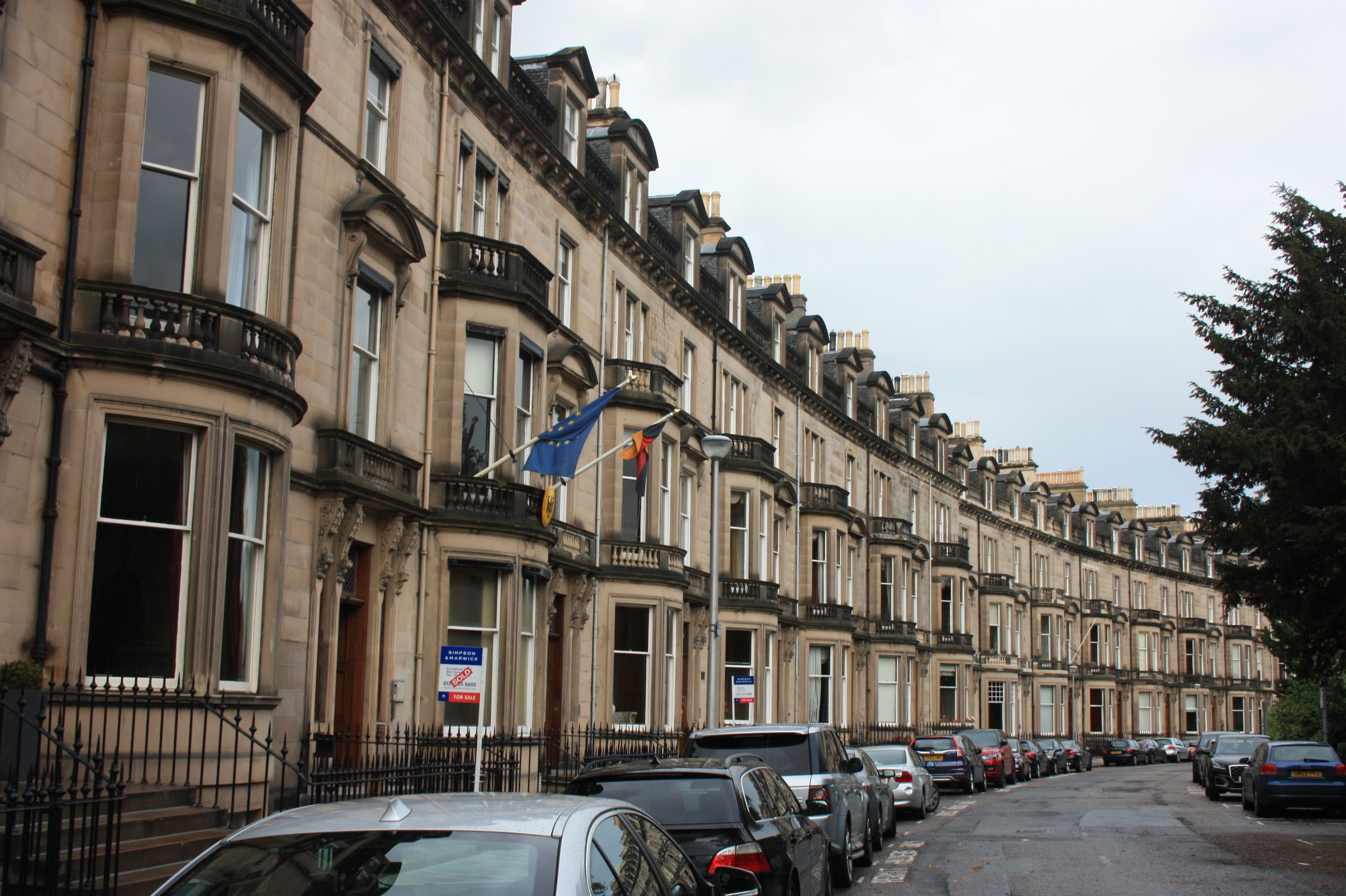
Consulate-General of Germany in Edinburgh

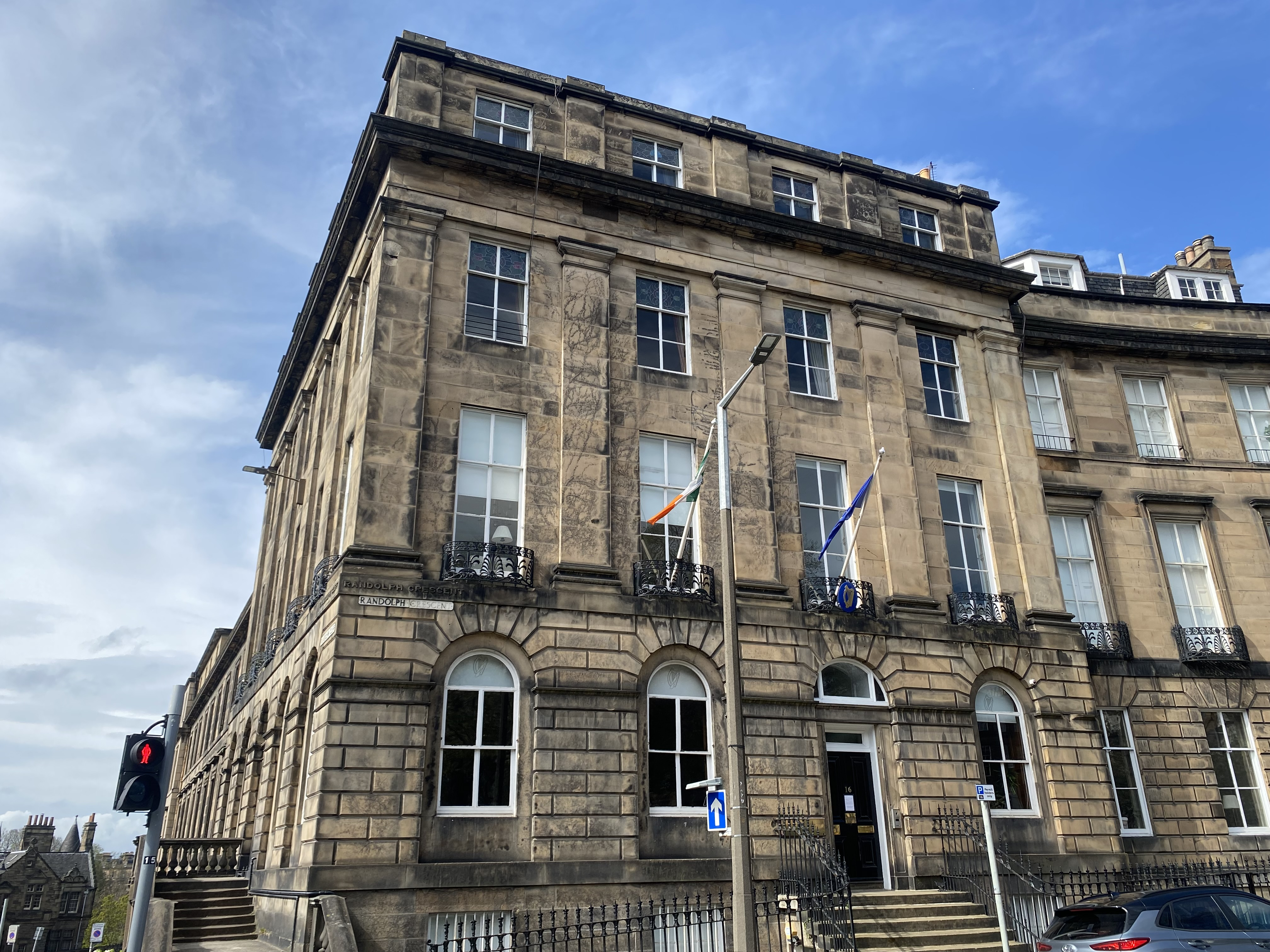
Consulate-General of Ireland in Edinburgh

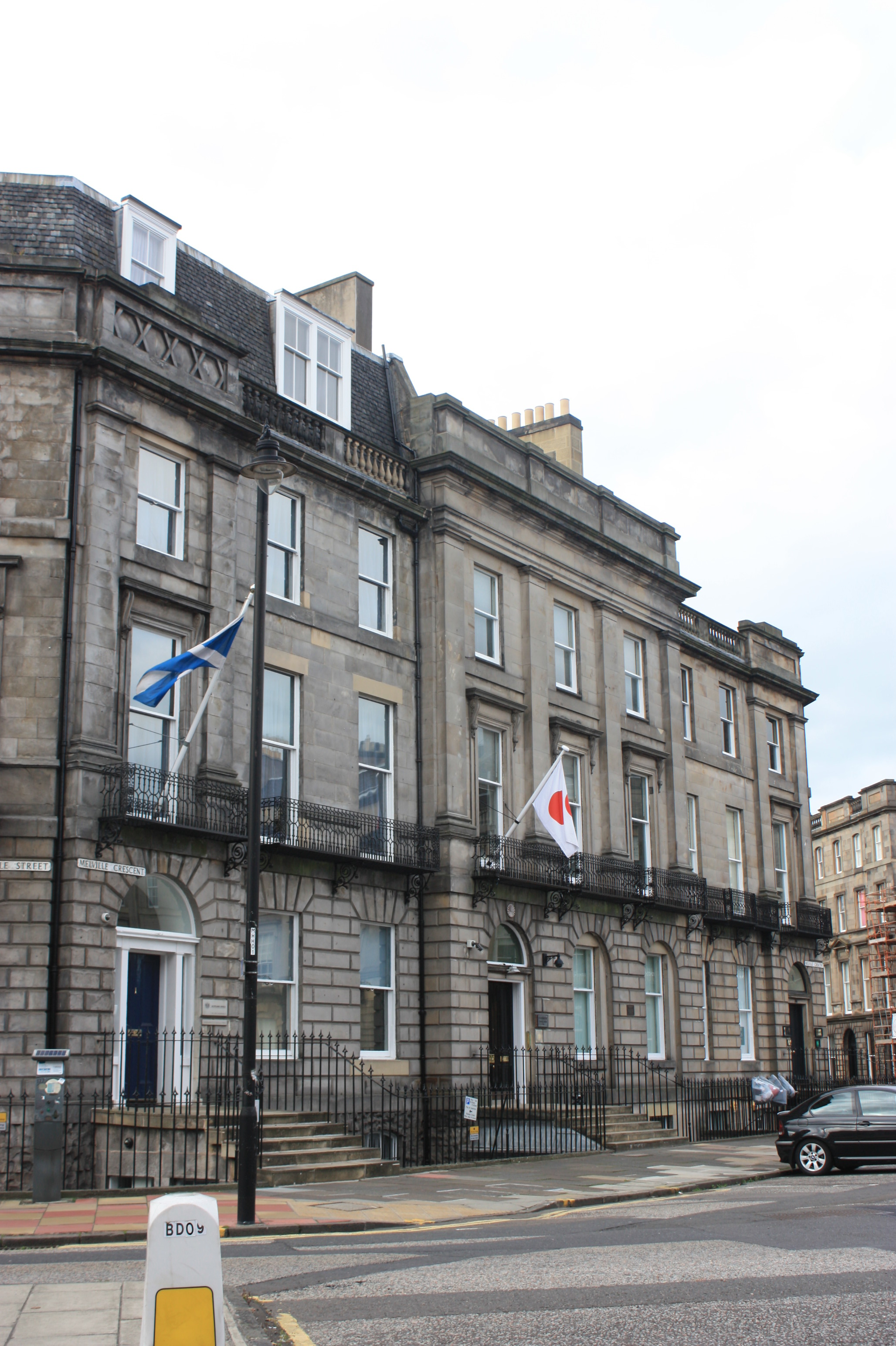
Consulate-General of Japan in Edinburgh

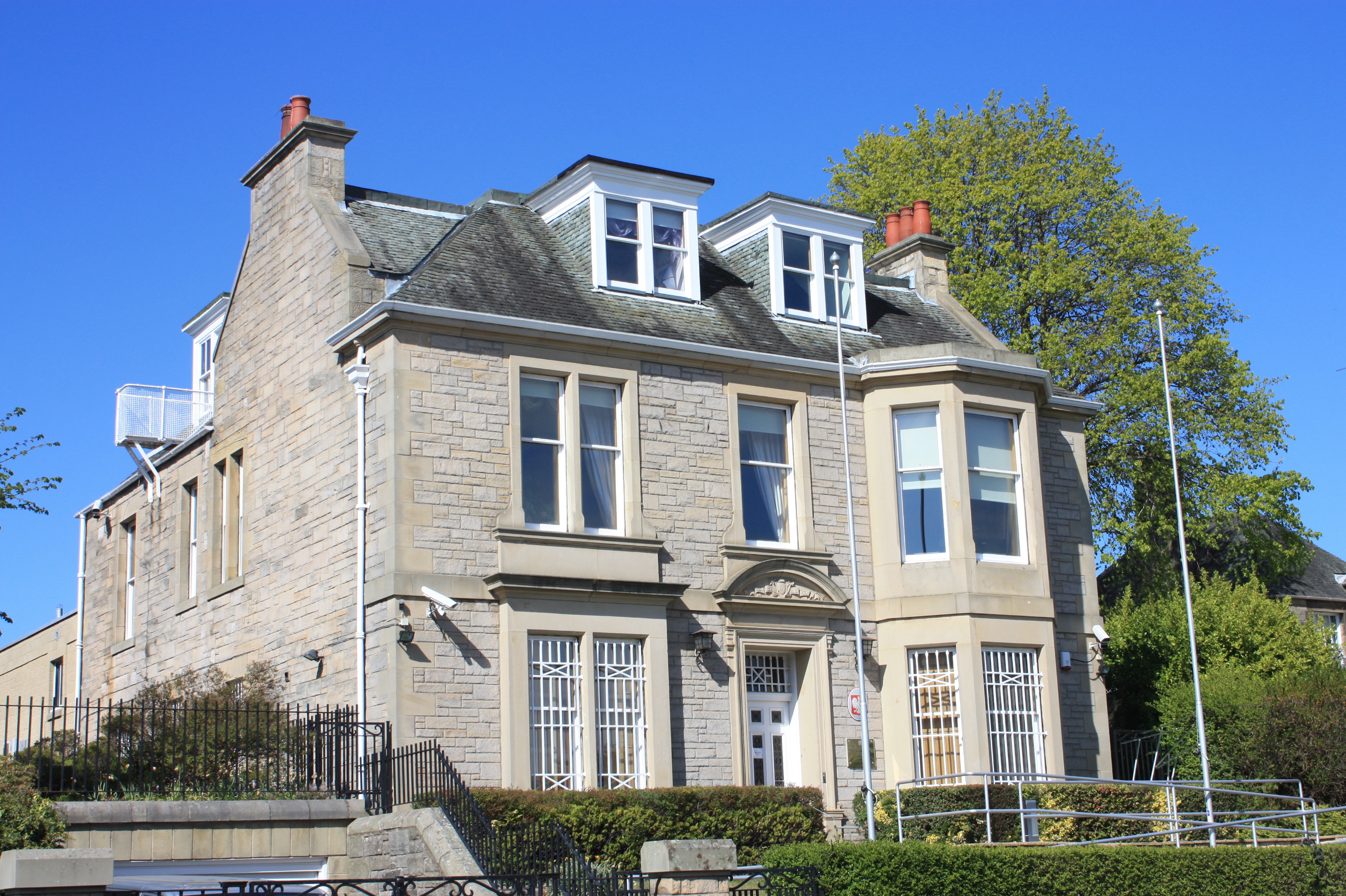
Consulate-General of Poland in Edinburgh

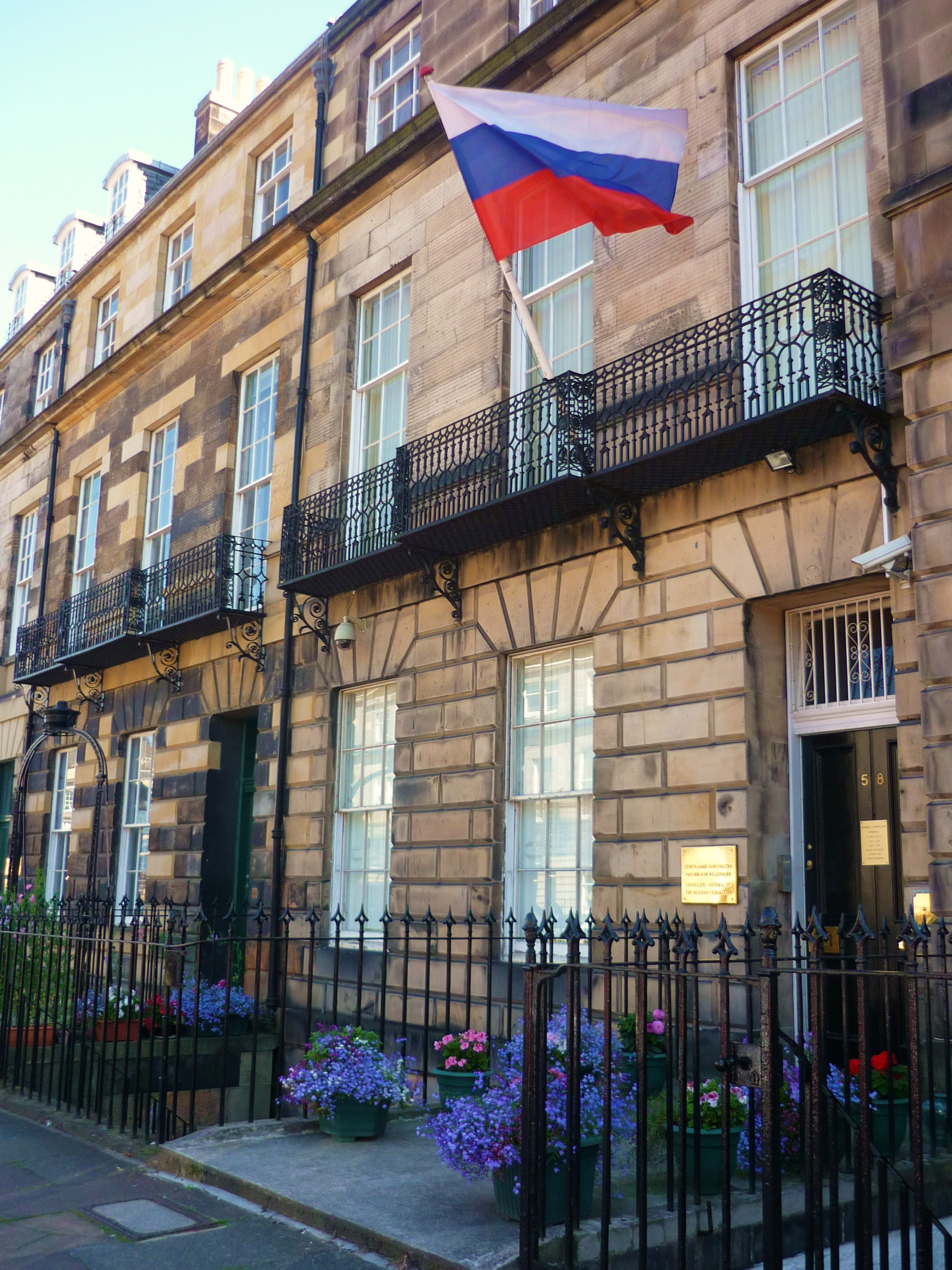
Consulate-General of Russia in Edinburgh

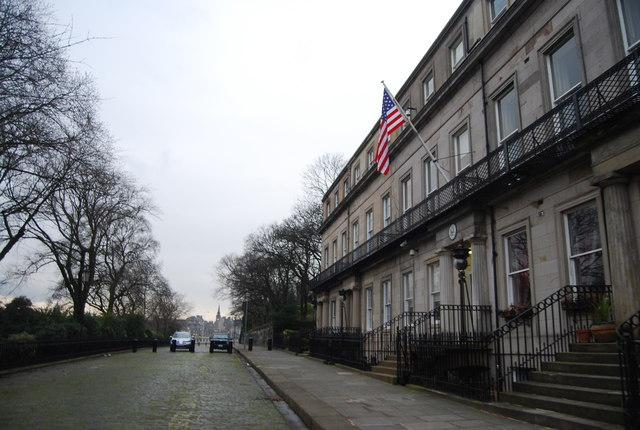
Consulate-General of the United States in Edinburgh

This page lists the consular missions located in Scotland. These consular posts are listed by the FCDO, which is responsible for issuing documents of identification to consular staff; the FCDO lists were last updated in November 2023.

== Consulates General and Consulates ==
=== Edinburgh ===
- Brazil Consulate-General
- China Consulate General
- France Consulate General
- Germany Consulate General
- India Consulate General
- Ireland Consulate General
- Italy Consulate General
- Japan Consulate General
- Poland Consulate General
- Romania Consulate General
- Russia Consulate General
- Spain Consulate General
- Turkey Consulate General
- Ukraine Consulate
- United States Consulate General

=== Glasgow ===
- Pakistan Consulate General

== Honorary consuls ==
=== Aberdeen ===
- Ivory Coast
- Denmark Honorary Vice-Consulate
- Estonia Honorary Consulate
- France Honorary Consulate
- Germany Honorary Consulate
- Iceland Honorary Consulate
- Italy Honorary Consulate
- Netherlands Honorary Consulate
- Norway Honorary Consulate
- Romania Honorary Consulate
- Spain Honorary Consulate

=== Cupar ===
- Croatia Honorary Consulate

=== Dundee ===
- Denmark Honorary Vice-Consulate
- Norway Honorary Consulate

=== Dunblane ===
- Cyprus Honorary Vice-Consulate

=== Edinburgh ===
- Austria Honorary Consulate
- Belgium Honorary Consulate
- Brazil Honorary Consulate
- Canada Honorary Consulate
- Czech Republic Honorary Consulate
- Denmark Honorary Consulate
- Estonia Honorary Consulate
- Finland Honorary Consulate
- France Honorary Consulate
- Greece Honorary Consulate General
- Iceland Honorary Consulate
- Jamaica Honorary Consulate
- South Korea Honorary Consulate
- Lithuania Honorary Consulate
- Luxembourg Honorary Consulate
- Latvia Honorary Consulate
- Monaco Honorary Consulate
- Malawi Honorary Consulate
- Mauritius Honorary Consulate
- Namibia Honorary Consulate
- Netherlands Honorary Consulate
- New Zealand Honorary Consulate
- Norway Honorary Consulate
- Portugal Honorary Consulate
- Sweden Honorary Consulate
- Sri Lanka Honorary Consulate
- Switzerland Honorary Consulate General

=== Glasgow ===
- Brazil Honorary Consulate
- Chile Honorary Consulate
- Cyprus Honorary Consulate
- Denmark Honorary Consulate
- Germany Honorary Consulate
- Greece Honorary Consulate
- Iceland Honorary Consulate
- Italy Honorary Consulate
- Latvia Honorary Consulate
- Mexico Honorary Consulate
- Mongolia Honorary Consulate
- Norway Honorary Consulate
- Romania Honorary Consulate
- Rwanda Honorary Consulate
- Slovakia Honorary Consulate
- Spain Honorary Consulate
- Sweden Honorary Consulate
- Thailand Honorary Consulate

=== Inverness ===
- Romania Honorary Consulate

=== Kirkwall ===
- Norway Honorary Consulate

=== Lerwick ===
- France Honorary Consulate
- Germany Honorary Consulate
- Sweden Honorary Consulate

=== Stirlingshire ===
- Malta Honorary Consulate

=== Stornoway ===
- Denmark Honorary Vice-Consulate
- France Honorary Consulate

== Other Missions ==
=== Edinburgh ===
- Taiwan (Representative office)

== See also ==
- Foreign relations of the United Kingdom
- List of diplomatic missions in the United Kingdom
- List of diplomatic missions of the United Kingdom
