= List of diplomatic missions in Northern Ireland =

This page lists diplomatic missions located in Northern Ireland, a constituent country within the United Kingdom.

== Consulates General ==
In Belfast

- China
- India
- Poland
- Timor-Leste
- United States

In Comber

- Saint Vincent and the Grenadines

== Honorary consulates ==
All in Belfast unless otherwise noted.

- Australia
- Belgium
- Brazil (Antrim)
- Bulgaria
- Canada (Killinchy)
- Chile (Rostrevor)
- Cyprus (Comber)
- Czech Republic
- Denmark
- El Salvador
- Estonia
- Finland (Newtownabbey)
- Germany (Derry)
- Greece
- Guatemala (Whiteabbey)
- Hungary (Coleraine)
- Iceland
- Italy
- Malawi (Hillsborough)
- Malta
- Mauritius
- Mexico
- Monaco (Bangor)
- Namibia (Newry)
- Netherlands (Hillsborough)
- New Zealand
- Norway
- Poland (Warrenpoint)
- Portugal (Portadown)
- Seychelles (Dungannon)
- Spain
- Sweden
- Eswatini
- Turkey
- Ukraine (Derry)

== Other diplomatic missions ==
Non-consular Department of Foreign Affairs missions to represent the Republic of Ireland in the Good Friday Agreement institutions:

- British Irish Inter-Governmental Secretariat (in Belfast)
- North-South Ministerial Council Joint Secretariat (in Armagh)

== Closed missions ==
Belfast

- European Union: The European Commission Office in Northern Ireland which was located in Belfast closed on 31 January 2020 when the United Kingdom left the EU. The European External Action Service, which operates the EU's foreign diplomatic missions, has proposed opening a delegation office in Belfast, however it is reportedly not approved by the British government in London.

== See also ==
- Foreign relations of the United Kingdom
- List of diplomatic missions of the United Kingdom
- Northern Ireland Executive representation offices abroad
- Office of the Northern Ireland Executive in Brussels
- Apostolic Nunciature to Ireland – The diplomatic mission of the Holy See in Dublin is accredited to the Republic of Ireland for political purposes, but also has ecclesiastical jurisdiction over All-Ireland
