= List of country codes on British diplomatic vehicle registration plates =

This is a list of country codes on UK-issued diplomatic vehicle registration plates, i.e. the first group of three numbers.

== Scheme design ==
Since 1979, motor vehicles operated by foreign embassies, high commissions, consulates and international organisations have been issued unique vehicle registration marks with a distinguishing format of three numbers, space, letter D or X, space and three numbers. The letter D is used for diplomats and X for non-diplomatic accredited personnel.

The first group of three numbers identifies the country or international organisation. The second group of three numbers is a serial number sequence starting at 101 for diplomats, 400 for non-diplomatic staff of international organisations, and 700 upwards for consular or other non-diplomatic staff. A special typeface was used for the numbers from 1990 until 2001, when the Mandatory typeface was introduced.

Eligible officials are required to be accredited by the Foreign, Commonwealth and Development Office (FCDO) who liaise with Specialist Registrations at the Driver & Vehicle Licensing Agency (DVLA) for issuance. Guidance document INF267 (4/18) has been produced by the DVLA for accredited officials.

Honorary consuls are not entitled under UK law to diplomatic vehicle registrations and/or driving permits.

Many foreign embassies and high commissions have acquired 'flag' plates from the historic British car numbering systems, for example, CAN 1 (Canada), AUS 1 (Australia), BEL 12E (Belize), BF 1 and BF 2 (Burkina Faso), CHN 1 (China), FIJ 1 (Fiji), FRA 1 (France), 1 HKG (General-Director of Hong Kong Economic and Trade Office), IC 1 (Iceland), 1 NWY (Norway), NZ 1 (New Zealand), 1 PNG (Papua New Guinea), 1 JAM (Jamaica), 1 TOG (Togo), ZIM 1 (Zimbabwe), etc.

== Embassies, high commissions, consulates and international organisations ==
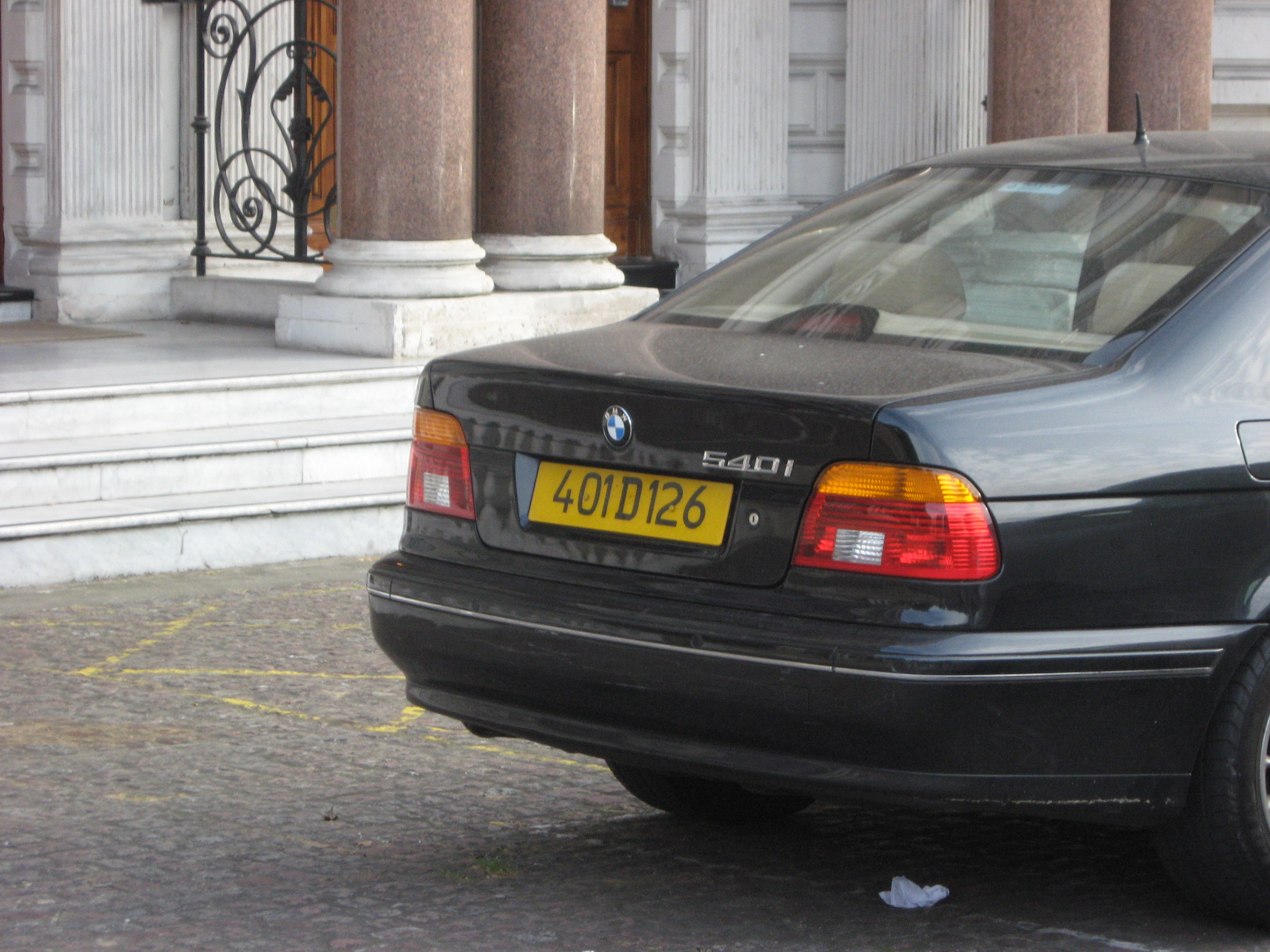
British diplomatic car plate.

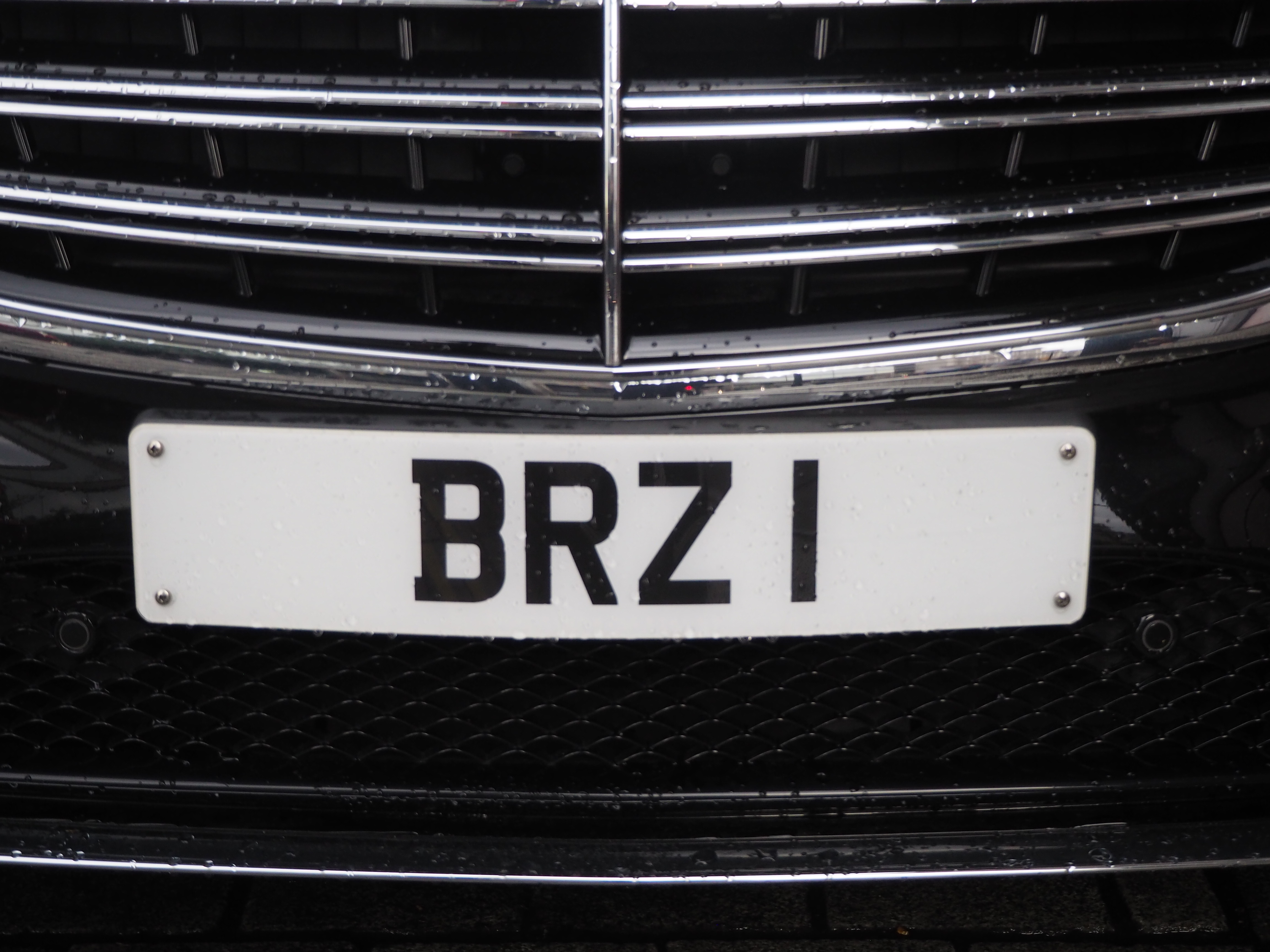
Diplomatic number plate in personalized form (BRZ = Brazil)

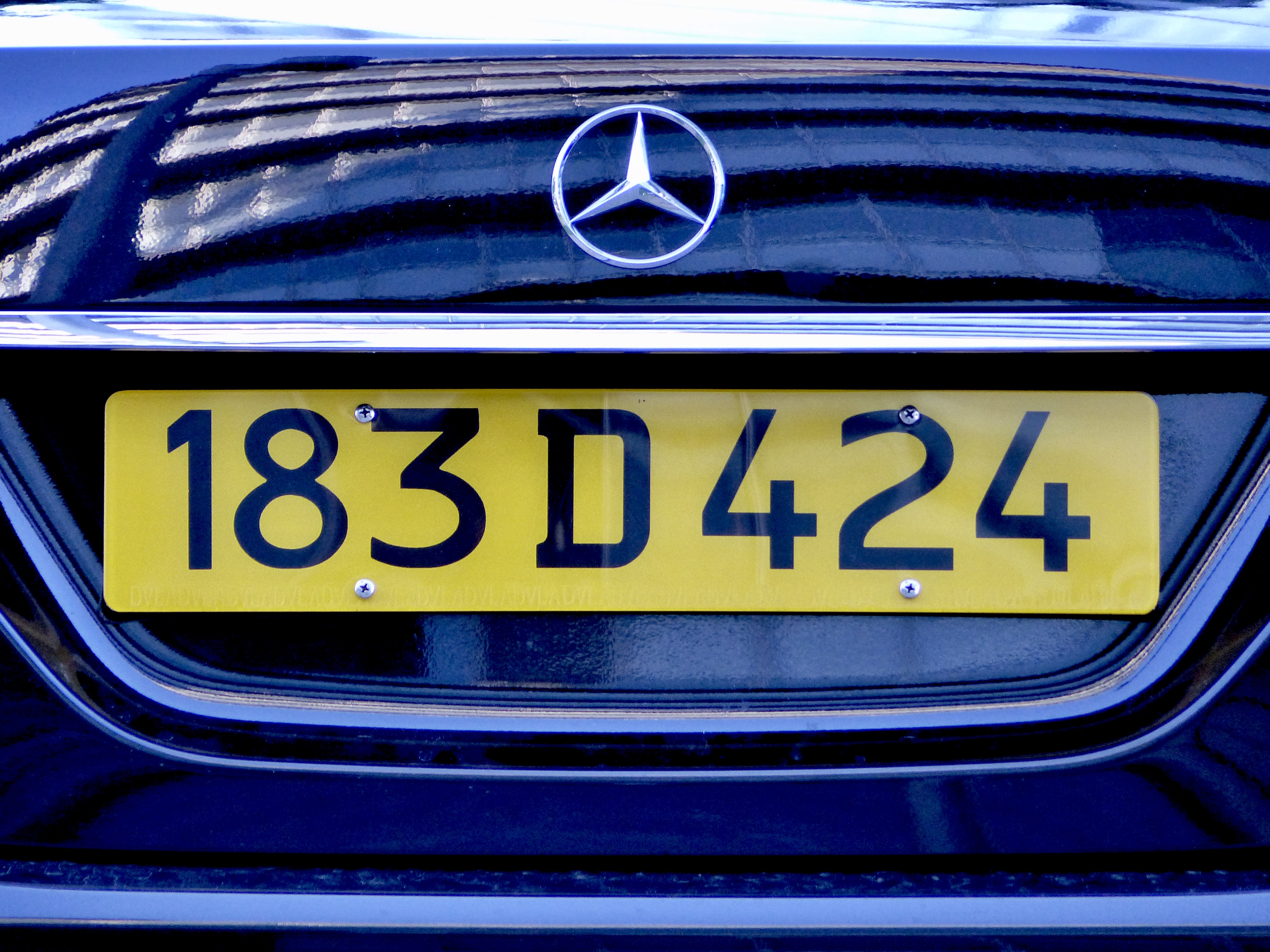
United Kingdom diplomatic number plate for diplomatic staff (183 = Iraq)

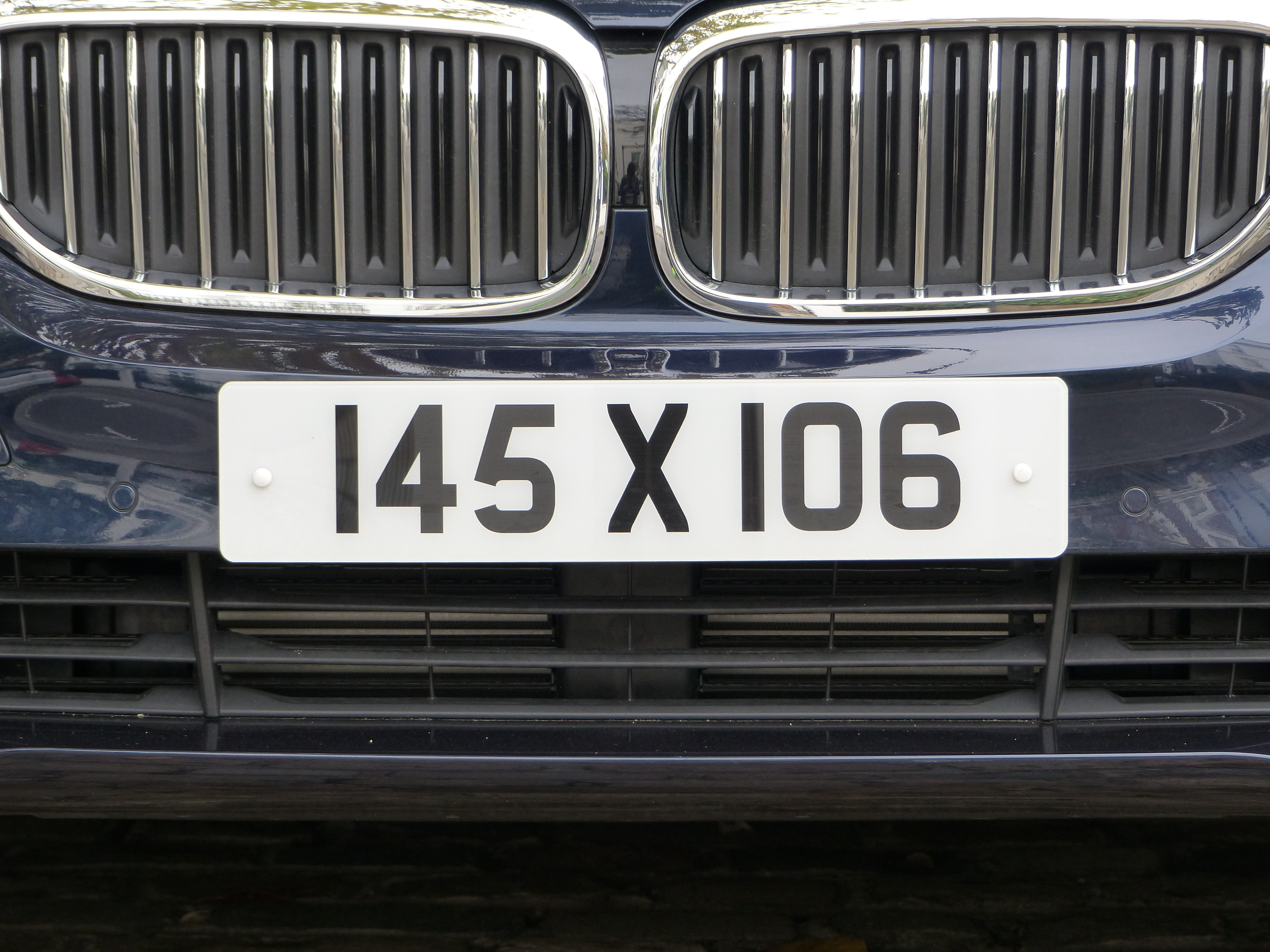
United Kingdom diplomatic number plate for non-diplomatic staff (145 = Egypt)

Number	Country or Organisation
101	Afghanistan (Islamic Republic)
102	Algeria
103	Argentina
104–108	Australia
109	Austria
110	Bahamas
111	Bahrain
112	Bangladesh
113	Barbados
114	Belgium
115	Benin
116	Bolivia
117	Botswana
118–122	Brazil
123	Bulgaria
124	Myanmar (formerly Burma)
125	Burundi
126	Cameroon
127–131	Canada
132	Central African Republic
133	Chad
134	Chile
135	China
136	Colombia
137	Republic of the Congo
138	Costa Rica
139	Cuba
140	Cyprus
141	Czech Republic
142	Denmark
143	Dominican Republic
144	Ecuador
145–147	Egypt
148	El Salvador
149	Ethiopia
150	Fiji
151	Finland
152–156	France
157	Gabon
158	Gambia
159–163	Germany
164	Moldova (formerly GDR)
165	Ghana
166–167	Greece
168	Grenada
169	Guinea
170	Guyana
171	Haiti
172	Honduras
173	Hungary
174	Iceland
175–179	India
180	Indonesia
181–182	Iran
183–184	Iraq
185	Ireland
186–187	Israel
188–190	Italy
191	Ivory Coast
192	Jamaica
193	Japan
194–195	Jordan
196	Kenya
197	South Korea
198	Kuwait
199	Laos
200	Lebanon
201	Lesotho
202	Liberia
203	Libya
204	Luxembourg
205	Malawi
206	Malaysia
207	Mali
208	Malta
209	Mauritania
210	Mauritius
211	Mexico
212	Mongolia
213	Morocco
214	Nepal
215–217	Netherlands
218–219	New Zealand
220	Nicaragua
221	Niger
222–224	Nigeria
225	Norway
226	Oman
227–228	Pakistan
229	Panama
230	Papua New Guinea
231	Paraguay
232	Peru
233	Philippines
234	Poland
235	Portugal
236	Qatar
237	Romania
238	Rwanda
239–240	Saudi Arabia
241	Senegal
242	Seychelles
243	Sierra Leone
244	Singapore
245	Somalia
246–247	South Africa
248–252	Russia (originally Soviet Union)
253–255	Spain
256	Sri Lanka
257	Sudan
258	Eswatini
259	Sweden
260	Switzerland
261	Syria
262	Tanzania
263	Thailand
264	Togo
265	Tonga
266	Trinidad and Tobago
267	Tunisia
268	Turkey
269	United Arab Emirates
270–274	United States
275	Uruguay
276	Venezuela
277	Vietnam
278–279	Yemen
280	Serbia (originally Yugoslavia)
281	Democratic Republic of the Congo (formerly Zaire)
282	Zambia
283	Dominica
284	Monaco
285	Nauru
286	Saint Lucia
287	Uganda
288	Burkina Faso
289	Saint Vincent and the Grenadines
290	Zimbabwe
291	Vatican City
292	East Caribbean
293	Belize
294	Brunei
295	Antigua and Barbuda
296	Angola
297	Guatemala
298	Mozambique
299	Namibia
300	Lithuania
301	Armenia
302	Slovenia
303	Latvia
304	Estonia
305	Croatia
306	Ukraine
307	Slovakia
308	Belarus
309	Albania
310	Azerbaijan
311	North Macedonia
312	Bosnia and Herzegovina
313	Uzbekistan
314	Eritrea
315	Kazakhstan
316	Georgia
317	Maldives
318	Turkmenistan
319	Kyrgyzstan
320	Saint Kitts and Nevis
321	Montenegro
324	San Marino
328	South Sudan
330	Kosovo
350–399	May be used by any embassy for security reasons
600–649	May be used by visiting royalty on official vehicles
900	Commonwealth Secretariat
901	(Council of Europe) European Commission
902	Council of Europe
903	European Centre for Medium-Range Weather Forecasts
904	North-East Atlantic Fisheries Commission
905	(Council of Europe) European Parliament
906	Inter-American Development Bank
907	International Maritime Organization
908	International Cocoa Organization
909	International Coffee Organization
910	International Finance Corporation
911	International Labour Organization
912	International Sugar Organization
913	European Police College
914	International Whaling Commission
915	International Wheat Council
916	(NATO) North Atlantic Treaty Organization
917	United Nations
918	Western European Union
919	World Health Organization
920	Eastern Caribbean Commission
921	Joint European Torus
922	International Oil Pollution Compensation Fund
923	International Maritime Satellite Organisation
924	Commonwealth Foundation
925	International Maritime Organization (Permanent Representative)
926	Commonwealth Telecommunications Bureau
927	United Nations High Commissioner for Refugees
928	Commonwealth Agricultural Bureaux
929	International Lead and Zinc Corporation
931	Joint European Torus
932	North Atlantic Salmon Conservation Organization
933	European Investment Bank
934	European Telecommunications Satellite Organisation
935	European School (Oxford)
936	African Development Bank
937	European Bank for Reconstruction and Development
938	European Bank for Reconstruction and Development
940	European Bioinformatics Institute
941	European Medicines Agency
943	Oslo and Paris Commissions
944	European Banking Authority
963	Hong Kong Economic and Trade Office
