= George Drabble =

British businessman (1824–1899)

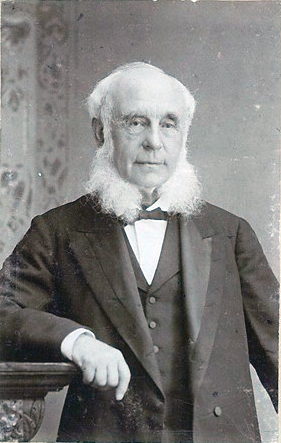
- Born: 24 April 1824; Sheffield, South Yorkshire, United Kingdom
- Died: 2 October 1899 (aged 75); Sandown, Isle of Wight, United Kingdom
- Education: Sheffield Grammar School

George Wilkinson Drabble (24 April 1824 – 2 October 1899) was a British businessman, known for investing in railways and banks in Argentina and Uruguay, and founding the River Plate Fresh Meat Company.

== Business career ==
Drabble arrived in Uruguay in 1847 with his younger brother, Charles Thompson, in the middle of a civil war, to establish an agency for the family firm, called "Drabble Brothers". This agency also had settlements in London, Manchester and Sheffield. In 1849, he went to Argentina with his brother Alfred, to establish another agency for the firm.

=== Banking and railway financing ===
In Argentina, Drabble became a director in the 'Banco y Casa de Moneda', a predecessor that was established by Juan Manuel de Rosas to the current Casa de Moneda de la República Argentina. He also served as president of the Buenos Aires Stock Exchange, from 1862 to 1863. Drabble did business in the River Plate until 1867 where he returned to England to rejoin the family's businesses in Manchester. In 1869, Drabble moved to London as chairman of the Board of Directors of the Banco de Londres y Río de la Plata, a seat he would maintain for over 30 years.

Drabble had a great influence on British companies operating in the River Plate and on the decisions of various local governments. He was a member of the Board of the Central Argentine Railway, and the president of Compañía del Ferrocarril a Campana, the constructor of the Buenos Aires and Rosario Railway. While in Uruguay, he was chairman of three railway companies, the 'Central Uruguay Eastern Extension Railway', the 'Central Uruguay Northern Extension Railway', and the 'Central Uruguay Railway Company of Montevideo'.

=== Rosario incident ===
In 1876, an incident occurred between the local government of the province of Santa Fe and the Banco de Londres y Río de la Plata. The Santa Fe government, supported by the president Nicolás Avellaneda, ordered the liquidation of the local Banco de Londres y Río de la Plata branch in Rosario after a law was passed prohibiting any non-governmental organization converting paper money to gold. The bank branch refused to back down leading to an international incident when its gold reserves were seized and the branch manager arrested. In June of that year, Drabble went to Argentina replacing the British ambassador in the negotiations. Upstream on the Paraná River, the HMS Beacon was dispatched as gunboat diplomacy to support Drabble's negotiations. The branch manager was released, the liquidation order was rectified, and the gold was returned to the bank.

=== River Plate Fresh Meat Company ===
In 1882, Drabble and his brother James Drabble, founded the River Plate Fresh Meat Company, in an attempt to use the refrigeration in the international meat industry, after buying in 1877 two De La Vergne refrigeration machines, which produced up to 5,000 kg of ice per day and lowered the temperature in the cold rooms to −10 °C. Its headquarters were located in London, On 25 November 1883, it made its first shipment of refrigerated meat, which arrived successfully in London in January 1884. The main factory was settled in Campana, while a Uruguayan factory was settled in Real de San Carlos, near Colonia. The Uruguayan factory closed in 1888 but still bought sheep from Uruguay, which was then sent to the factory in Argentina. Argentine meat was offered in London at a significantly lower price than meat from the United States, and was therefore very successful. After a fire in 1924 in the Argentine factory, the company had to close down in 1926.

== Personal life and death ==
Drabble was born on 24 April 1824 in Sheffield, and he studied at the Sheffield Grammar School. He married Elisabeth White on 11 March 1857 at the St. Andrew's Scots Presbyterian Church and had 5 children. His family home in London was located at No. 1 Pembridge Square. He died on 2 October 1899 of a kidney failure on Sandown, in the Isle of Wight.

In honour to him, there is a railway station called Drabble in the district of General Villegas, Furthermore, in Uruguay, the current town of José Enrique Rodó, grew up around a railway station inaugurated in 1901 under the name of Estación Drabble.

== See also ==
- List of railway stations named after people
- British investment in Argentina
