= Masons Arms =

Masons Arms is the name of:

- Mason's Arms, Battersea, a pub in London
- Masons Arms, Kensal Green, a pub in London
- Masons Arms, York, a pub in Yorkshire
