= Whiteleys =

Former department store and shopping centre in London

Coordinates: 51°30′52.6″N 0°11′18.4″W

The Whiteley
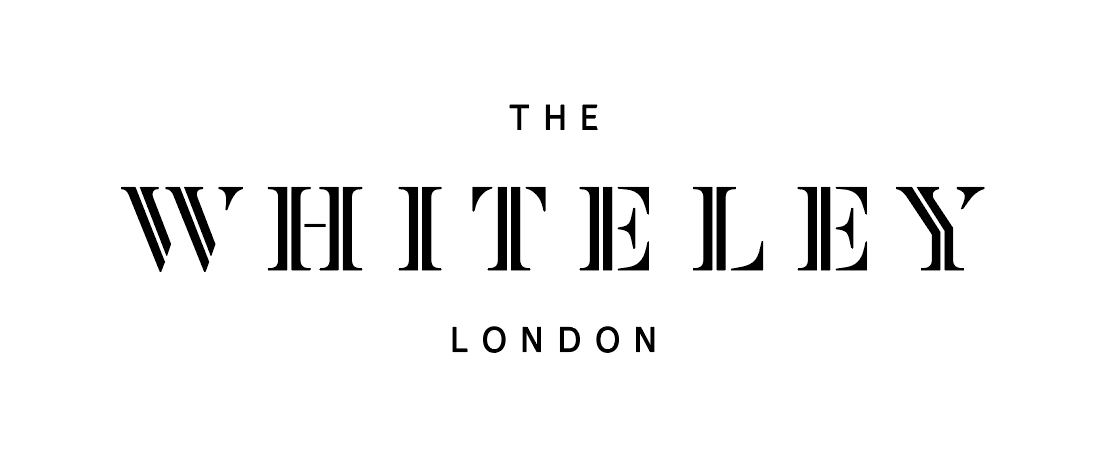

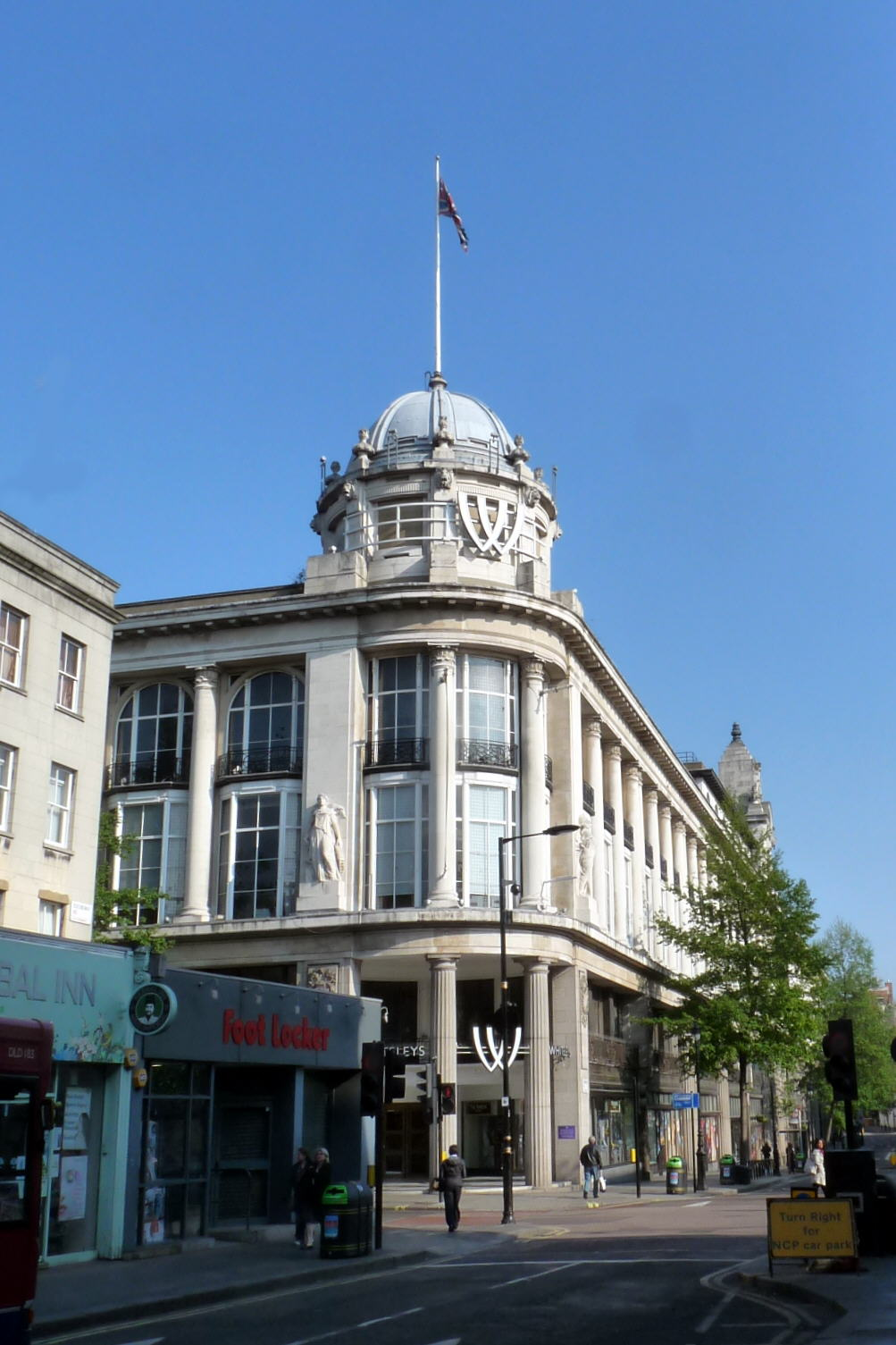
- Type: Private company
- Industry: Mixed-use asset
- Founded: 2 November 1911; 115 years ago (as departement stores) July 26, 1989 (as shopping centre)
- Founder: William Whiteley
- Defunct: December 2018 (as shopping centre)
- Headquarters: Bayswater, London, W2; England
- Area served: United Kingdom
- Services: Property investment, Housing development, Six Senses hotel
- Owner: Meyer Bergman and C C Land
- Website: www.thewhiteleylondon.com

Whiteleys was a shopping centre in Bayswater, London. It was built in the retail space of the former William Whiteley Limited department store, which opened in 1911 as one of London's first department stores, and was one of the main department stores, alongside Selfridge's, Liberty's and Harrods. The centre's main entrance was located on Queensway.

The building is owned by Meyer Bergman and CC Land. In December 2018, Whiteleys was closed for redevelopment. It has been converted into a Norman Foster-designed mixed-use asset comprising 139 condominium apartments, the UK's first Six Senses hotel, and retail units on the ground floor.

== History ==
=== Original store ===
The original Whiteleys department store was created by William Whiteley, who started a drapery shop at 31 Westbourne Grove in 1863. By 1867 it had expanded to a row of shops containing 17 departments.

Dressmaking was started in 1868, and a house agency and refreshment room, the first ventures outside drapery, opened in 1872. By that time 622 people were employed on the premises and a further 1,000 outside. Whiteleys started selling food in 1875, and a building and decorating department was added in 1876. This proved to be particularly profitable, as the large stuccoed houses in the area needed regular repainting.

Whiteleys met strong opposition from smaller tradesmen, and also from the local authorities over its grand building plans, and several bad fires in the 1880s may have been caused by opponents. Business nonetheless prospered, aided by a delivery service extending up to 25 miles (40 km), and in 1887 the store was described as "an immense symposium of the arts and industries of the nation and of the world".

By 1890 over 6,000 staff were employed in the business, most of them living in company-owned male and female dormitories, having to obey 176 rules and working 7 am to 11 pm, six days a week. Whiteleys also bought massive farmlands and erected food-processing factories to provide produce for the store and for staff catering. In 1896 it earned an unsolicited Royal Warrant from Queen Victoria, an unprecedented achievement.

=== Westbourne Grove fire and reopening ===
The first store – described as "an immense symposium of the arts and industries of the nation and of the world" – was devastated in an enormous fire in 1887, one of the largest fires in London's history. This was the last of four fires that had devastated the business from 1882. In his autobiography, Drawn From Memory, E. H. Shepard said the fire could be seen from Highgate Hill, and – some days later when he and his brother Cyril were allowed to visit Westbourne Grove – that "The long front of the shop was a sorry sight with part of the wall fallen and the rest blackened." Whiteleys was soon rebuilt, but later moved from Westbourne Grove to Queensway.

=== Relocation ===
In 1907, William Whiteley was murdered by Horace George Rayner, who claimed to be his illegitimate son, "Cecil Whiteley". After his death, the board (including two of Whiteley's sons) allowed the leases on the various Westbourne Grove properties to lapse, and moved the business into a new purpose-built store on Queens Road (now called Queensway).

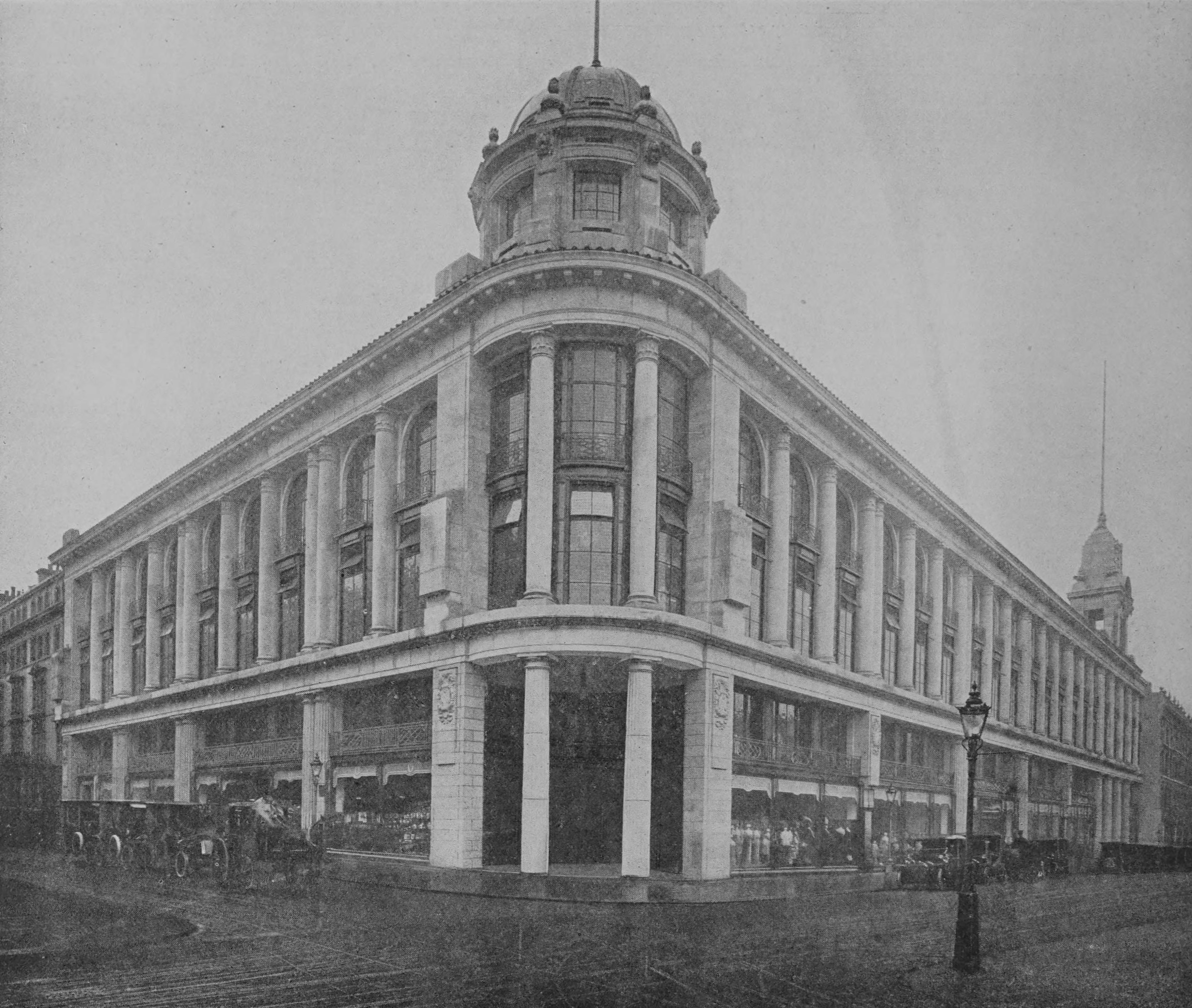
The store as it appeared at opening in 1911

This new store, designed by John Belcher and John James Joass, was opened by the Lord Mayor of London on 2 November 1911, in the presence of thousands; it was claimed to be the largest shop in the world. The building was further extended between 1925 and 1927 to incorporate the present frontage. In 1927 the store was bought by Harry Gordon Selfridge, an American from Ripon, Wisconsin, who had experience with department stores in Chicago and had come to England to seek new business opportunities. He had built Selfridge's at 400 Oxford Street, which had opened to the public on 15 March 1909.

Whiteley's received bomb damage from an air raid on 19 October 1940. The Second World War air raid damage, along with the earlier fires and subsequent changes in ownership, led to the loss of many of the archives associated with the store.

In the 1950s the chairman Sir Sydney Harold Gillet announced that the store was too big for its turnover, and converted the upper floors of the building into office space. These were used by LEO Computers Ltd. in the 1950s and later by International Computers Limited (ICL) for offices and training facilities in the 1970s. The offices were named "Hartree House" after Douglas Rayner Hartree, in recognition of his part in the LEO Computers story. Esso Petroleum also rented some of the office space.

=== Purchase by United Drapery Stores ===
In 1961, United Drapery Stores (UDS) purchased Whiteleys for £1,750,000. In the late 1970s, UDS held a market survey to find out if the losses of the business were down to customer satisfaction. The survey came back positive: it proved that Whiteleys did not have enough customers.

The department store closed down in 1981, remaining empty until the building was purchased by a firm called the Whiteleys Partnership in 1986, consisting of Arlington Securities, London and Metropolitan Estates, Wilverley & Hampshire Estates and Dartnorth, which was later acquired by the Standard Life Assurance Company. Extensive reconstruction followed; the façade and some interior features such as stairs and railings remained, but essentially the building was demolished and rebuilt. During this reconstruction a tower crane collapsed, killing the driver of the crane and seriously injuring an electrician who was also in the cab of the crane at the time of the incident. Whiteleys reopened on 26 July 1989 as a shopping centre.

=== Purchase by Meyer Bergman ===
In September 2013, the centre was purchased by Meyer Bergman.

In December 2018, Whiteleys closed for redevelopment in parallel with Meyer Bergman's regeneration of Queensway Parade, which faces the building. The project was planned to deliver a mix of street-level retail units, 65% less retail space than before, with a gym and a cinema, while the upper floors – levels one to nine (excluding level 4) – were to be converted for residential use and a hotel.

In October 2019, Laing O'Rourke was announced as the winner of the prized construction contract over rival Sir Robert McAlpine to overhaul the old shopping centre.

== Products and services ==
=== Design and layout ===
The new Whiteleys store opened in 1911 was the height of luxury at the time, including both a theatre and – on the roof – a golf course. It appears in a number of early 20th-century novels and in George Bernard Shaw's 1913 play Pygmalion, in which Eliza Doolittle is sent "to Whiteleys to be attired". In the late 1920s Dr. A. J. Cronin, the novelist, was appointed the medical officer of Whiteleys, and in 1927 rival store Selfridges purchased the business. The building was designated a Grade II listed building in 1970.

Whiteleys was re-opened as a shopping centre on 26 July 1989. The shopping centre never worked as a retail destination, and became much maligned by the wealthy and sophisticated residents of nearby Notting Hill.

Since 2005, a slow change of direction began under a new management regime which incorporated substantial physical improvements to the interior, the replacement of McDonald's with Rowley Leigh's new restaurant Le Café Anglais and a new food hall in the central mall area. Onsite management claimed in the press that this was the start of a transformation of the building and its shops. The ground-floor fountain, with its inspiring sculpture, suddenly disappeared unannounced around that time.

In June 2008, the ground floor was transformed into what the management called a 'foodstore'; essentially a larger, more glamorous version of a department store foodhall, designed by Lifeschutz Davidson Sandilands and operated by renowned restaurateur Dominic Ford. Called 'Food Inc', it sold fresh fish, meat, dry goods, wine and meat from the shopping centre's own farm.

== In popular culture ==
Whiteleys is mentioned in several books and has appeared in numerous films and TV shows, most notably:

- It is mentioned in the book The Diary of a Nobody written by the brothers George and Weedon Grossmith, published in June 1892.
- In War of the Wenuses, an 1898 parody of The War of the Worlds, one of the main battles between Earth women and Venusian women takes place outside the original store in Westbourne Grove.
- The main entrance is shown briefly in the 1953 film Park Plaza 605.
- Whiteleys is cited as the "common knowledge" location to buy a woman's dress in the 1964 film My Fair Lady.
- In the 1967 film Billion Dollar Brain, the hero uses an X-Ray machine in Whiteleys' shoe department to examine the contents of a sealed package.
- In the TV series Minder Series 2 Episode 12 "Caught in the Act, Fact"
- In the TV series adaption of The Tripods, filmed in 1983, the run-down Whiteleys building is used to portray an abandoned department store in 21st-century Paris.
- Whiteley’s Folly by Linda Stratmann (2004, Sutton Publishing) is a biography of William Whiteley, and a history of the store.
- In the film Closer, starring Julia Roberts, Jude Law, Natalie Portman and Clive Owen, the upper floor of Whiteleys hosts an art gallery exhibition, and is the only scene in which all four stars appear together at the same time.
- Scenes were filmed there for the 2013 BBC One thriller series The Escape Artist.
- In 2016 the store was featured extensively in the storyline of the popular ITV drama Mr Selfridge, the 1927 takeover by Selfridge being portrayed.
- The store is mentioned alongside Harrods in several P. G. Wodehouse novels, including Love Among the Chickens
- In the TV show Vicious, Season 1, The Christmas Special, the main character Freddie is noted as playing Father Christmas at Whiteleys.
- It is also depicted in 2 Bollywood films: Lamhe (the sweater unraveling scene) and Kabhi Khushi Kabhi Gham (the internet cafe)
