= Balguy =

Balguy is a surname. Notable people with the surname include:

- Charles Balguy (1708–1767), English physician and translator
- John Balguy (1686–1748), English clergyman and philosopher
- Thomas Balguy (1716–1795), English archdeacon
- Thomas Balguy (headmaster) (died 1696), father of John Balguy and grandfather of Thomas Balguy above
