= Sheffield Grammar School =

School in Sheffield, England, 1604 to 1905

Coordinates: 53.376°N 1.495°W

Information
- Motto: Verbum tuum lucerna pedibus meis (Thy word is a lamp unto my feet)
- Established: 1604
- Closed: 1905

Sheffield Grammar School was a grammar school in Sheffield, Yorkshire, England. Founded in 1604 as "The Free Grammar School of James King of England within the Town of Sheffield in the County of York", in 1885 it was renamed as Sheffield Royal Grammar School. In 1905 it was merged into King Edward VII School, Sheffield.

== History ==
The school resulted from a benefaction of Thomas Smith of Crowland in Lincolnshire, a native of Sheffield, who in his will of 1603 left £30 a year for ever to pay two schoolmasters. His executor made over to the Governors £200 in money to be invested and also land at Leverington in Cambridgeshire which produced an income of £21 a year in rent. The Governors thus had £30 (equivalent to £9,115 in 2023) to pay a Master and an Usher.

In William White's Gazetteer and General Directory of Sheffield and Twenty Miles Round (1852), he described the school as

"... a commodious and handsome stone building in Charlotte Street, erected by subscription in 1825, in lieu of the ancient school which stood near the top of Townhead Street. It was founded by letters patent of James I in 1604, and the Vicar and Church Burgesses are the trustees and governors".

In the 19th century the school had other homes. James A. Figorski describes the premises at St. George's Square, which the school occupied in 1868, as follows:

"It was a stone building which I think was in keeping with St. George's Church. From St. George's Square you entered through a stone archway and there to the left was the small caretaker's house, and then the pathway went round to the porch, into which the main door opened to the large main room of the school. The floor was stone flagged and was very cold in winter. A stove stood in the centre of the room, cracked and worn. We had no gas, and water was turned on into an old stone trough at play-hours outside the school"

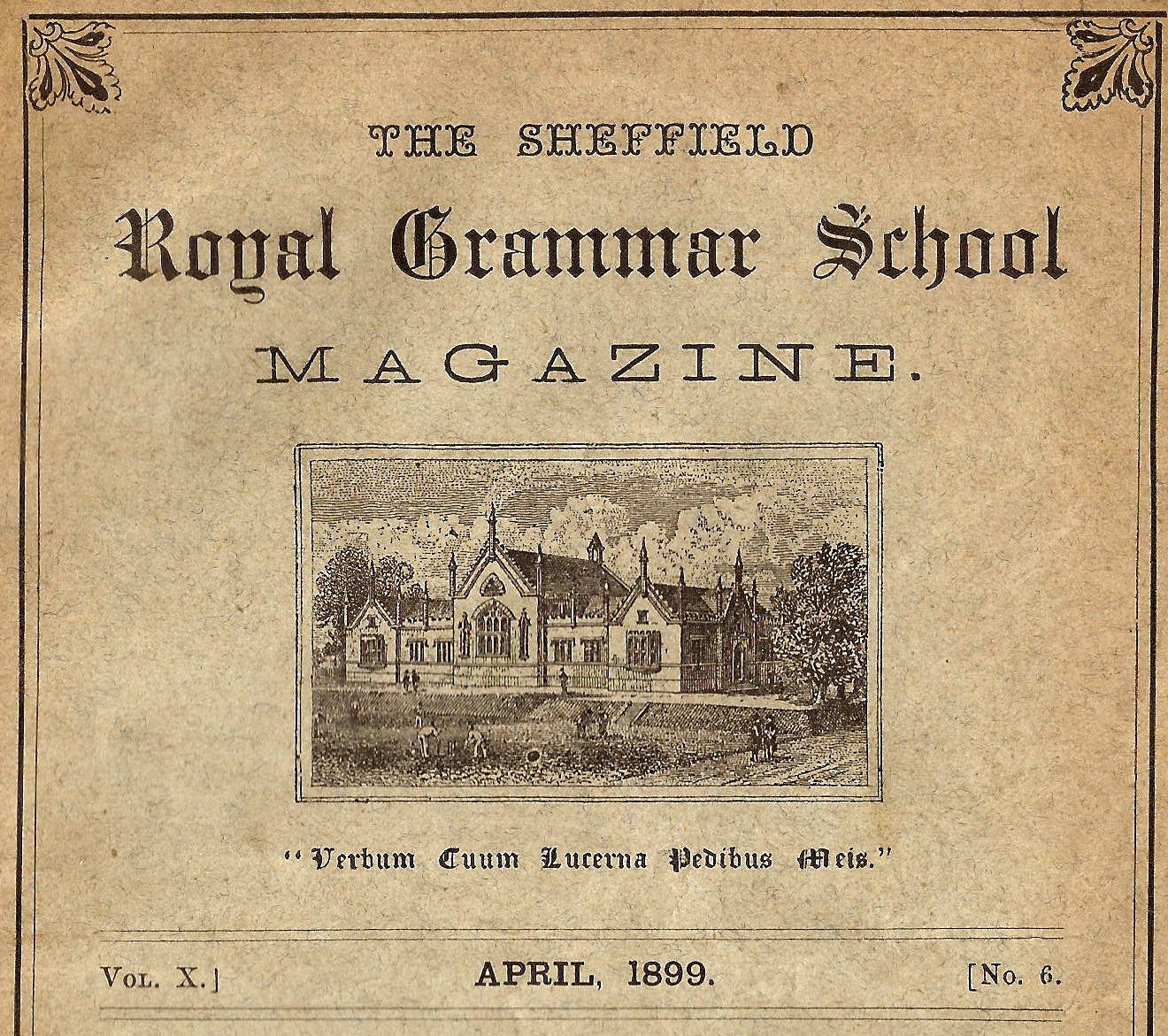
Cover of the SRGS magazine, April 1899

In 1884, the Governors of the school paid £7,000 to buy the buildings on Collegiate Crescent of the Sheffield Collegiate School, which ceased to exist. The grammar school moved onto the site and the next year was renamed as Sheffield Royal Grammar School (SRGS).

In 1905 Sheffield City Council acquired both Wesley College and SRGS and they were merged on the site of the former to form King Edward VII School (KES), named after the reigning monarch.

In 1936, the Governors of the Grammar School Foundation were still administering the endowments of the former grammar school for the benefit of King Edward VII School.

In 1905, the SRGS buildings became part of a new Training College. They later transferred to Sheffield Hallam University as part of its Collegiate campus.

== Headmasters of Sheffield Grammar School ==
- 1604–1606 — John Smith
- 1606–1608 — Henry Saxton, M.A.
- 1608–1615 — John Hancock, M.A.
- 1615–1619 — George Young, B.A.
- 1619–1622 — Andrew Wade, M.A.
- 1622 acting — George Wade
- 1623–1625 — Godfrey Mason
- 1625–1644 — Thomas Rawson, B.A.
- 1645–1648 — William Young, B.A
- 1648–1651 — Peter Lanfitt, B.A.
- 1648 — Roger Steare, B.A.
- 1651–1658 — William Whitaker, M.A.
- 1658–1663 — Francis Potts, M.A.
- 1664–1696 — Thomas Balguy, M.A.
- 1696–1698 — Charles Daubuz, M.A.
- 1698–1703 — Marmaduke Drake, M.A.
- 1703–1709 — George Lee, B.A.
- 1709–1720 — William Humpton, M.A.
- 1720–1734 — Christopher Robinson, M.A.
- 1734–1748 — John Cliff, B.A.
- 1748–1759 — Thomas Marshall, B.A.
- 1759–1776 — John Smith, M.A.
- 1776 acting — Edward Goodwin
- 1776–1809 — Charles Chadwick, B.A.
- 1809 — Joseph Richardson, M.A.
- 1810–1818 — Joseph Wilson, B.A.
- 1818–1830 — William White, M.A.
- 1830–1863 — Percival Bowen, M.A.
- 1863–1884 — Joseph E. Jackson, M.A. Ph.D. D.CL.
- 1884–1899 — Edward Senior, M.A.
- 1899–1905 — Arthur B. Haslam, M.A.

== Notable old boys of Sheffield Grammar School ==
- John Balguy (1686–1748) – divine and philosopher (NB His father Thomas Balguy was Head 1664–1696)
- George Wilkinson Drabble (1824–1899) – businessman
- Charles Sargeant Jagger MC (1885–1934) – war memorials sculptor
- Edward Keble Chatterton (1878–1944) – prolific author on maritime and naval themes
- Robert Murray Gilchrist (1867–1917) – novelist and Peak District author
- Kenneth Kirk (1886–1954) – Bishop of Oxford from 1937 to 1954
- John Roebuck (1718–1794) – inventor
- Reverend Walter Stanley Senior (1876–1938), the "Bard of Lanka", SRGS pupil from 1888 to 1891
- Sir Samuel Gillott (1838–1913) – Mayor of Melbourne, Australian Attorney General, and Employment Minister 1904–06

== Notable staff of Sheffield Grammar School ==
- Mountford John Byrde Baddeley (1843–1906) – guidebook writer, classics master (1880-1884)
- Sir Sydney John Chapman (1871–1951) – Chief Economic Adviser to HM Government from 1927 to 1932, schoolmaster at Sheffield Royal Grammar School from 1893 to 1895
