= River Plate Fresh Meat Company =

English meat-packing company

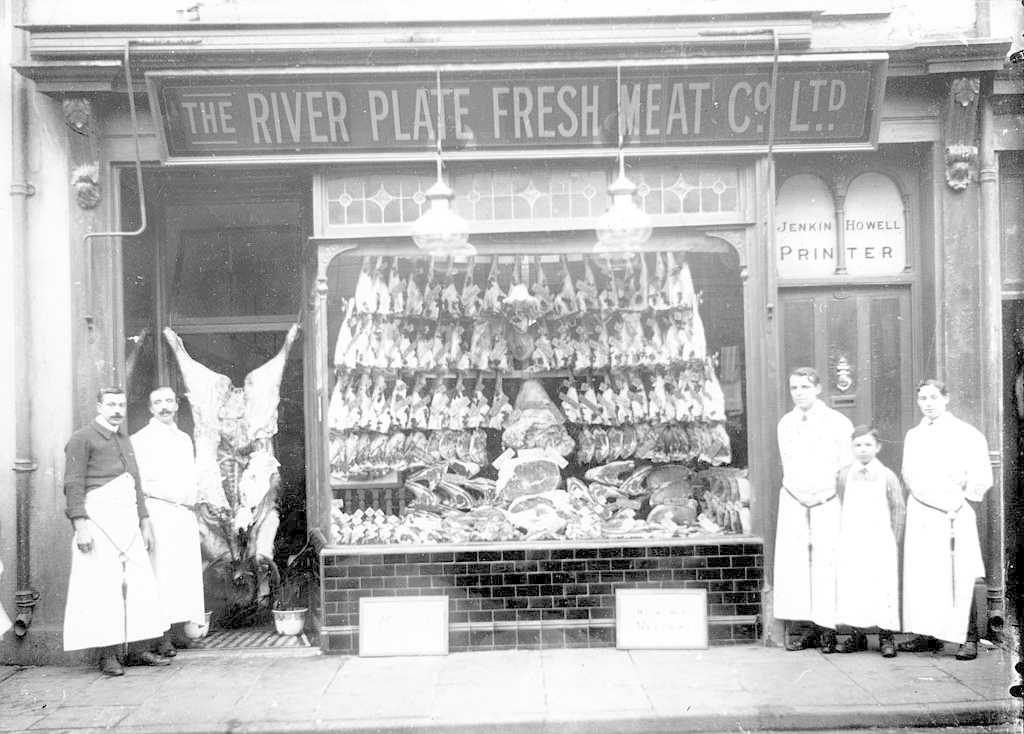
- Type: Private
- Industry: Meat-packing industry
- Founded: 1882
- Founder: George Wilkinson Drabble
- Defunct: 1926
- Headquarters: London

The River Plate Fresh Meat Company was the first meat-packing industry that used refrigeration in South America. It operated in Argentina, Uruguay, and the United Kingdom, it was founded in 1882 by George Wilkinson Drabble. They are believed to be responsible for the name of Argentine association football club "Club Atlético River Plate" and the asado de tira. On 30 July 1924 the main factory, located in South America, suffered a major fire in the refrigeration department, it's considered one of the reasons of the closure of the company in 1926.

== History ==
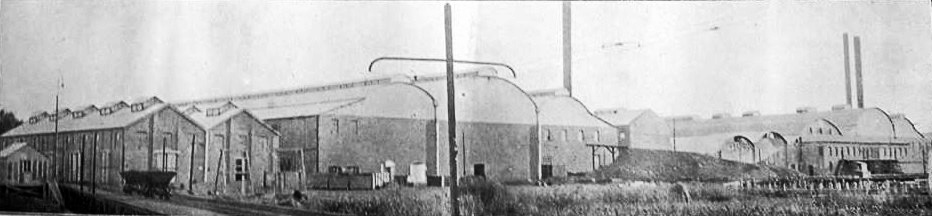
Panoramic view of the factory in Campana, c. 1900

The River Plate Fresh Meat Company was founded in London in 1882 by Drabble and his brother James Drabble, in an attempt to use the refrigeration in the international meat industry, after buying in 1877 two De La Vergne refrigeration machines, which produced up to 5,000 kg of ice per day and lowered the temperature in the cold rooms to −10 °C. This made it possible to preserve meat without drying it or salting it before export, as had been the case previously. Its South American factory was in Campana, Argentina. On 25 November 1883, it made its first shipment of refrigerated meat, which arrived successfully in London in January 1884. The company started with an initial capital of 250,000 pounds. As a way to compete with New Zealand meat companies, Drabble introduced the Lincoln race, as sheep from the River Plate were too small compared to the New Zealand sheep.

In 1884, Drabble expanded the company to Uruguay, setting up a base in Real de San Carlos, which was dedicated to the export of refrigerated sheep meat. In 1888, the Uruguayan factory was closed due to the tariff war with Argentina, but the company continued to purchase sheep in Uruguay, which it transported across the River Plate.

Following rapid growth, the River Plate Fresh Meat Company merged with other companies in 1897 to form the Cold Storage Company with a capital of £12,758,217 and took over the business of the British and Argentine Meat Co. (including James Nelson & Sons and The River Plate Fresh Meat Co.), Eastmans Ltd., Proprietors of Fletchers Ltd owned by W. and R. Fletcher, Argenta Meat Co., British Beef Co., North Australian Meat Co., Lonsdale and Thompson & Co., John Layton & Co., Donald Cook & Son, Blackfriars and Carterage Co. and Pure Ice Co. Ltd, and also held a stake in the Blue Star Line of Meat Transports, which had a capital of £3,250,000.

The export volume of the River Plate Fresh Meat Company was as follows:

Product	1901	1904	1905	1906	1907	1908	1909	1912	1913
Frozen sheep and lambs		865.000	692.000	554.000	424.000	485.000	408.666	261.166	234.322
Frozen beef quarters	29.919	349.000	383.000	409.000	349.000	456.000	238.815	371.339	267.491
Chilled beef quarters	29.919	349.000	383.000	409.000	349.000	456.000	184.903	237.338	263.742

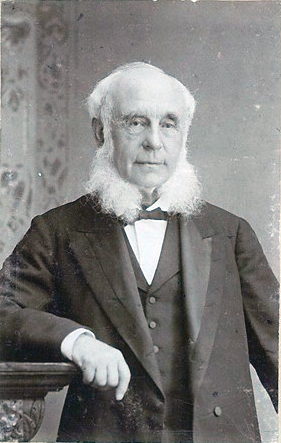
George Wilkinson Drabble

The first engineer and manager of the company in Argentina was John Angus, under whose leadership a large part of the facilities in Campana were built. In 1893, he moved to Buenos Aires to serve as the company's manager, a position he held until 1905, when he retired. In 1899, George Wilkinson Drabble died, and Henry Bell took over as chairman for three years. His successor was Charles Drabble, who was in turn succeeded by John A. Wood as chairman, with Drabble continuing to serve as a director. John Wood had been manager and secretary in London since the company's founding, and Sidney Young, who had been with the company since 1884, succeeded him in that role.

=== Reformer Athletic Club ===
British employees of the River Plate Fresh Meat Company, founded a multi-sporting club by the name of Reformer Athletic Club in 1903, it was mainly known for playing association football, but played other sports like athletics, bocce, cricket, and tennis. The team dissolved in 1910.

=== In the United Kingdom ===
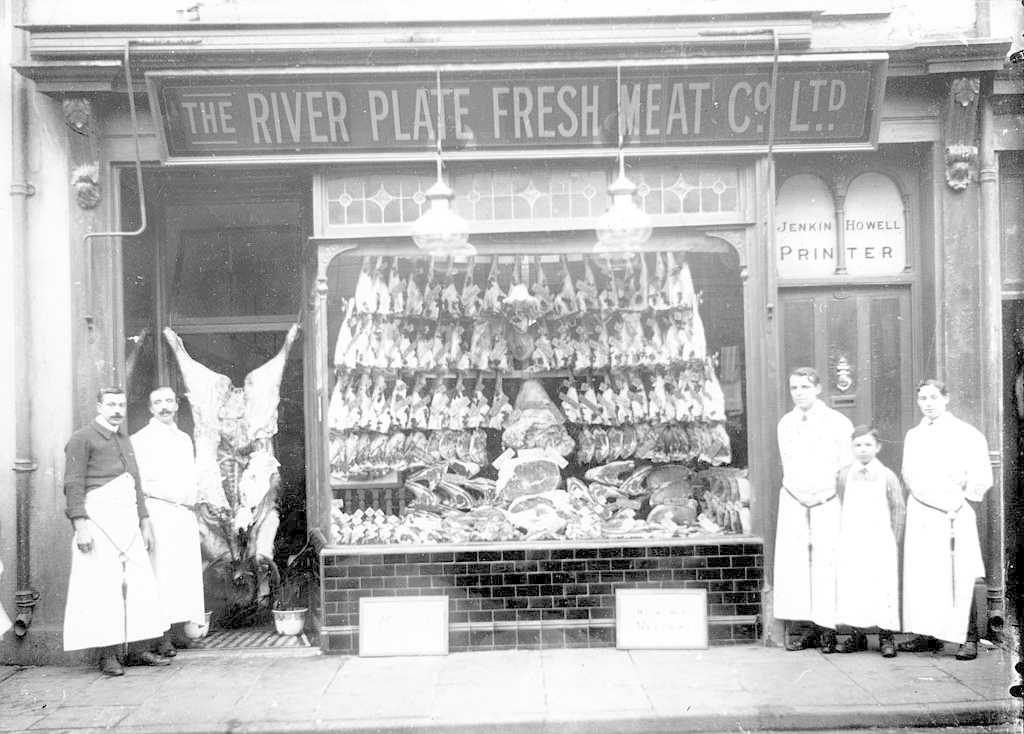
Welsh store of the company

The majority of Argentine meat was bought by Britishmen, that wanted cuts with more meat with fewer bones and grease. By 1900, the River Plate Meat Company already had 100 sales branches in the United Kingdom, which attracted attention with their uniform signage. The company's London offices were located at Cecil House, Holborn Viaduct. The company achieved high trading profits of £67,822 in 1901, which increased to £272,475 in 1902, and paid a dividend of 10% and a bonus of 2 and 4 shillings per share in those two years. After that, Argentine imports to Great Britain continued to increase, leading to competition on the London meat market with the Beef Trust of the United States and Australian and New Zealand meat exporters. Argentine meat was offered in London at a significantly lower price than meat from the United States, and was therefore very successful. Before the First World War, the company already had 440 butcher shops before merging with James Nelson Ltd. in 1914 to form the British & Argentine Meat Co.

=== Fire of the factory in Campana ===
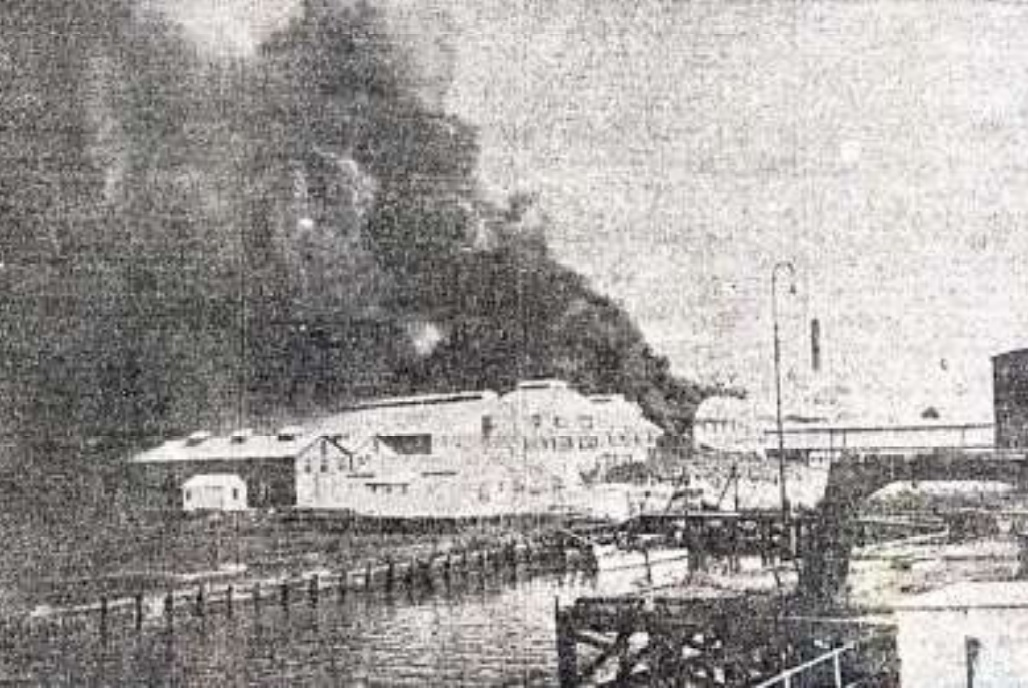
Picture of the fire, seen from the port of Campana.

On 30 July 1924, between 8.30 and 9 a.m, a major fire broke out in various places in the refrigeration department that lasted three days, which consisted of several sheds of 120 x 30 metres each, the cause of which could not be determined. This is one of the reasons why the factory was finally closed in 1926, making the company close permanently.

== Asado de Tira ==
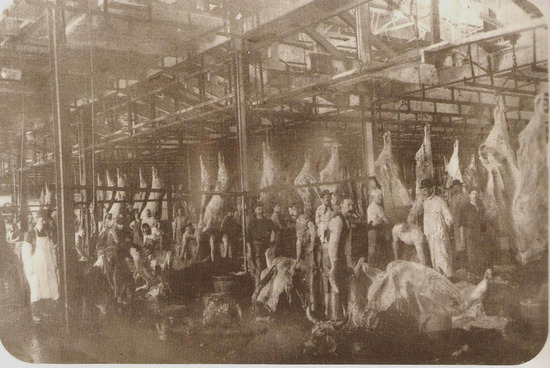
The inside of the factory with workers, c. 1910

The asado de tira was invented by workers at the River Plate Fresh Meat Company. After a steam saw imported from Europe was installed in their slaughterhouse, the beef was deboned before export. The ribs were discarded whole, as they were considered to be of low quality and little value. The factory workers, most of whom had grown up in the countryside, began cutting the separated ribs into small pieces. They took them home after work to grill them. Previously, the rib roast had been roasted whole on a spit without cutting off the ribs.
