= Kildare F.C. =

English Football club

Kildare
- Full name: Kildare Football Club
- Founded: 1877
- Dissolved: 1916
- Ground: Kensal Green
- Secretary: A.S. Gray
Home colours

Kildare Football Club was an English association football club from London.

== History ==
The club was founded in 1877 as the works side of William Whiteley Limited, named after the Kildare Terrace home address of the company founder. Its first recorded match was in October that year. The last record of the club is its seeking fixtures in 1916.

=== FA Cup entries ===
The club took part the FA Cup between 1879–80 and 1882–83, but lost in the first round each time; indeed the club only scored one goal, in a 1–1 draw with Acton in 1880–81. Even that goal was controversial, as Acton appealed it for being offside. As was normal for matches in the era, each side supplied an umpire, and they could not agree on the decision. However, unlike in most matches, there was no referee to decide between them, so the decision was passed to the Football Association after the match, which ruled in favour of Kildare. Acton however won the replay 5–0.

Its last entry to the FA Cup was in 1883–84, but, after being paired with Clapham Rovers, who had defeated the club easily the year before, the club withdrew.

=== London Senior Cup ===
The club was a founder member of the London Football Association in 1882. It entered the first London Senior Cup in 1882–83, but, after walking over Finchley in the first round, the club lost 6–1 at the Old Brightonians in the second. The club lost at Streatham Common F.C. in the first round in the following season. and then did not enter again until 1890–91; it was a regular entrant until 1911–12.

=== West End Association ===
It was a member of the West End Football Association, for clubs affiliated with the department stores in the area. The club won the West End Association Cup outright in 1893 having won the competition three years in succession.

== Colours ==
The club played in navy blue and amber shirts, white shorts, and navy blue stockings. Until 1880 a navy blue cap was also part of the kit.

== Ground ==
Originally the club played in Kensal Green, using the Mason Arms as its headquarters, and in 1881 moved to Shepherd's Bush.
