= William Whiteley =

19th/20th-century English retail entrepreneur

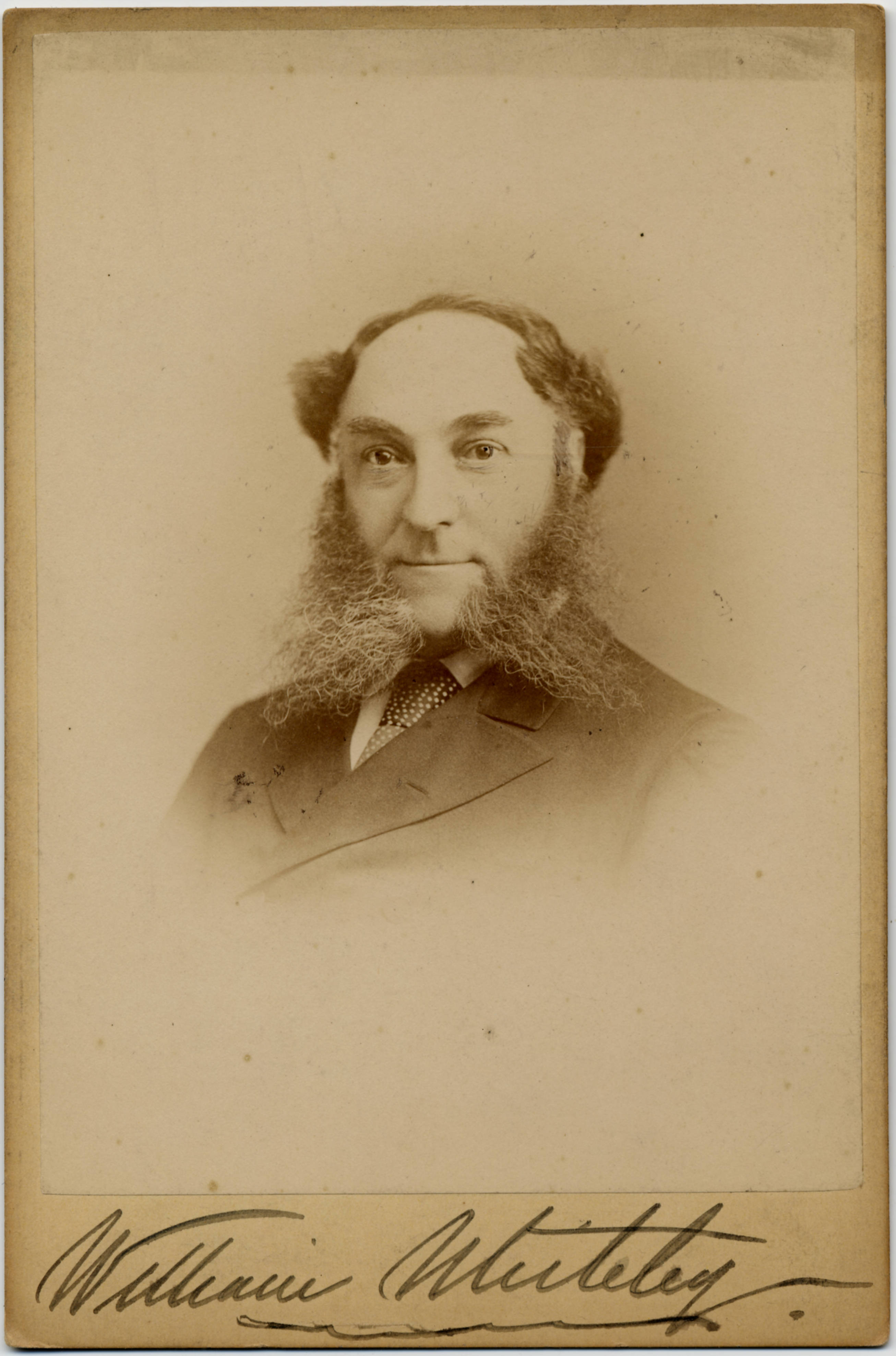
- Born: William Whiteley; 29 September 1831; Purston, Yorkshire, England
- Died: 24 January 1907 (aged 75); Bayswater, England
- Occupation: Retail entrepreneur

William Whiteley (29 September 1831 – 24 January 1907) was an English entrepreneur of the late 19th and early 20th centuries. He was the founder of the William Whiteley Limited retail company whose eponymous department store became the Whiteleys shopping centre.

== Early life ==
Whiteley was born in Yorkshire in the small village of Purston, situated between Wakefield and Pontefract. His father was a prosperous corn dealer, who had little interest in rearing his son, leaving William to be raised by an uncle. He left school at the age of 14, and started work at his uncle's farm. He would have liked to have been a veterinary surgeon or perhaps a jockey but his family had other ideas. In 1848 they started him on a seven-year apprenticeship with Harnew & Glover, the largest drapers in Wakefield. Whiteley took his new job seriously and received a "severe drilling in the arts and mysteries of the trade."

In 1851, he paid his first visit to London to see the Great Exhibition. The exhibition fired his imagination, particularly the magnificent displays of manufactured goods. All that could be bought or sold was on display, but nothing was for sale. Whiteley had the idea that he could create a store as grand as the Crystal Palace where all these goods could be under one roof and it would make him the most important shopkeeper in the world. Wakefield, once the centre of the Yorkshire woollen trade, was in decline and Whiteley now wanted to be something more than a small town draper. On completion of his apprenticeship he arrived in London with £10 in his pocket.

== Business career ==
He took a job with R. Willey & Company in Ludgate Hill, and then Morrison & Dillon's to learn all aspects of the trade. Whiteley lived frugally. Not smoking or drinking, he was able to save £700, enough to start his own business. In 1863 he opened a Fancy Goods shop (drapery) at 31 Westbourne Grove, Bayswater, employing two girls to serve and a boy to run errands. Later one of the girls, Harriet Sarah Hall (or possibly Hill, based on marriage records), became his wife.

Although friends warned him that the location was not promising, his business grew, eventually requiring fifteen employees. He made a consistent practice of marking all goods in plain figures and of making his shop window attractive, and was satisfied with small profits. He began buying more shops in Westbourne Grove, and by 1875 he owned an unbroken row of shopfronts. At the time when he opened his first store, Westbourne Grove was an upper middle-class area serving a wealthy clientele, but this area was declining in social status and popularity. Whiteley then began to develop more of a mass market appeal. He transformed his humble linen drapery into London's first department store by adding a meat and vegetable department and an Oriental department with cheap, imported goods from Japan and China.

Rival retailers resented Whiteley's encroachment on their territory and in 1876, they staged an angry charivari (public shaming ritual) by demonstrating in the streets and burning a "Guy" dressed in the traditional costume of a draper.

Claiming that he could provide anything from a pin to an elephant, William Whiteley dubbed himself "The Universal Provider". In 1899 the business became a public limited company, with Whiteley as the majority shareholder. Whiteley also procured a second-hand coffin and a pint of fleas. When asked about the fleas after the fact, he said "I don't say the fleas were in stock, but they were procured".

== Murder ==
On 24 January 1907, Whiteley was shot dead at his shop by Horace George Rayner, aged 29, who claimed that he was Whiteley's illegitimate son, and that his real name was Cecil Whiteley. Decades before his successes, Horace's father, George Rayner, was a very close friend of Whiteley and the two of them were acquainted with two sisters from Brighton and would visit them together. Their relationship with the young ladies resulted in a quarrel and the friendship of George Rayner and Whiteley abruptly ended. Whiteley's attorneys claimed that the person Cecil Whiteley had never existed and were unsure of a motive behind the confrontation. However, upon Rayner's arrest a package of documents was procured, potentially evidence of Rayner's claim. Rayner attempted suicide and left a note which read "To All Whom It May Concern -- William Whiteley is my father, and has brought upon himself and me a double fatality by reason of his own refusal of a request perfectly reasonable -- R.I.P." In his will Whiteley left £1 million (a fabulous amount at that time, equivalent in 2018 to £103 million). Some of the money was used to create Whiteley Village, a retirement village near Walton-on-Thames.

Following his death, Whiteley's two sons carried on operating the business and opened a new shop in 1912. This was eventually sold to Harry Gordon Selfridge in 1927.

== See also ==
- Department store
- List of department stores by country
- List of department stores of the United Kingdom
- Retail
