= Queen's Road Station, Bayswater =

Painting by Walter Sickert

- Artist: Walter Sickert
- Year: 1916
- Type: Oil on canvas, genre painting
- Dimensions: 62.3 cm × 73 cm (24.5 in × 29 in)
- Location: Courtauld Gallery, London

Queen's Road Station, Bayswater is an oil painting on canvas by the German-born British artist Walter Sickert, from 1916.

== History and description ==
It depicts a man sitting on a platform of what was then known as Queen's Road Station on the London Underground, serving the Bayswater area. Above his head is an advert for the nearby Whiteleys department store. Whiteley’s at the time was often remembered by the murder of its founder, in 1907. At the time the station was the nearest to Sickert's home off Westbourne Grove.

Sickert was a key member of the Camden Town Group who were strongly influenced by the European Post-Impressionism trend. The work was bought by the painter and art critic Roger Fry in 1919 who bequeathed it to the nation in 1935. It now forms part of the collection of the Courtauld Gallery, in London.

== Bibliography ==
- Behr, Shulamith. The 20th Century at the Courtauld Institute Gallery. Courtauld Institute of Art, 2002.
- Corbett, David Peters. The World in Paint: Modern Art and Visuality in England, 1848-1914 Pennsylvania State University Press, 2004.
- Green, Christopher. Art Made Modern Roger Fry's Vision of Art. Merrell Holberton, 1999.
