= William Whiteley Limited =

British company

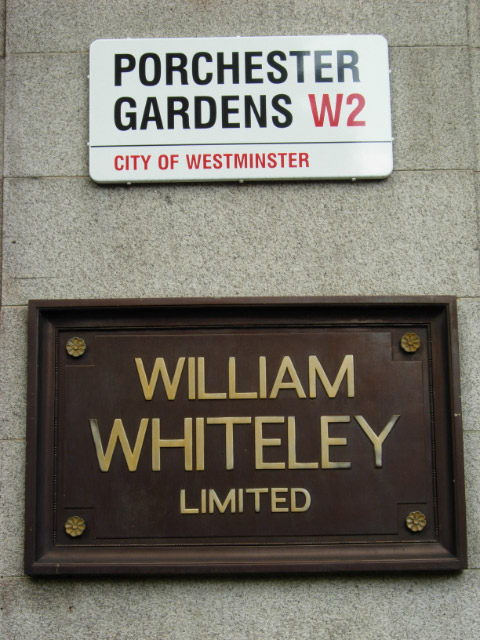
- Type: Private
- Industry: Retail
- Genre: Department Store
- Founded: 1863; 163 years ago
- Founder: William Whiteley
- Defunct: 1981; 45 years ago
- Headquarters: Bayswater, United Kingdom
- Number of locations: 4
- Key people: William Whiteley
- Parent: United Drapery Stores

William Whiteley Limited was a large British retail company founded by William Whiteley in 1863. The business grew to include a warehouse removals business.

== History ==
=== Location ===
London was expanding rapidly in the 1860s and after considering Islington he turned his attention to Bayswater; the area was rapidly being developed into a high class residential district. He observed the number of fashionable people using Westbourne Grove and decided to open his shop there. He started his business in 1863 by opening a Fancy Goods shop at 31 Westbourne Grove, employing two girls to serve and a boy to run errands. Later one of the girls, Harriet Sarah Hill, became his wife.

=== Original store ===
The original Whiteley's department store was created by William Whiteley, who started a drapery shop at 31 Westbourne Grove in 1863. By 1867 it had expanded to a row of shops containing 17 separate departments.

Dressmaking was started in 1868, and a house agency and refreshment room, the first ventures outside drapery, opened in 1872. By then 622 people were employed on the premises and a further 1,000 outside. Whiteley's started selling food in 1875, and a building and decorating department was added in 1876. This proved to be particularly profitable, as the large stuccoed houses in the area needed regular repainting.

Whiteley's met strong opposition from smaller tradesmen, and also from the local authorities over its grand building plans, and several bad fires in the 1880s may have been caused by opponents. Business nonetheless prospered, aided by a delivery service extending up to 25 miles (40 km), and in 1887 the store was described as 'an immense symposium of the arts and industries of the nation and of the world'.

By 1890 over 6,000 staff were employed in the business, most of them living in company-owned male and female dormitories, having to obey 176 rules and working 7 am to 11 pm, six days a week. Whiteley's also bought massive farmlands and erected food-processing factories to provide produce for the store and for staff catering. In 1896 it earned an unsolicited Royal Warrant from Queen Victoria – an unprecedented achievement.

=== Westbourne Grove Fire and reopening ===
The first store – described as "an immense symposium of the arts and industries of the nation and of the world" – was devastated in an enormous fire in 1887, one of the largest fires in London's history. This was the last of four fires that had devastated the business from 1882. In 1887 disaster struck and the store in Westbourne Grove burnt down. In his autobiography, Drawn From Memory, E. H. Shepard said the fire could be seen from Highgate Hill, and some days later when he and his brother Cyril were allowed to visit Westbourne Grove, that, "The long front of the shop was a sorry sight with part of the wall fallen and the rest blackened."

Whiteley's was to rise again like the Phoenix from the fire and was soon rebuilt, but later moved from Westbourne Grove to Queensway. When the Lord Mayor of London in the presence of thousands opened the new store in Queensway on 21 November 1911, it was claimed to be the largest shop in the world.

=== Relocation ===
Queen's Road Station, Bayswater by Walter Sickert, 1916. This view of the London Underground during the First World War features an advert for the Bayswater department store

In 1907, William Whiteley was murdered by Horace George Rayner, who claimed to be his illegitimate son, "Cecil Whiteley". After his death, the board including two of Whiteley's sons allowed the leases on the various Westbourne Grove properties to lapse and moved into a new purpose built store on Queens Road (now called Queensway).

In the 1950s the chairman Sir Sydney Harold Gillet announced that the store was too big for its turnover and converted the upper floors of the store into office space. These were used by Leo computers Ltd. in the 1950s and later by International Computers Limited (ICL) for offices and training facilities in the 1970s. The offices were named "Hartree House" after Douglas Rayner Hartree in recognition of his part in the LEO Computers story. Esso Petroleum also rented some of the office space.

=== Purchase by United Drapery Stores ===
In 1961 United Drapery Stores purchased Whiteleys for a fee of £1,750,000. In the late 1970s UDS held a market survey to find out if the losses of the business were down to customer satisfaction. The survey came back positive: it proved that Whiteleys did not have enough customers.

=== Closure ===
The department store closed down in 1981 remaining empty until the building was purchased by a firm called the Whiteleys Partnership in 1986.

== Football club ==
The store operated an association football club in the 1870s and 1880s, Kildare, which entered the FA Cup on a number of occasions.

== Operations ==
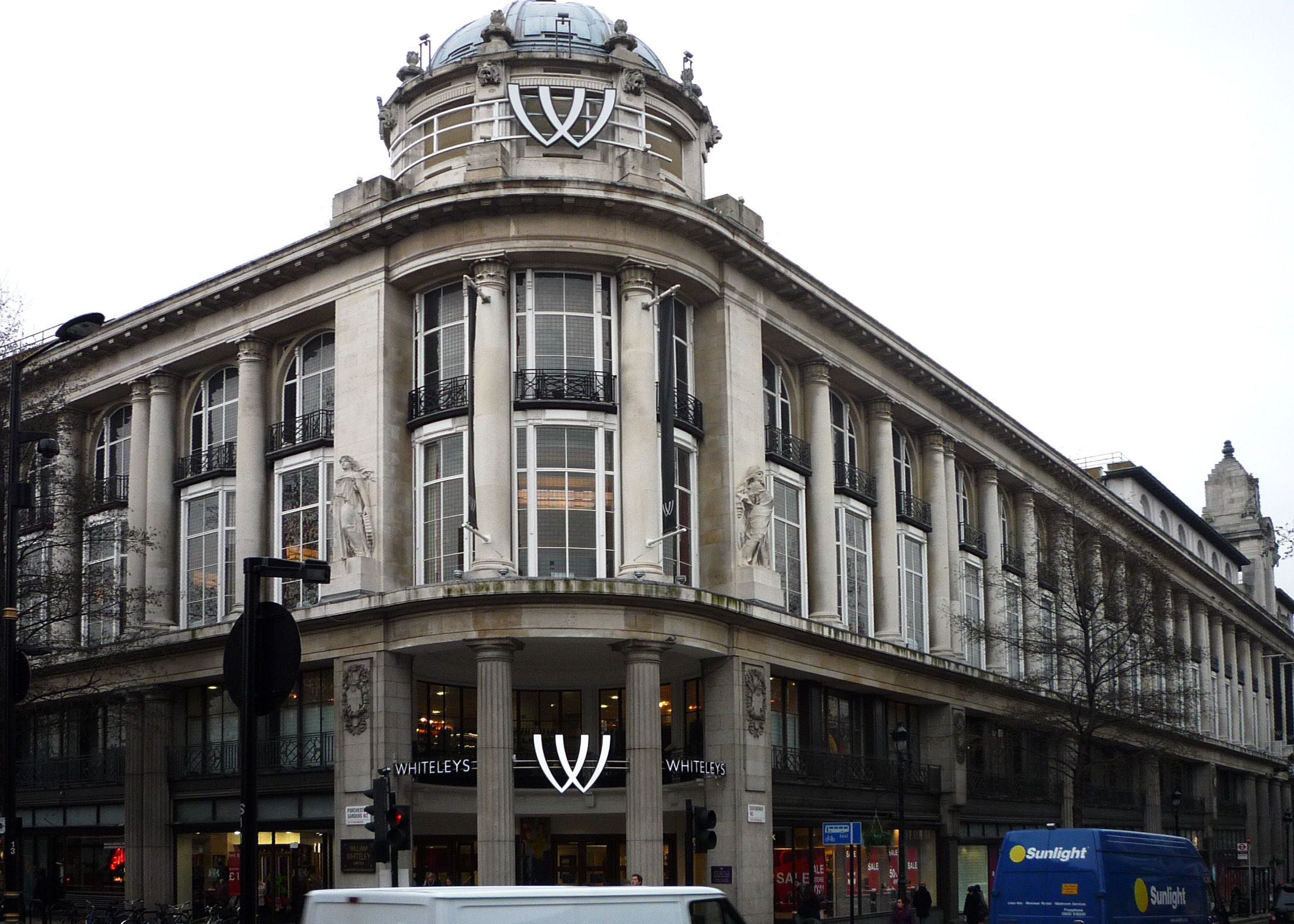
Whiteleys Bayswater

=== Warehouse removals ===
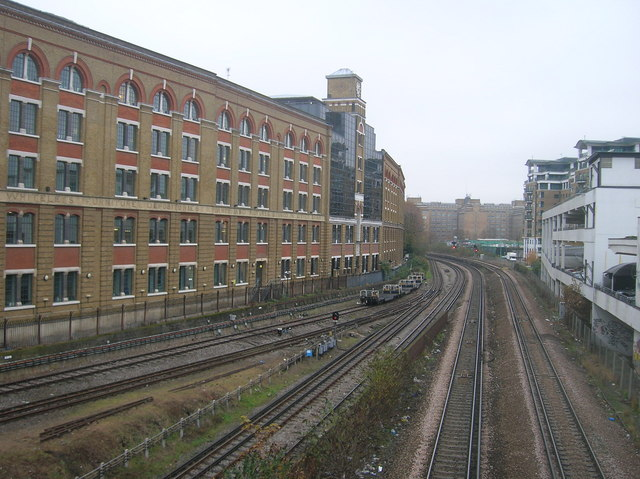
Whiteley's Furniture Depository

William Whiteley Limited also operated a warehouse removals business in Kensington.
