= Banco de Londres y Río de la Plata =

- facade of the Banco de Londres y Río de la Plata (1885)
- Industry: Banking and Financial services
- Founded: 1862
- Defunct: 1923
- Successor: Banco de Londres y América del Sur
- Headquarters: Buenos Aires, Argentina
- Area served: Buenos Aires; Córdoba; Rosario; Montevideo
- Owner: Lloyds Bank (1918-1923)

Banco de Londres y Río de la Plata (English: Bank of London and the River Plate) was a British financial institution, which operated in Buenos Aires from 1862 to 1923.

== History ==
The financial company Banco de Londres, Buenos Ayres y Río de la Plata was formed with English capitals in 1862. Its Board of directors was composed of G. W. Drabble, president, E. R. Duffield, managing director, and C. Hemery, as assistant manager. In Buenos Aires the board was chaired by Robert Thurburn and Thomas Hogg, who remained in their positions until about 1900.

The banking establishment was located on the corner of Piedad and Calle Reconquista, neighborhood of San Nicolás.

This bank came to have branches in Córdoba Province and Rosario, Santa Fe, and also operated in Montevideo, Uruguay. In 1918, the Banco de Londres y Río de la Plata was acquired by Lloyds Bank.
