= Pembridge Square =

Residential square in Central London

Coordinates: 51°30′42″N 0°11′44″W

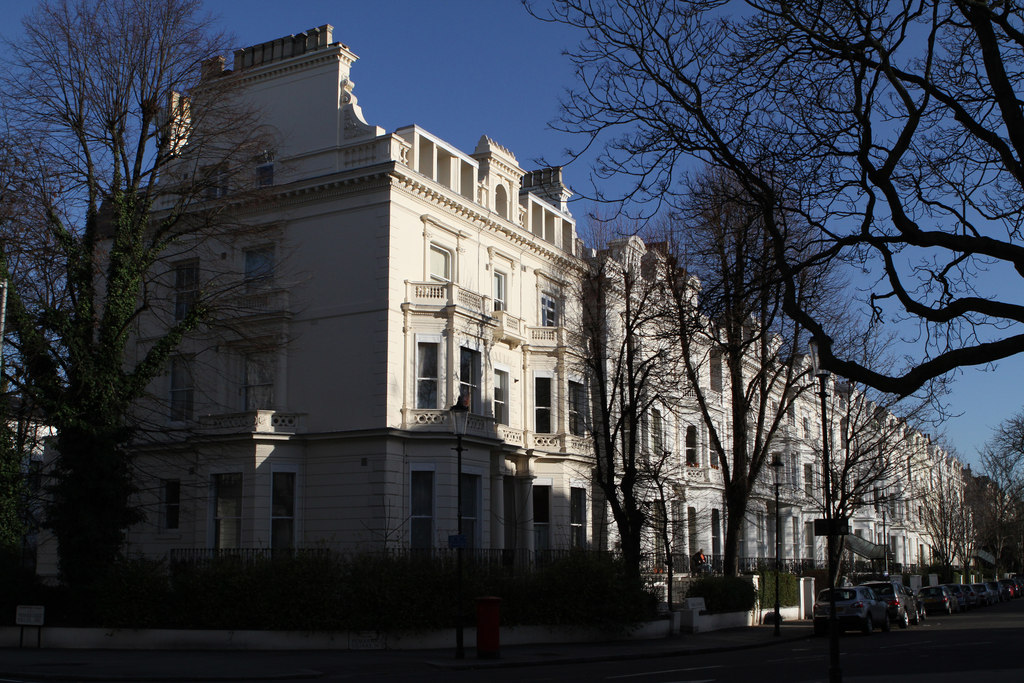
Houses in the square

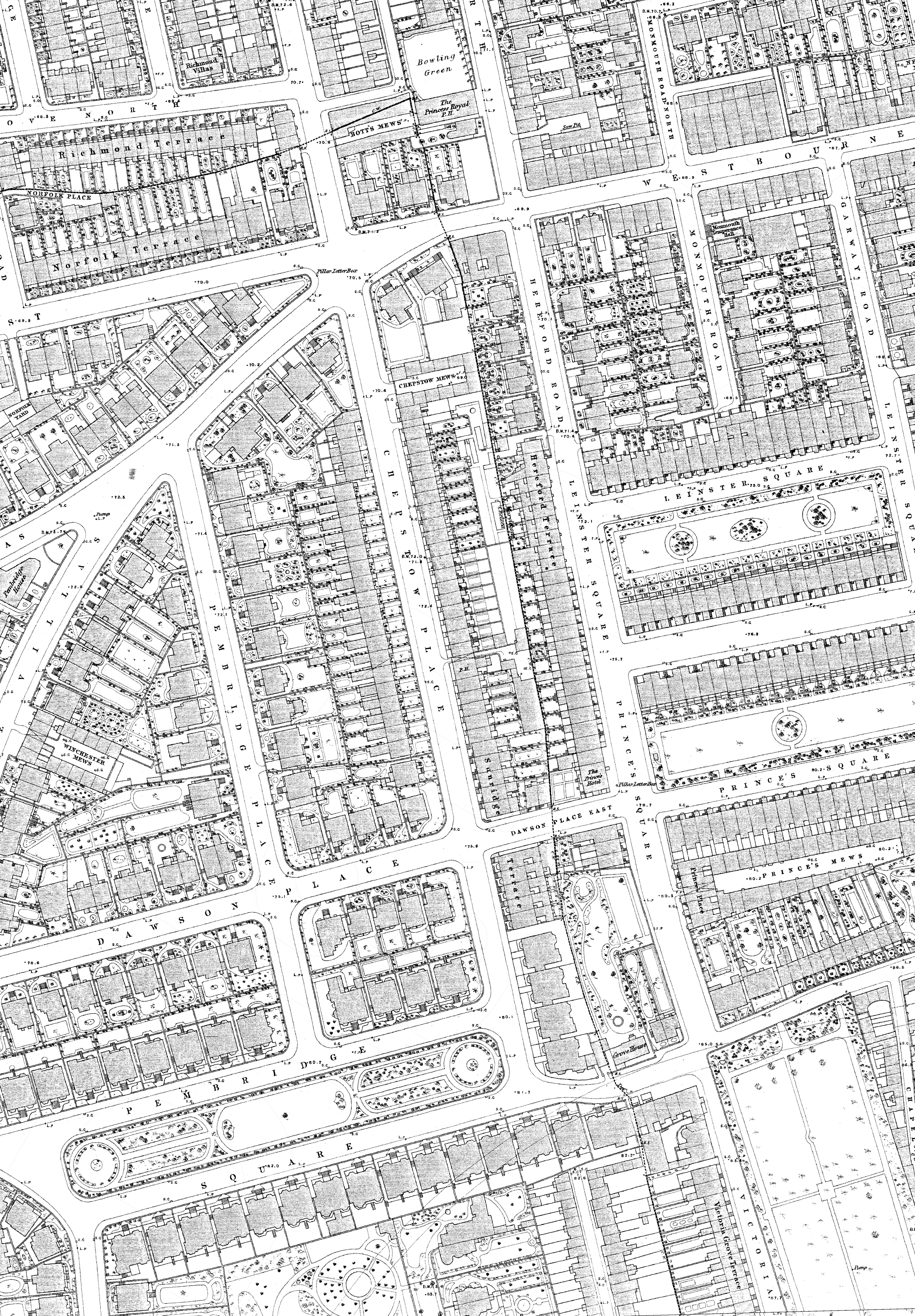
Pembridge Square at the south of an Ordnance Survey map from 1872

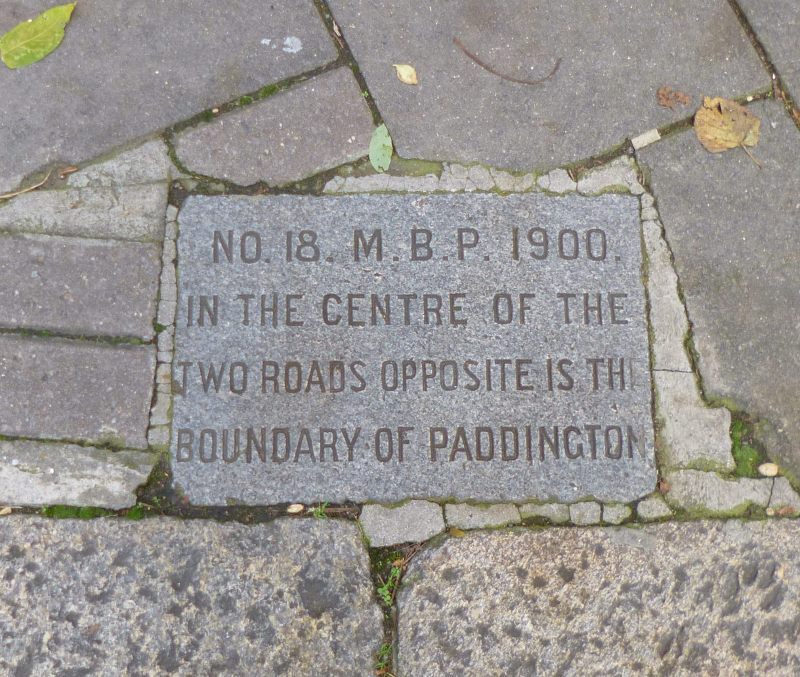
Historic marker of the old boundary of Paddington

Pembridge Square is a residential square in the Bayswater area of London close to nearby Notting Hill. It is located in the Royal Borough of Kensington and Chelsea, just across the border from the City of Westminster to the east. It was laid out during the wider expansion of London into the area during the nineteenth century. Like Pembridge Gardens leading off it the south, it was constructed by the landowner Robert Hall and the builders Francis and William Radford and features stucco frontages. It was built between 1858 and 1864. Several buildings in the square are Grade II listed. It joins Moscow Road to the east, while Chepstow Place heads north from it to meet with Westbourne Grove.

== Bibliography ==
- Cruickshank, Dan. Cruickshank's London: A Portrait of a City in 13 Walks. Random House, 2019.
- Nicholson, Louise. Fodor-London Companion. Fodor's Travel Publications, 1990.
