= Chepstow Place =

Street in London

Coordinates: 51.513389°N 0.194525°W

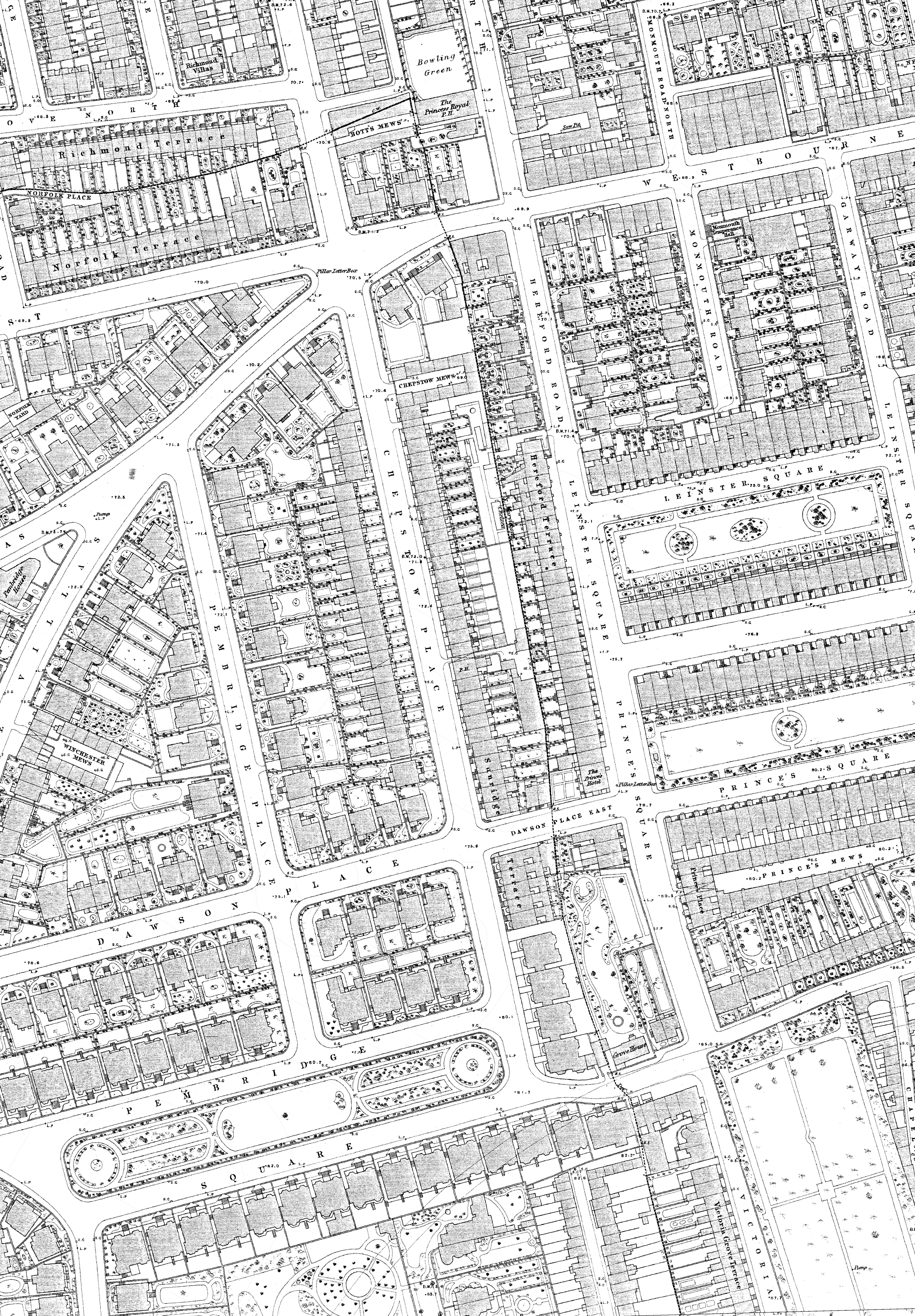
Chepstow Place (centre vertically) on an 1872 Ordnance Survey map.

Chepstow Place is a street in London that runs from the junction of Westbourne Grove and Pembridge Villas in the north to Pembridge Square in the south. It is crossed by Dawson Place and joined on its eastern side by Rede Place. The east side is in the City of Westminster and the west side in the Royal Borough of Kensington and Chelsea.

== History ==
The street was one of those in the area developed in the mid-nineteenth century by William Henry Jenkins, originally of Herefordshire, and William Kinnaird Jenkins, who leased land on the Ladbroke Estate from 1844. The origins of the Jenkins is reflected in the many Hereford and Welsh names used in local streets such as Chepstow and the nearby Pembridge, Ledbury and Denbigh.

== Buildings ==
- The street was once the location of Bradleys furriers at number one. The site is now Baynards.
- 16 Chepstow Place, was the last address of the writer Julian Maclaren-Ross (1912–64) and the address of Bartholomew Malthus, a character in Robert Louis Stevenson's story The Suicide Club.
- The Italian restaurant Assaggi is located at number 39.
- Number 55 was the location for the famous image of the titular characters sitting on its steps for 'Withnail and I'.
- Numbers 61-69 are grade II listed with Historic England.
- Numbers 21 to 23 Pembridge Square, on the corner with Chepstow Place, are all grade II listed.
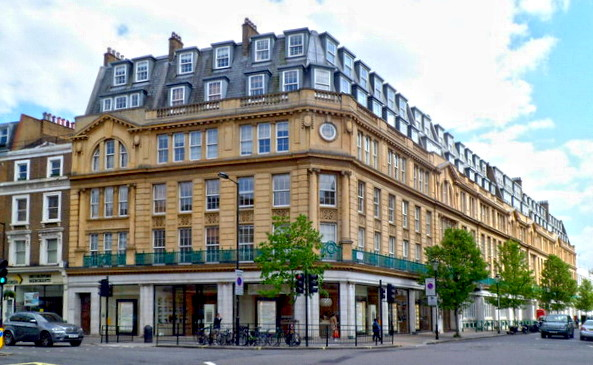
Baynards at 1 Chepstow Place, formerly Bradleys.

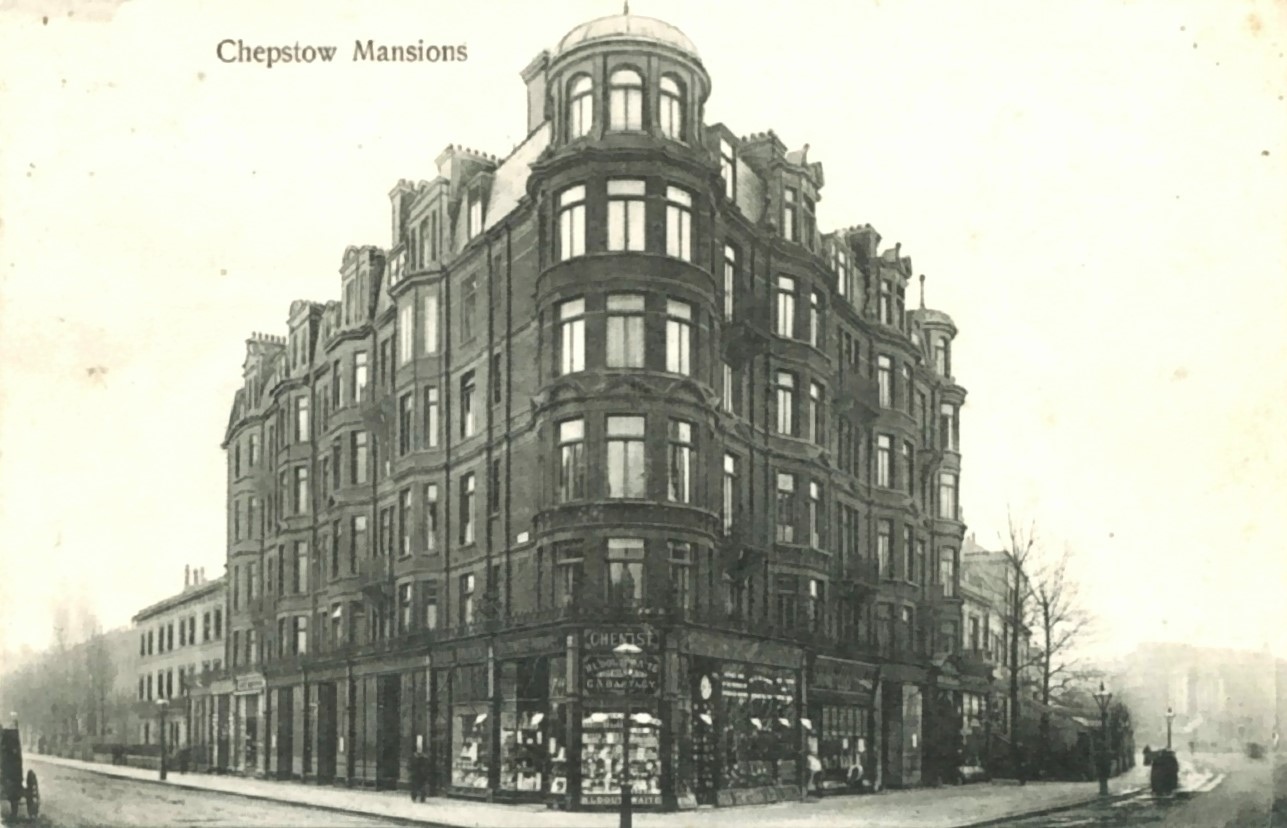
Chepstow Mansions on the corner with Pembridge Villas (right)
