= Mason's Arms, Battersea =

Pub in Battersea, London

Coordinates: 51.476687°N 0.146868°W

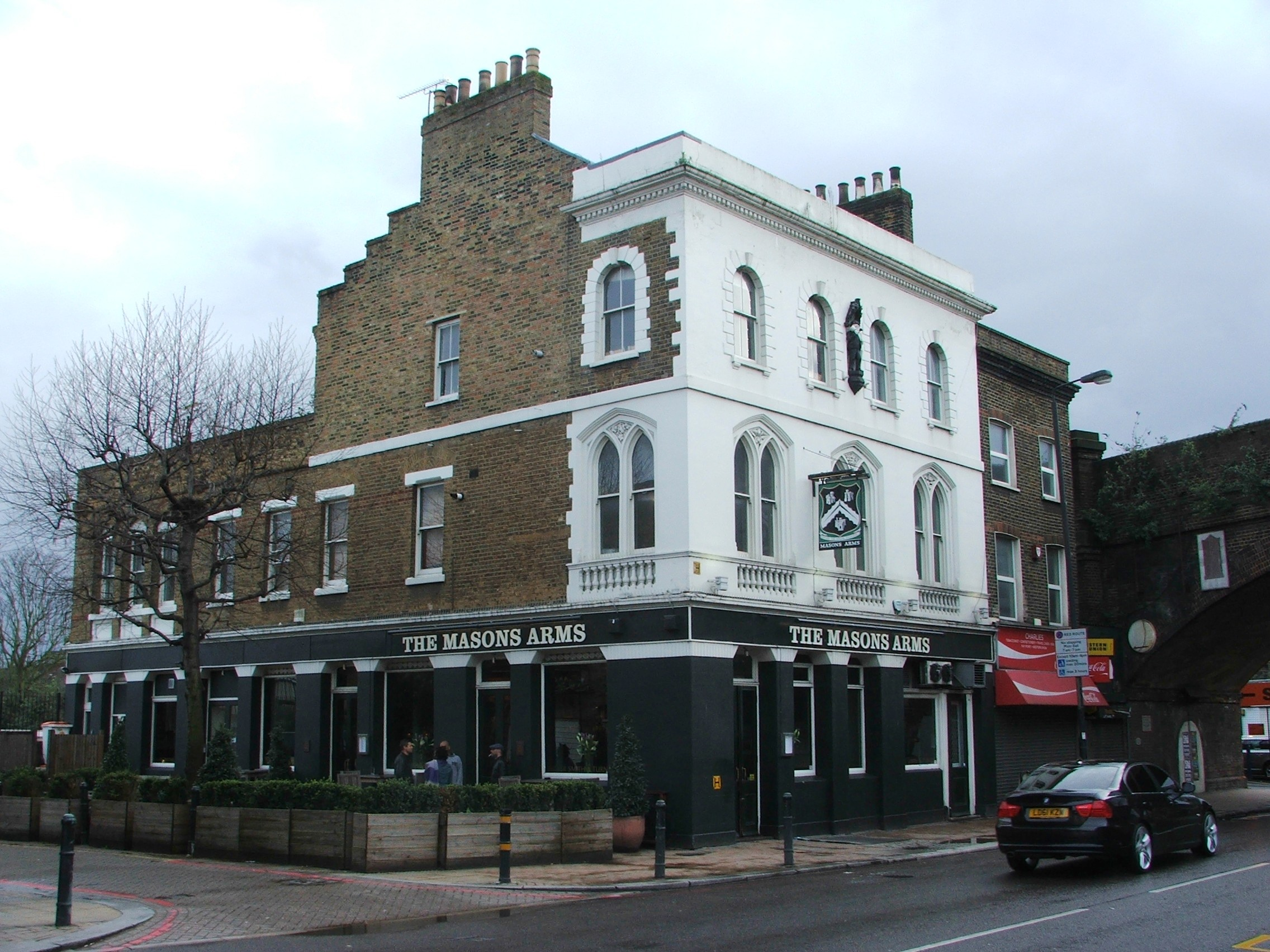
The Mason's Arms, Battersea, London

The Mason's Arms is a pub on Battersea Park Road, Battersea, London SW8, situated opposite Battersea Park Railway Station.

It is a Grade II listed building, built in the mid-19th century. In October 2019 it reopened following a major refurbishment.
