= Thomas Balguy =

English churchman

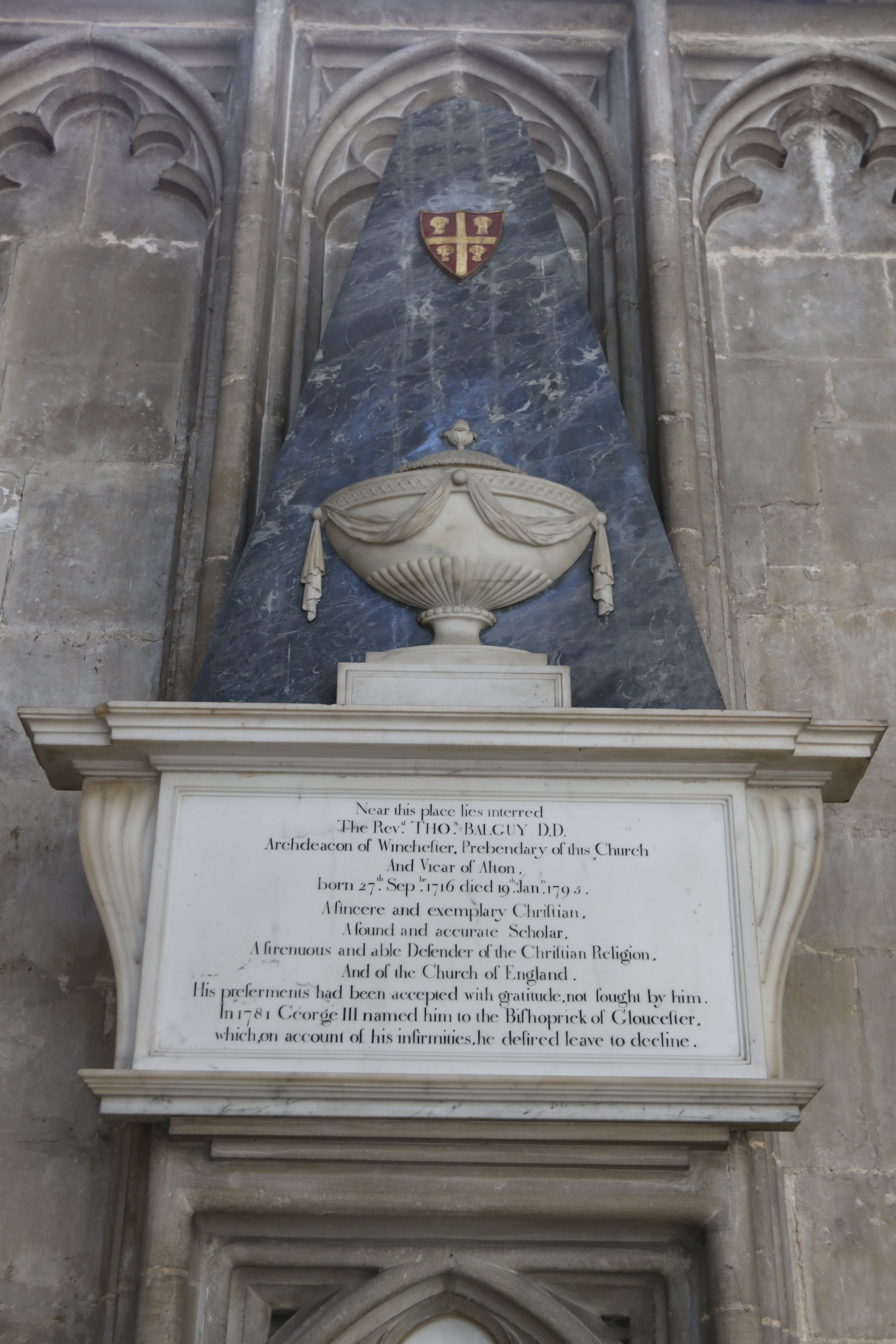
Memorial in Winchester Cathedral

Thomas Balguy (1716–1795) was an English churchman, archdeacon of Salisbury from 1759 and then Archdeacon of Winchester.

== Life ==
He was the son of John Balguy, and was born at Cox-Close 27 September 1716, educated at the Ripon Free School, and admitted to St John's College, Cambridge in 1734; was B.A. 1737, M.A. 1741, S.T.P. 1758. He was elected to a Platt fellowship at St. John's in March 1741, which he held till 1748.

In 1744 he became assistant tutor to his friend William Samuel Powell, tutor and later master of the college, and gave lectures on moral philosophy and the evidences 'for sixteen years.' In 1743 he was deputy public orator, and in 1758 tutor to the Duke of Northumberland. He states in his father's Life that he owed all his preferments to Benjamin Hoadley, who had given his father a prebend of Salisbury. His father, as prebendary, presented him (1748) to the rectory of North Stoke, near Grantham in Lincolnshire, which he vacated in 1771 on becoming vicar of Alton, Hampshire. Through Hoadley's influence he obtained a prebend of Winchester in 1758, and became archdeacon of Salisbury in 1759, and afterwards Archdeacon of Winchester.

Balguy was one of the admirers and disciples of William Warburton, and his name frequently appears in Warburton's correspondence with Richard Hurd. On Warburton's death in 1781 he declined the appointment to the vacant bishopric of Gloucester on the ground of failing health and approaching blindness, and died 19 January 1795 at his prebendal house at Winchester. A monument to him is in the south aisle of Winchester Cathedral.

== Works ==
Thomas, less of a latitudinarian than his father, and opposed the agitation for a relaxation of the 39 Articles. In 1769 he published a sermon on the consecration of Bishop Shipley, which was answered by Joseph Priestley in Observations upon Church Authority. In 1772 he published an archidiaconal charge, in which he defended subscription to articles of religion; and in 1775 a sermon at the consecration of Bishops Hurd and Moore, which was answered in remarks 'by one of the prebendary clergy'. In 1775 he edited the sermons of his friend William Samuel Powell, with a Life of the author; and in 1782 Divine Benevolence asserted, part of an unfinished treatise on natural religion. In 1785 he republished his father's essay on Redemption, and a collection of sermons and charges. His discourses, edited by Rev. James Drake (a relation to whom his manuscripts were bequeathed), were republished at Cambridge in 1820.
