= Charles Daubuz =

Church of England clergyman and theologian

Charles Daubuz or Charles Daubus (1673–1717), was a Church of England clergyman and theologian.

Daubuz was a French Protestant divine, who became vicar of Brotherton. In his youth, he removed to England on the revocation of the Edict of Nantes (1685). He was the author of a few theological works, most notably of A Perpetual Commentary on the Revelation of St. John (1720), which is much esteemed. He died on 14 June 1717.

Daubuz was born in the Province of Guienne in France. His only surviving parent, Julia Daubuz, who was Reformed, was driven from her native country in 1686 by relentless persecution that preceded the revocation of the edict of Nantes. She and her family found asylum in England where they were free to exercise their religion.

Daubuz was admitted a Sizer of Queen’s College, in the University of Cambridge on 10 January 1689. In 1693, he obtained his first degree in Arts, on 13 January, then was appointed librarian of his college, that same year, on 21 March.

In 1696, Daubuz succeeded Thomas Balguy, as headmaster of the Grammar-school of Sheffield. Charles Daubuz was the early tutor of John Balguy.

In 1699, Daubuz was presented by the dean and chapter of York to the Vicarage of Brotherton, a small village near Ferrybridge, in the West Riding of Yorkshire. His yearly salary as vicar was that of sixty or seventy pounds. The same year, he received his Master of Arts degree on 2 July.

Daubuz died on 14 June 1717. His remains were interred in the churchyard of Brotherton, at the east end of the church, headed by a marble slab erected in his memory. Eight children survived him, the eldest being almost fourteen years old. Daubuz possessed three gold coins from Louis XIV that were found in the wall of his vicarage house.

== Theological works ==
Daubuz held the traditional historicist view of The Apocalypse in which the events of Revelation partially correspond to historical events that occurred during the lifetime of the author of Revelation to the age of Constantine.

Some of his works include:

- A Symbolical Dictionary of the Prophetic Symbols (Copy 1842)
- A Perpetual Commentary on the Revelation of St. John (1720)
- Pro Testimonio Flavii Josephi de Jesu Christo, Vol. I & II (1706)
