= John Balguy =

English divine and philosopher (1686-1748)

- Born: 12 August 1686; Sheffield, Yorkshire, England
- Died: 21 September 1748 (aged 62); Harrogate, Yorkshire, England
- Occupations: Philosopher and divine
- Children: Thomas

John Balguy (12 August 1686 – 21 September 1748) was an English divine and philosopher.

== Early years ==
He was born at Sheffield and educated at the Sheffield Grammar School (where his father Thomas Balguy was headmaster until his death in 1696) and at St John's College, Cambridge, graduated BA in 1706, was ordained in 1710, and in 1711 obtained the small living of Lamesley and Tanfield in Durham. He married in 1715. It was the year in which Bishop Hoadley preached the famous sermon on 'The Kingdom of Christ', which gave rise to the Bangorian controversy; and Balguy, under the nom de plume of Silvius, began his career of authorship by taking the side of Hoadley in this controversy against some of his High Church opponents.

== Life in the Church ==
In 1726 he published A letter to a Deist concerning the Beauty and Excellency of Moral Virtue, and the Support and Improvement which it receives from the Christian Religion, chiefly designed to show that, while a love of virtue for its own sake is the highest principle of morality, religious rewards and punishments are most valuable, and in some cases absolutely indispensable, as sanctions of conduct. In 1727 he was made a prebendary of Salisbury by his friend Hoadley. In the same year he published the first part of a tractate entitled The Foundation of Moral Goodness, and in the following year a second part, Illustrating and enforcing the Principles contained in the former. The aim of the work is twofold — to refute the theory of Hutcheson regarding the basis of rectitude and to establish the theory of Cudworth and Clarke that virtue is conformity to reason — the acting according to fitnesses which arise out of the eternal and immutable relations of agents to objects.

In 1729 he became vicar of Northallerton, in the county of York. His next work was an essay on Divine Rectitude: or, a Brief Inquiry concerning the Moral Perfections of the Deity, particularly in respect of Creation and Providence. It is an attempt to show that the same moral principle that ought to direct human life may be perceived to underlie the works and ways of God: goodness in the Deity not being a mere disposition to benevolence but a regard to an order, beauty and harmony, which are not merely relative to our faculties and capacities but real and absolute; claiming for their own sakes the reverence of all intelligent beings and alone answering to the perfection of the divine ideas. Balguy wrote several other terse and readable tracts of the same nature, which he collected and published in a single volume in 1734.

== Later life ==
In 1741 he published an Essay on Redemption, containing somewhat advanced views. Redemption as taught in Scripture means, according to him, "the deliverance or release of mankind from the power and punishment of sin, by the meritorious sufferings of Jesus Christ," but involves no translation of guilt, substitution of persons or vicarious punishment. Freed from these ideas, which have arisen from interpreting literally expressions which are properly figurative, the doctrine, he argues, satisfies deep and urgent human wants, and is in perfect consistence and agreement with reason and rectitude. His last publication was a volume of sermons, pervaded by good sense and good feeling, and clear, natural and direct in style. He died at Harrogate. A second volume of sermons appeared in 1750 (3rd ed. in 2 vols., 1760).

Thomas Balguy (1716–1785), who became archdeacon of Winchester, was his son.

== See also ==
- Charles Daubuz, an early tutor of John Balguy
