= Masons Arms, Kensal Green =

London pub

Coordinates: 51°31′48″N 0°13′35″W

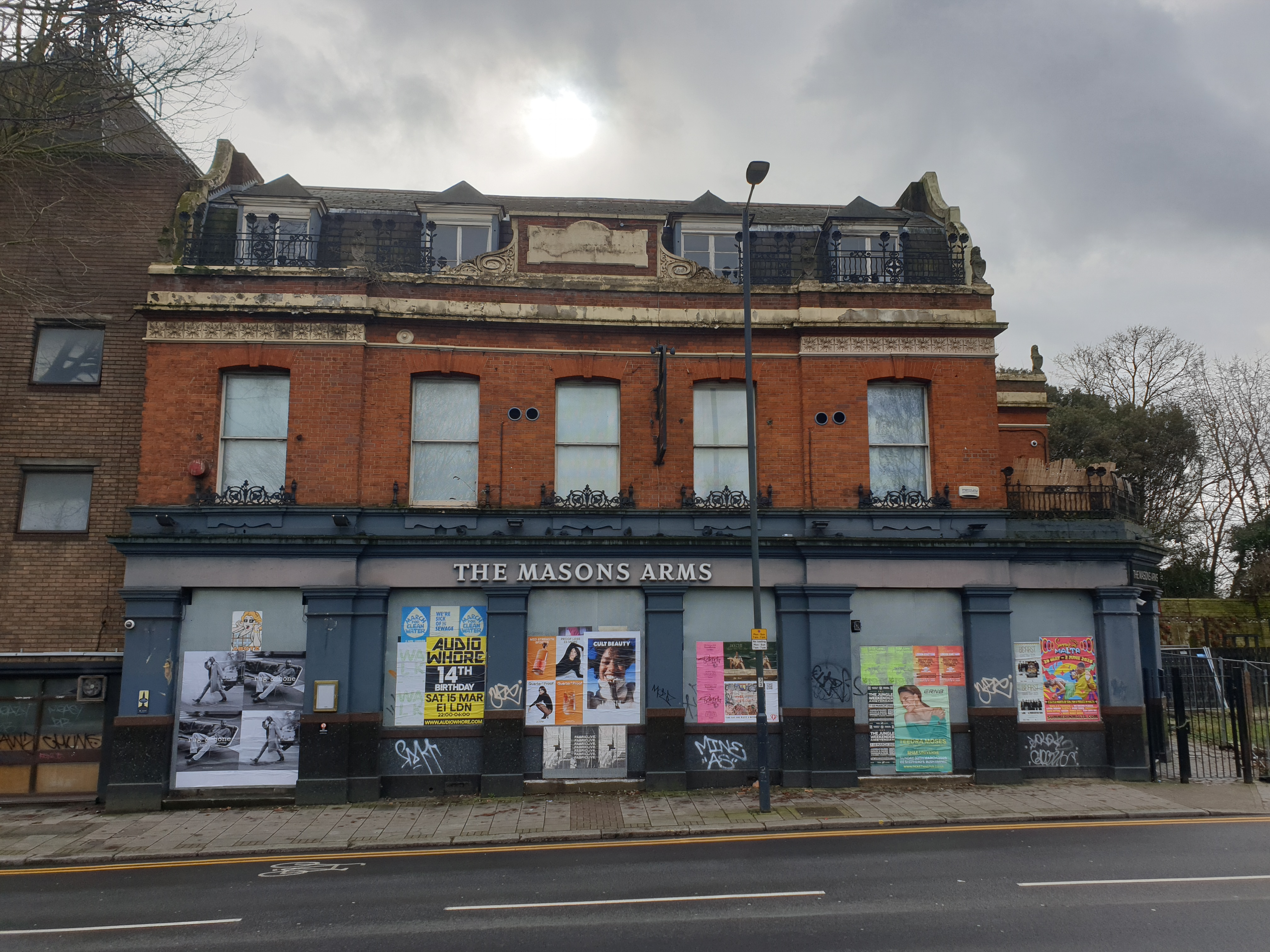
Masons Arms in February 2025

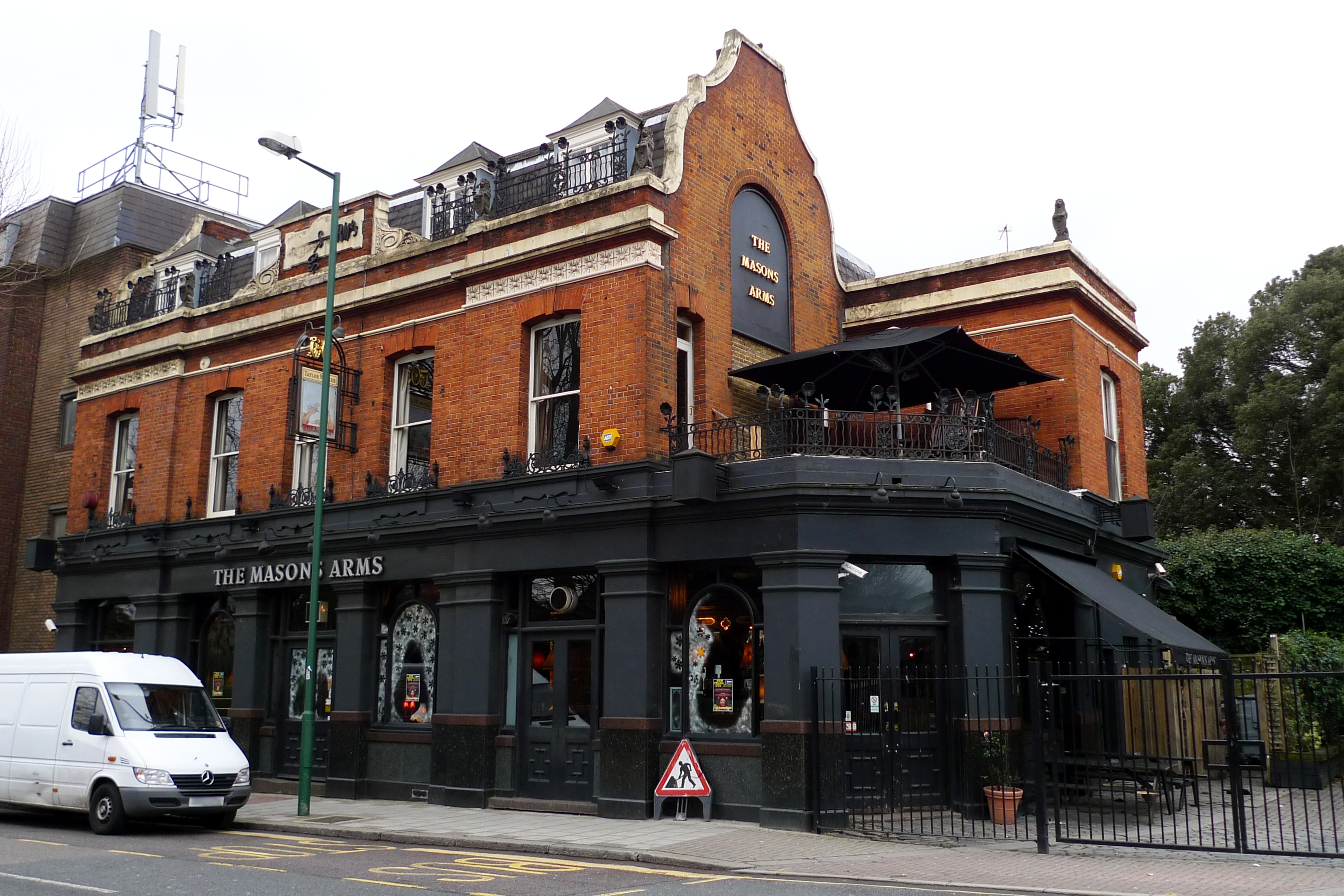
Masons Arms in 2009

The Masons Arms is a late Victorian pub at 665 Harrow Road in Kensal Green, London NW10, overlooking Kensal Green Cemetery.

It was built in 1870 and named for the monumental masons who made gravestones for the neighbouring cemetery.

In May 2024 it was unexpectedly closed by its then owner, Greene King, and put up for sale shortly afterwards, selling in August 2025 for £2.3 million. Plans have been submitted to demolish the pub and replace it with a six-storey block of 26 flats.

The Masons Arms is included in CAMRA's national inventory, for having "an interior of special historic interest". CAMRA have launched a petition to save pub and its historic interior from demolition.
