= De La Vergne =

Defunct American motor vehicle manufacturer

De La Vergne advertisement (1895)

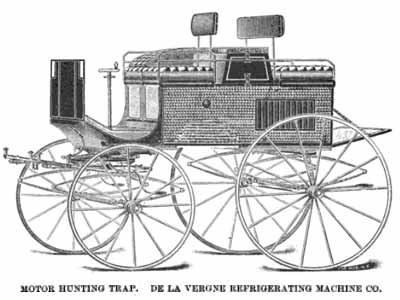
1895 De La Vergne 4-pass Hunting Drag

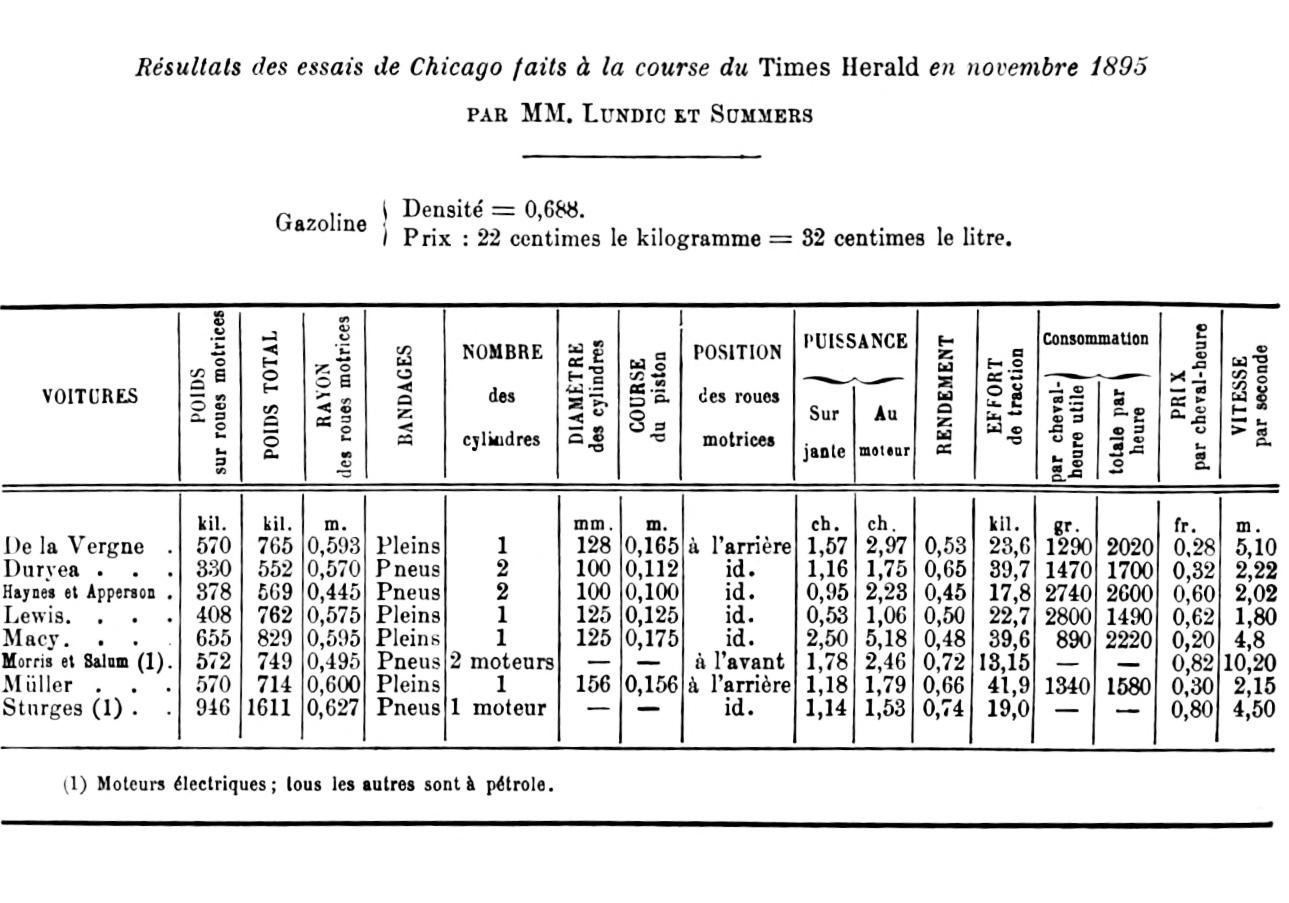
De La Vergne specifications (1895)

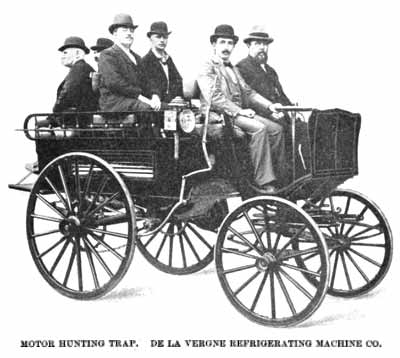
1895 De La Vergne 6-pass Hunting Trap

The De La Vergne was an American automobile manufactured between 1895 and 1896 by John Chester De La Vergne. De La Vergne was a brewer who was manufacturing refrigerators, when he commissioned several vehicles to be built by the Hincks & Johnson Company of Bridgeport, Connecticut and the Valentine, Linn & Son Company of Brooklyn. At least four were made, with the cars being sold to rich and prominent citizens in New York. De La Vergne's death in May 1896 put an end to the venture.
