= Westbourne Grove =

Road in Notting Hill, London

Coordinates: 51°30′54.2″N 0°11′42.3″W

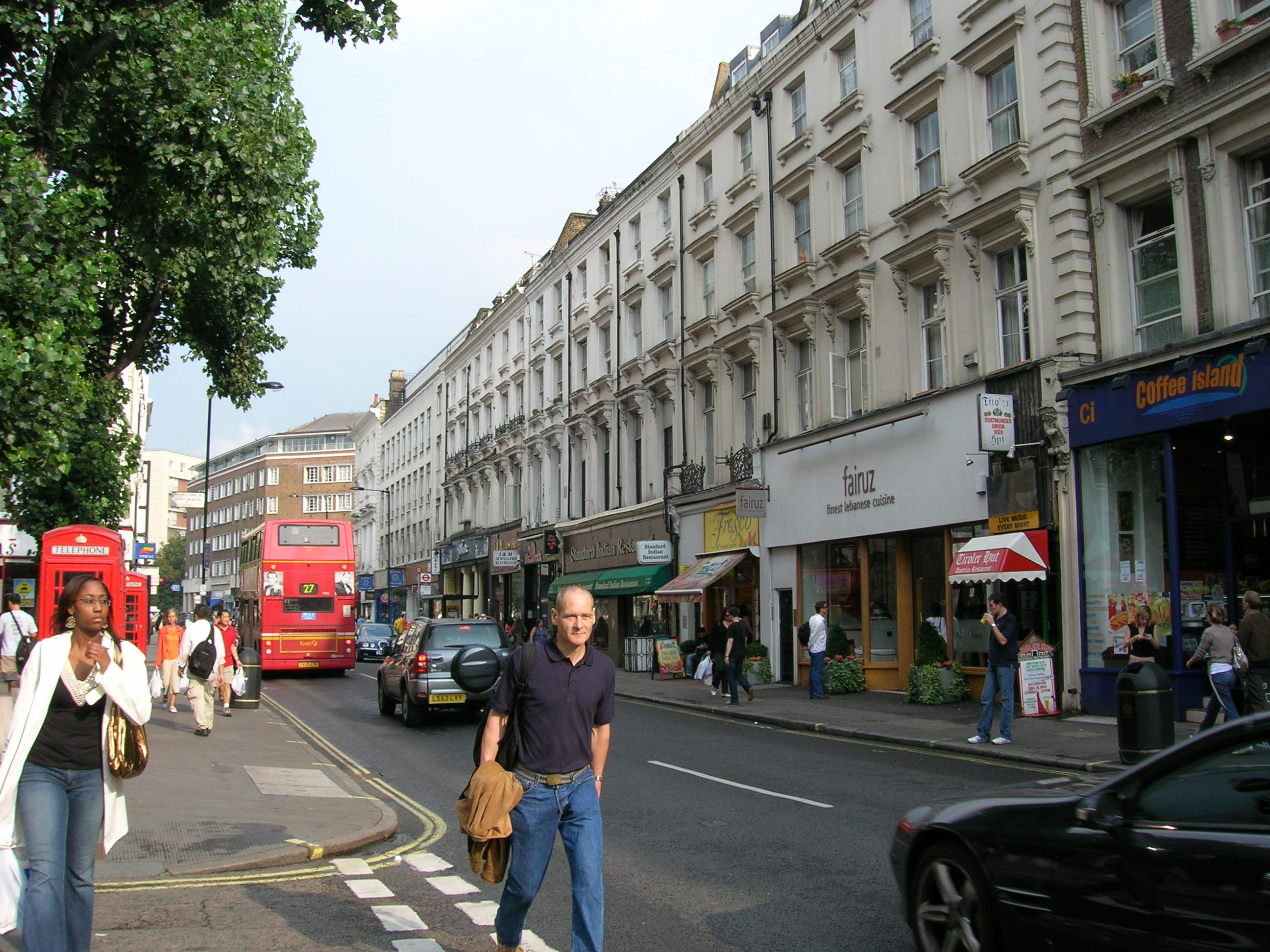
Westbourne Grove

Westbourne Grove is a retail road running across Notting Hill, an area of west London. Its western end is in the Royal Borough of Kensington and Chelsea and its eastern end is in the City of Westminster; it runs from Kensington Park Road in the west to Queensway in the east, crossing over Portobello Road. It contains a mixture of independent and chain retailers, and has been termed both "fashionable" and "up-and-coming".

The Notting Hill Carnival passes along the central part of Westbourne Grove.

== Shopping ==
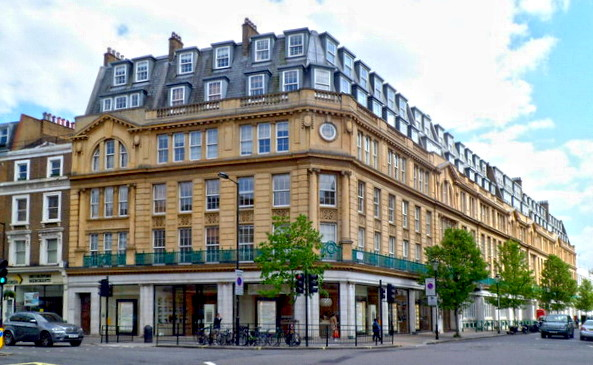
Baynards on the corner with Chepstow Place, formerly Bradleys.

There are a number of popular shopping destinations located on Westbourne Grove and adjoining streets, pre-eminently: Portobello Market, Queensway and Ledbury Road.

On 9 August 1997, authoritative weekly newsagent-magazine Time Out featured West London, selecting Westbourne Grove as the half-city's representative: "Seeking a key shopping road symbolic of western aspirations, we decided that preposterously fashionable Westbourne Grove, or 'Westbourne Village', has it all. It was here that Madonna headed during breaks in filming "Evita" - to the funky boutiques, the avant-garde florists, the designer jewellery and futuristic furniture (at millennial prices)."

In February 2004, the London Plan was first issued and, paired with Queensway, designated Westbourne Grove as one of Greater London's major centres.

Around 2007, the road's eastern Bayswater-end, underwent a rapid period of transformation, east of Chepstow Road. Upon lease expiry, rents increased significantly and pricing-out many incumbent family businesses, which were replaced by fashionable / prestige restaurants and shops.

== History ==
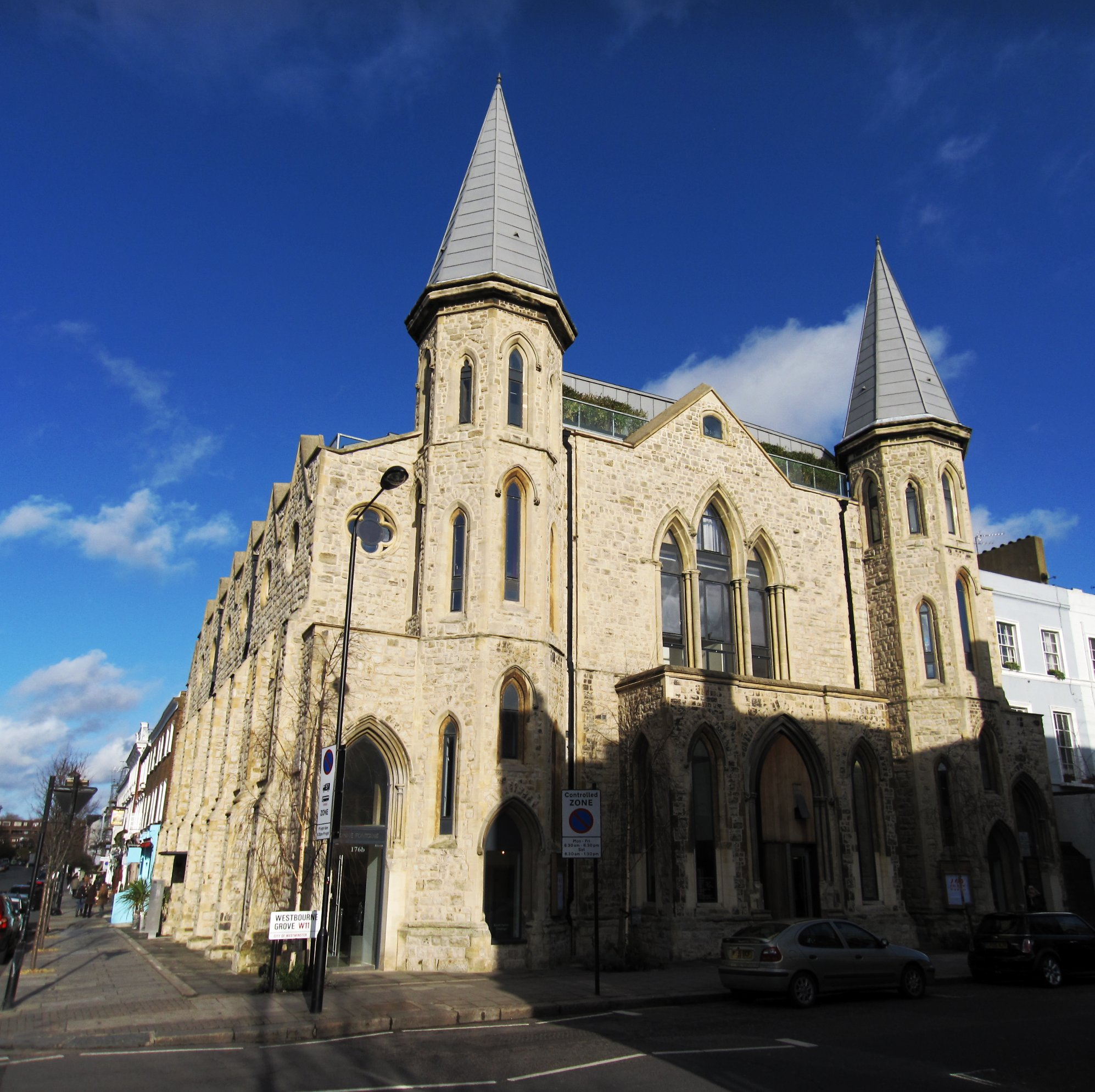
Westbourne Grove Church (2009)

The development of Westbourne Grove began in the 1840s and proceeded from the east (which lay in Bayswater) to the west, where it became the principal east–west artery into the Ladbroke Estate. The far western end of the street only became known as Westbourne Grove relatively recently in 1938, having previously been called Archer Street. In 1926, the novelist A.J. Cronin opened his own medical practice at 152 Westbourne Grove.

Westbourne Grove takes its name from Westbourne Green – a settlement that developed to the west of the bourne that later took the name River Westbourne. This river currently runs underground at Ossington Street. The area is first recorded in 1222 as Westeburn. Westbourne Green is first recorded as Westborne Grene in 1548. Westbourne Green formed part of the parish of Paddington.

There was a small settlement to the north of what is now Westbourne Grove at Westbourne Green. It had five main houses. The largest of these was Westbourne Place or Westbourne House, which was rebuilt in 1745 by the architect Isaac Ware as an elegant Georgian mansion of three storeys with a frontage of nine windows divided into three parts. The central third was topped by a large pediment and contained the main door, which also had a pediment over it. The lower two storeys were formed into bays at each end, which contained three windows each. Amongst the well-known residents of this house were Sir William Yorke, baronet; the Venetian ambassador; the architect Samuel Pepys Cockerell (a great great nephew of the diarist Samuel Pepys); and the General Commander in Chief of the Army, Viscount Hill, who left in 1836 (and who gave his name to the modern road bridge north of Westbourne Grove called Lord Hill's Bridge). The house was demolished in 1836 to make way for the houses and gardens of what is now Westbourne Park Villas. Thomas Hardy lived in this area, mainly at no 16 Westbourne Park Villas, which was his home 1863–67.

Also north of what is now Westbourne Grove was Westbourne Farm which was the home, between 1815 and 1817, of the actress Sarah Siddons, who lived there with her daughter. The Farm was at the point where the Harrow Road, the Westway and the canal converge. Mrs Siddons was buried at St Mary's Church, the main church of Paddington, on Paddington Green, where her grave can still be seen.

Though now popular and expensive for home-buyers, much of the area had become run-down in the 1950s, when it was the centre of the activities of notorious slum landlord Peter Rachman, after whom the phrase "Rachmanism" was coined. He was known for his violent evictions of tenants with legally fixed rents. He replaced them—in what had become overcrowded multi-occupied housing—mainly with recent migrants from the West Indies who, because of discrimination and council tenant restrictions, could not find accommodation. He operated from an office in Westbourne Grove. Part of the area, including streets between Ledbury Rd & Shrewsbury Road to the south of Westbourne Park Road, became derelict and was consequently compulsorily purchased and demolished.

Notting Hill Post Office, in Westbourne Grove, finally closed in a storm of controversy during early 2005. However, the Royal Mail retained its sorting office on the site.

John Lanchester, in The Guardian (6 January 2012), observed Westbourne Grove to be "an area that in the last couple of decades has gone from slightly rough to full-on trustafarian to total bankerisation."
