= Harben =

Harben is a surname, and may refer to:

- David Harban, graphic artist and printmaker
- Henry Harben (insurer) (1823–1911), British insurance company manager
- Henry Devenish Harben (1874–1967), English barrister and politician; father of cricketer Henry Harben
- Henry Eric Southey Harben (1900–1971), English cricketer; son of Henry Devenish Harben
- Hubert Harben (1878–1941), English film actor; father of Philip Harben
- Philip Harben (1906–1970), English chef; son of Hubert Harben
- William Harben (1858–1919), U.S. novelist and screenwriter
