= Henry Harben =

Henry Harben may refer to:

- Henry Eric Southey Harben (1900–1971), English cricketer
- Sir Henry Harben (insurer) (1823–1911), British pioneer of industrial life assurance
- Henry Andrade Harben (1849–1910), barrister, insurance company director, politician, and historian of London
- Henry Devenish Harben (1874–1967), British barrister and politician
