= Henry Oberlander =

British fraudster

Henry Oberlander (born c. 1927) was the leader of the Hungarian Circle, a gang that defrauded international banks of hundreds of millions of pounds. Following a global investigation, the gang were arrested in 1978 at their headquarters in West London, England. During the trial, the prosecution asserted that the gang "could have wrecked the entire banking system of the Western World". The scam, possibly operating over a twenty-year period, was dubbed at the time as "the greatest fraud in banking history".

The Hungarian Circle's success was due in part to the banks' own unwillingness to admit the crimes. The police were never able to trace much of the money stolen. Oberlander served only three years in prison for his crimes before settling in America.

Due to the nature of the postwar era and the ease of border crossing, it was hard for police, journalists and historians to check or verify the stories of Oberlander and his gang. The Circle members took many aliases, nationalities, passports and backstories and were fleeing dozens of convictions in absentia across the world.

== Gang name ==
An article in the German magazine Stern, coined the name "Hungarian Circle" and flagged Oberlander as the gang leader. The name was a misnomer, however, as only two of the eleven main members were from Hungary. But the catchy soubriquet stuck and was later adopted by Scotland Yard. The two in question had left Hungary following the Soviet occupation.

== Henry Oberlander ==
Gang leader Oberlander, probably of Czech descent, stated that he had been incarcerated in Auschwitz concentration camp and had seen his whole family die. He said he had been ordered to dig mass graves as well as his own grave, at the site, before being wounded in the legs and falling into the grave with the bodies. He told of staying in the mass of corpses until dark and then crawling away to his escape. He claimed that he managed to get to Hungary and then Vienna. He claimed to have helped agents track and capture Nazi Adolf Eichmann through South America and finding Doctor Joseph Mengele on a ranch in Brazil. He said he was hunted by the ex-SS agents of ODESSA. As a notorious conman, the detail of Oberlander's testimony was not given much weight at the time.

At the time of the trial of the Hungarian Circle, in 1978, Oberlander was aged 51, a "portly, balding little man". There was some doubt as to his birth name, however, as he was caught with approximately 30 passports in various names and nationalities. His aliases included Evans, Blum, Orlander, Markowitz and Weisser.

== Gang ==
The Circle included Jewish refugees from Eastern Europe, a Nazi tank commander Carl Albert and premiere English squash player Louis Tufnell. Tufnell had been financial adviser to Lord Camrose, co-owner of The Daily Telegraph, and to The Lord Thomson, owner of The Times. Renowned forger Francisco Fiocca was Argentinian of Italian background, with 11 International standing convictions, given in absentia. Emile Fleischmann had many aliases, including Vogel. He was an old friend of Oberlander and a participant in previous swindles, claiming to have been a French Legionnaire. Andre Biro, living in Hampstead, 52 at the time of the trial, was regarded as the quartermaster of the group. Jorge Grunfeld described himself as an "antiques dealer"and also a "property developer".

Everyone is willing to give something for whatever it is they desire the most.
'Henry's rule'

The group set up a workshop, including a hand operated press, in a three-room, first floor flat at 9 Vere Court, in Westbourne Gardens. Their expertise lay in forging bank drafts, an order drawn from one bank and payable to another. They found that it was simple to imitate an authentic draft; watermarked paper was easy to obtain and the signatures were easy to fake. Tufnell and Albert would then cash the forged drafts, duping both banks into a false transfer. They targeted over 40 banks internationally, spreading the risk, and transferring only limited amounts, less than $20,000 each time.

As the draft system depended on immediate transfer and as the profits from the sale of drafts were high, no complaints of fraud were ever lodged and the banks held their silence. Not one of the banks targeted ever divulged how much they had lost. The police were never able to trace most of the transfers. They stated that the full amount taken was likely to have been hundreds of millions of dollars. At this point, in the 1970s, police systems had not been developed to track financial fraud.

== Capture and conviction ==
On investigation, it was found that the forger Fiocca had made simple errors in his process. Serial numbers were printed in the wrong font, he was sloppy in his faking of signatures and often used the wrong inks. He made an error, forging a passport for the 'Republica Central De Uruguay', which did not exist. It was found that Oberlander had previous criminal history, including convictions for banking forgeries in the Persian Gulf.

A scrap metal merchant in Plaistow was put under observation in his meetings with Oberlander. Also Billy Ambrose, a bookmaker in a gambling establishment in London's Soho, was noted to be spending large amounts freely and was watched by police. It was noticed that he met and dealt regularly with Oberlander, and the police followed the gang leader to the forgery workshop.

In the early morning of 13 August 1976, 250 police detectives, led by the Serious Crime Squad, closed in on the flat and arrested 32 people, including Oberlander, Fiocca and Fleischmann. Police officers describe finding thousands of forged letters of credit, cheques, passports and visas. Among the paperwork, they found 117 forged bankers drafts about to be distributed through the Israel Discount Bank, to the value of £10 million. Police also raided 20 other buildings connected to the circle.

The committal proceedings were conducted at Horseferry Road Magistrates' Court and lasted three months. The trial itself was held at the Old Bailey Crown Court and lasted another three months. All the evidence was then examined again. The defence was funded by legal aid. The cost of police work and preparation for the trial was in excess of £2 million, one of the most expensive prosecutions in British legal history at the time. The frauds themselves left behind a wide trail of debts, bankruptcies and legal costs across many countries. Nine gang members were convicted and the others were released or convicted of other crimes. The investigation covered multiple countries including America, Switzerland, West Germany, Saudi Arabia and Spain. Judge Gerald Hines stated that the swindle was of "immense gravity" comparable with the recent Great Train Robbery and international espionage. The judge condemned Oberlander for hiding the stolen money in places where it could not be traced. It was clear that Oberlander had targeted American banks, scamming £60 million, before switching to Europe in the mid-1970s.

The Observer newspaper described Oberlander in court:

"Oberander [is a] striking figure with a vast stomach, ever battling to escape the stricture of his waistcoat, the lower half of his face obliterated by a wilderness of flowing beard".

Oberlander was fined £50,000 and sentenced to 14 years in prison. The other gang members were given between eight and three-year sentences. The bookmaker, Ambrose, was never charged. Oberlander claimed he had no money to pay the fine. He told a story of keeping multiple passports to hunt down Nazis and smuggle Jews out from behind the Iron Curtain. He was indeed convicted in Rhodesia of defrauding Jewish families with promises of escape routes. He always maintained that his projects were part of larger Mafia networks and that they ultimately received the profits; a claim that was not believed by British police.

I see some of the things that they are trying to do to stop counterfeits, but the newest anti-counterfeiting measures wouldn't be good enough to stop me if I went back to the old business. Nothing would stop me.

Henry Oberlander

In 1981, having served three years of his 14-year sentence, Oberlander, aged 53, was released from Wormwood Scrubs prison, freed on the basis of diabetic poor health. On 20 December, he was deported to America and put on a flight to New York. On leaving Britain, his health immediately improved and he commenced giving interviews on his experience as a conman. British police officers stated that Oberlander was freed early as he managed to convince American authorities that he held valuable information available for trading.

== Reaction ==
The Washington Post described the arrests as "brilliant, fantastic coup" for Scotland Yard. The Yard had recently smashed the Kray gang terrorising East London, and The Richardson Gang in the south; the breaking of the Hungarian Circle was seen as another significant victory against organised crime.

Roy James, who was part of the Great Train Robbery gang, commented that the Hungarian Circle became an international cause célèbre following the trial, like the train robbers themselves. James noted, however, that investors may have committed suicide due to the millions that were stolen.

== Henry's rule ==
Oberlander's motto is today known as 'Henry's rule' of business. "Everyone is willing to give something for whatever it is they desire the most."

== Further resources ==
- Footage of Hungarian Circle trial. British Universities Film and Video Council, News report, 30 May 1978
- Trial records held at the National Archives. 1977 Jan 01 - 1980 Dec 31
