= Paddington South (London County Council constituency) =

London County Council constituency

- Former constituency for the London County Council

Former constituency
- Created: 1889
- Abolished: 1965
- Member(s): 2 (to 1949); 3 (from 1949)

Paddington South was a constituency used for elections to the London County Council between 1889 and the council's abolition, in 1965. The seat shared boundaries with the UK Parliament constituency of the same name.

== Councillors ==
Year	Name	Party	Name	Party	Name	Party
1889	George Fardell	Moderate	George David Harris	Moderate	Two seats until 1949	
1898	Henry Andrade Harben	Conservative	George David Harris	Moderate	Two seats until 1949	
1901	Henry Andrade Harben	Conservative	Henry Percy Harris	Conservative	Two seats until 1949	
1907	Melvill Beachcroft	Municipal Reform	Henry Percy Harris	Conservative	Two seats until 1949	
1910	John Burgess-Preston Karslake	Municipal Reform	Harry Lewis-Barned	Municipal Reform	Two seats until 1949	
1930	John Burgess-Preston Karslake	Municipal Reform	John Temple Scriven	Municipal Reform	Two seats until 1949	
1931	Harold Vaughan Kenyon	Municipal Reform	John Temple Scriven	Municipal Reform	Two seats until 1949	
1936	Harold Vaughan Kenyon	Municipal Reform	Henry Studholme	Municipal Reform	Two seats until 1949	
1945	Harold Vaughan Kenyon	Municipal Reform	Ernest Hyatt	Municipal Reform	Two seats until 1949	
1946	Norris Kenyon	Conservative	Frederick Lawrence	Conservative	Two seats until 1949	
1949	Norris Kenyon	Conservative	Frederick Lawrence	Conservative	Thelma de Chair	Conservative
1955	Norris Kenyon	Conservative	Frederick Lawrence	Conservative	Edward Clive Bigham	Conservative
1958	Montagu Lowry-Corry	Conservative	Frederick Lawrence	Conservative	Edward Clive Bigham	Conservative

== Election results ==
1889 London County Council election: Paddington South
Party	Candidate	Votes	%	±%
Moderate	George Fardell	1,631		
Moderate	George David Harris	1,362		
Progressive	Archibald Dobbs	1,283		
Progressive	Mitchell Cox	213		
Progressive	H. L. Mills	186		
Moderate win (new seat)				
Moderate win (new seat)				

1892 London County Council election: Paddington South
Party	Candidate	Votes	%	±%
Moderate	George Fardell	N/A	N/A	
Moderate	George David Harris	N/A	N/A	
Moderate hold		Swing		
Moderate hold		Swing		

1895 London County Council election: Paddington South
Party	Candidate	Votes	%	±%
Moderate	George Fardell	1,964		
Moderate	George David Harris	1,895		
Progressive	T. Bremner	493		
Moderate hold		Swing		
Moderate hold		Swing		

1898 London County Council election: Paddington South
Party	Candidate	Votes	%	±%
Conservative	George Harris	2,190		
Conservative	Henry Andrade Harben	2,146		
Progressive	Charles George Paddon	620		
Progressive	H. C. Biron	614		
Moderate hold		Swing		

1901 London County Council election: Paddington South
Party	Candidate	Votes	%	±%
Conservative	George Harris	1,618	43.1	−1.1
Conservative	Henry Andrade Harben	1,611	42.9	−0.4
Progressive	Charles George Paddon	524	14.0	+1.5
Conservative hold		Swing		
Conservative hold		Swing	-1.5	

1904 London County Council election: Paddington South
Party	Candidate	Votes	%	±%
Conservative	Henry Andrade Harben	2,608		
Conservative	Henry Percy Harris	2,580		
Progressive	J. Kennedy	970		
Progressive	D. Vaughan Owen	937		
Majority				
Conservative hold		Swing		

1907 London County Council election: Paddington South
Party	Candidate	Votes	%	±%
Municipal Reform	Melvill Beachcroft	3,763		
Municipal Reform	Henry Percy Harris	3,709		
Progressive	J. S. Holmes	843		
Progressive	Alfred Young Mayell	816		
Majority				
Municipal Reform hold		Swing		

1910 London County Council election: Paddington South
Party	Candidate	Votes	%	±%
Municipal Reform	John Burgess-Preston Karslake	3,226		
Municipal Reform	Harry Barned Lewis-Barned	3,200		
Progressive	E. E. Hayward	984		
Progressive	Alfred Young Mayell	946		
Majority				
Municipal Reform hold		Swing		

1913 London County Council election: Paddington South
Party	Candidate	Votes	%	±%
Municipal Reform	John Burgess-Preston Karslake	3,353		
Municipal Reform	Harry Barned Lewis-Barned	3,316		
Progressive	Reymond Hervey de Montmorency	817		
Progressive	Alfred Young Mayell	805		
Majority		2,499		
Municipal Reform hold		Swing		
Municipal Reform hold		Swing		

1919 London County Council election: Paddington South
Party	Candidate	Votes	%	±%
Municipal Reform	John Burgess-Preston Karslake	Unopposed	n/a	n/a
Municipal Reform	Harry Lewis-Barned	Unopposed	n/a	n/a
Municipal Reform hold		Swing		
Municipal Reform hold		Swing		

1922 London County Council election: Paddington South
Party	Candidate	Votes	%	±%
Municipal Reform	John Burgess-Preston Karslake	Unopposed	n/a	n/a
Municipal Reform	Harry Lewis-Barned	Unopposed	n/a	n/a
Municipal Reform hold		Swing		
Municipal Reform hold		Swing		

1925 London County Council election: Paddington South
Party	Candidate	Votes	%	±%
Municipal Reform	John Burgess-Preston Karslake	4,759		n/a
Municipal Reform	Harry Lewis-Barned	4,629		n/a
Labour	A. Farrer	1,175		n/a
Labour	Leopold Spero	1,139		n/a
Municipal Reform hold		Swing		
Municipal Reform hold		Swing		

1928 London County Council election: Paddington South
Party	Candidate	Votes	%	±%
Municipal Reform	John Burgess-Preston Karslake	Unopposed	n/a	n/a
Municipal Reform	Harry Lewis-Barned	Unopposed	n/a	n/a
Municipal Reform hold		Swing		
Municipal Reform hold		Swing		

Paddington South by-election, 1930
Party	Candidate	Votes	%	±%
Municipal Reform	John Temple Scriven	Unopposed	n/a	n/a
Municipal Reform hold		Swing		

1931 London County Council election: Paddington South
Party	Candidate	Votes	%	±%
Municipal Reform	Harold Vaughan Kenyon	Unopposed	n/a	n/a
Municipal Reform	John Temple Scriven	Unopposed	n/a	n/a
Municipal Reform hold		Swing		
Municipal Reform hold		Swing		

1934 London County Council election: Paddington South
Party	Candidate	Votes	%	±%
Municipal Reform	Harold Vaughan Kenyon	5,647		n/a
Municipal Reform	John Temple Scriven	5,574		n/a
Labour	J. E. MacColl	2,251		n/a
Labour	G. Hill	2,200		n/a
Municipal Reform hold		Swing		
Municipal Reform hold		Swing		

1937 London County Council election: Paddington South
Party	Candidate	Votes	%	±%
Municipal Reform	Harold Vaughan Kenyon	7,531		
Municipal Reform	Henry Studholme	7,276		
Labour	J. E. MacColl	2,941		
Labour	B. Ash	2,817		
Municipal Reform hold		Swing		
Municipal Reform hold		Swing		

1946 London County Council election: Paddington South
Party	Candidate	Votes	%	±%
Municipal Reform	Norris Kenyon	7,354		
Municipal Reform	Frederick Lawrence	7,317		
Labour	F. Hardie	3,648		
Labour	R. Chinn	3,595		
Conservative hold		Swing		
Conservative hold		Swing		

1949 London County Council election: Paddington South
Party	Candidate	Votes	%	±%
Conservative	Frederick Lawrence	13,093		
Conservative	Norris Kenyon	13,085		
Conservative	Thelma de Chair	13,005		
Labour	Charles Wegg-Prosser	4,581		
Labour	H. Browne	4,284		
Labour	M. Pawley	4,261		
Conservative win (new seat)				
Conservative hold		Swing		
Conservative hold		Swing		

1952 London County Council election: Paddington South
Party	Candidate	Votes	%	±%
Conservative	Norris Kenyon	11,909		
Conservative	Frederick Lawrence	11,857		
Conservative	Thelma de Chair	11,700		
Labour	Charles Wegg-Prosser	5,781		
Labour	A. Dumont	4,619		
Labour	C. L. James	4,583		
Conservative hold		Swing		
Conservative hold		Swing		
Conservative hold		Swing		

1955 London County Council election: Paddington South
Party	Candidate	Votes	%	±%
Conservative	Norris Kenyon	9,857		
Conservative	Frederick Lawrence	9,778		
Conservative	Edward Clive Bigham	9,771		
Labour	A. Dumont	3,446		
Labour	M. Haston	3,425		
Labour	C. Somers	3,337		
Conservative hold		Swing		
Conservative hold		Swing		
Conservative hold		Swing		

1958 London County Council election: Paddington South
Party	Candidate	Votes	%	±%
Conservative	Norris Kenyon	7,579		
Conservative	Frederick Lawrence	7,512		
Conservative	Edward Clive Bigham	7,434		
Labour	J. Alford	4,974		
Labour	William Dow	4,949		
Labour	H. Gray	4,890		
Liberal	P. Bradney	945		
Liberal	S. M. Cowan	926		
Liberal	A. R. P. Ducros	611		
Conservative hold		Swing		
Conservative hold		Swing		
Conservative hold		Swing		

1961 London County Council election: Paddington South
Party	Candidate	Votes	%	±%
Conservative	Frederick Lawrence	8,352		
Conservative	Montagu Lowry-Corry	8,187		
Conservative	Edward Clive Bigham	8,105		
Labour	William Dow	4,413		
Labour	C. Genese	4,324		
Labour	P. Park	4,205		
Conservative hold		Swing		
Conservative hold		Swing		
Conservative hold		Swing		
