= Paddington =

Area of central London, England

Coordinates: 51.5172°N 0.1730°W

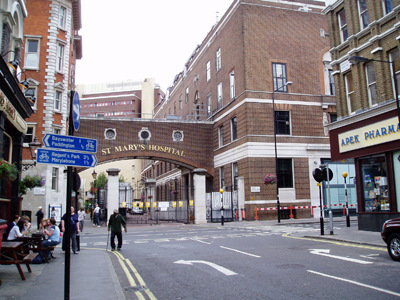
- St Mary's Hospital

- Location within Greater London
- OS grid reference: TQ267814
- London borough: Westminster
- Ceremonial county: Greater London
- Region: London
- Country: England
- Sovereign state: United Kingdom
- Post town: LONDON
- Postcode district: W2, W9
- Dialling code: 020
- Police: Metropolitan
- Fire: London
- Ambulance: London
- UK Parliament: Cities of London and Westminster; Kensington and Bayswater
- London Assembly: West Central

Paddington is an area in the City of Westminster, in central London, England. A medieval parish then a metropolitan borough of the County of London, it was integrated with Westminster and Greater London in 1965. Paddington station, designed by the engineer Isambard Kingdom Brunel, and opened in 1847. It is also the site of St Mary's Hospital and the former Paddington Green Police Station.

Paddington Waterside aims to regenerate former railway and canal land. Districts within Paddington are Maida Vale, Westbourne and Bayswater including Lancaster Gate.

== History ==
A map showing the wards of Paddington Metropolitan Borough as they appeared in 1916.

The earliest extant references to Padington (or "Padintun", as in the Saxon Chartularies, 959), historically a part of Middlesex, appear in the documentation of purported tenth-century land grants to the monks of Westminster by Edgar the Peaceful as confirmed by Archbishop Dunstan. However, the documents' provenance is much later and likely to have been forged after the 1066 Norman Conquest. There is no mention of the place (or Westbourne or Knightsbridge) in the Domesday Book of 1086.

It has been reasonably speculated that a Saxon settlement led by the followers of Padda, an Anglo-Saxon chieftain, was located around the intersection of the northern and western Roman roads, corresponding with the Edgware Road (Watling Street) and the Harrow and Uxbridge Roads. From the tenth century, Paddington was owned by Westminster Abbey which was later confirmed by the Plantagenet kings in a charter from 1222. This charter mentions a chapel and a farm situated in the area. A 12th-century document cited by the cleric Isaac Maddox (1697–1759) establishes that part of the land was held by brothers "Richard and William de Padinton". They and their descendants carried out activities in Paddington; these were known by records dating from 1168 to 1485. They were the earliest known tenant farmers of the land.

During King Henry VIII's dissolution, the property of Paddington was seized by the crown. However, King Edward VI granted the land to the Bishop of London in 1550. Successive bishops would later lease farmlands to tenants and city merchants. One such, in the 1540s, was Thomas North, who translated Plutarch's Parallel Lives into English in 1579. Shakespeare would later use this work and was said to have performed in taverns along Edgware Road.

In the later Elizabethan and early Stuart era, the rectory, manor and associated estate houses were occupied by the Small (or Smale) family. Nicholas Small was a clothworker who was sufficiently well connected to have Holbein paint a portrait of his wife, Jane Small. Nicholas died in 1565 and his wife married again, to Nicholas Parkinson of Paddington who became master of the Clothworkers' Company. Jane Small continued to live in Paddington after her second husband's death, and her manor house was big enough to have been let to Sir John Popham, the attorney general, in the 1580s. They left the building that became in this time Blowers Inn.

=== Early Modern period ===
As the regional population grew in the 17th century, Paddington's ancient Hundred of Ossulstone was split into divisions; Holborn Division replaced the hundred for most administrative purposes. A church, the predecessor of St Mary was built in Paddington in 1679.

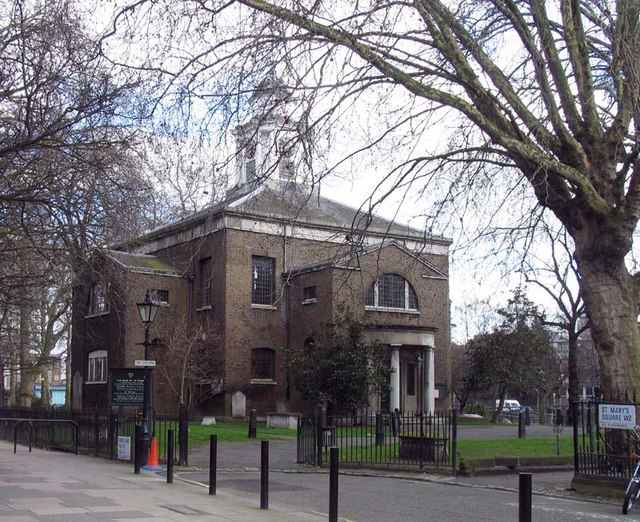
St Mary on Paddington, a Georgian church commissioned in 1788

In 1740, John Frederick leased the estate in Paddington and it is from his granddaughters and their families that many of Paddington's street names are derived. The New Road was built in 1756–7 to link the villages of Paddington and Islington. By 1773, a contemporary historian felt and wrote that "London may now be said to include two cities (London and Westminster), one borough (Southwark) and forty six antient [ancient] villages [among which]... Paddington and [adjoining] Marybone (Marylebone)." During the 18th century, several French Huguenots called Paddington village home. These included jewellers, nobility and skilled craftsmen; and men such as Claudius Amyand (surgeon to King George II). The French nobility built magnificent gardens that lasted up until the 19th century.

Roman roads formed the parish's northeastern and southern boundaries from Marble Arch: Watling Street (later Edgware Road) and; (the) Uxbridge road, known by the 1860s in this neighbourhood as Bayswater Road. They were toll roads in much of the 18th century, before and after the dismantling of the Tyburn gallows "tree" at their junction in 1759, a junction now known as Marble Arch. The Tyburn gallows might have been a reason why expansion and urban development (from London) slowed in Paddington, as public execution was taking place there up until 1783.

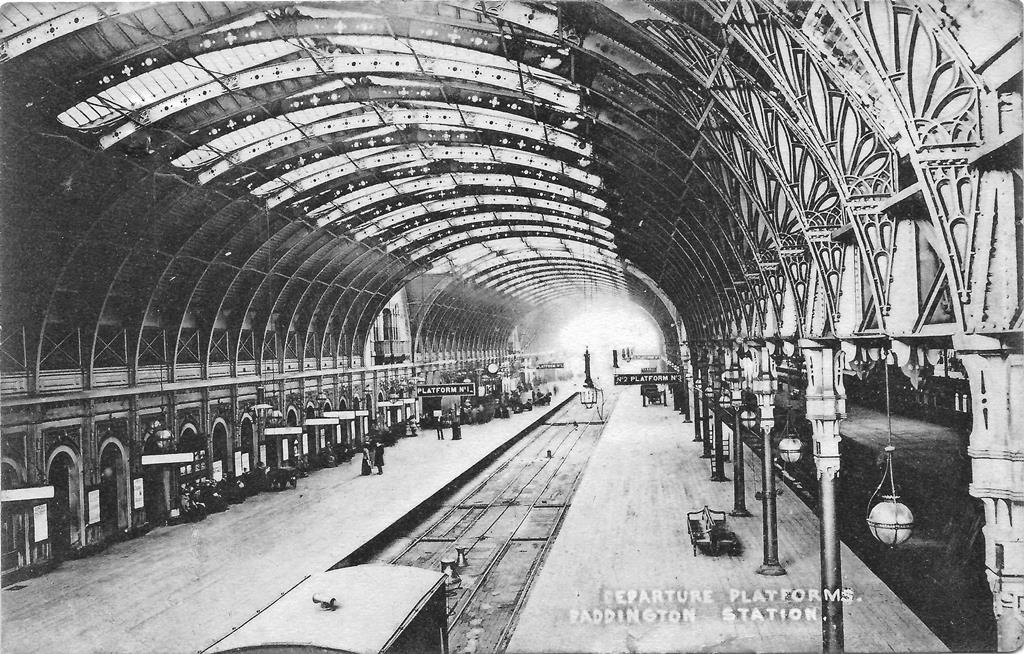
Paddington station first opened in 1838

Only from 1801 did major construction in Paddington occur, stimulated when the bishops leased land to the Grand Junction Canal, which formed a direct trade link between London and the Midlands, bringing more employment to the area, though some of the trade continued along the Regent's Canal when that was opened in 1820. Construction and building projects took place across the parish throughout the 19th century, increasing its population rapidly, overtaking the village scene of Paddington. The population increased from 1,881 to 46,305 between 1801 and 1851, with 10,000 new inhabitants added every decade thereafter.

Paddington station first opened in 1838, with the first underground line in 1863 (Metropolitan). Paddington was one of the few districts in London that had a migrant majority population by 1881., with a thriving Greek and Jewish community present in the mid-19th century. During the period, several Victorian churches were demolished owing to structural decay. Victorian housing developed into slums, giving the area an unsavoury reputation.

In the 1930s massive rebuilding and improvements projects were made. However, even as late as the 1950s Paddington was a byword for overcrowding, poverty and vice. Between the 1960s and 1980s, the area would see vast improvements and redevelopments in city planning.

=== Tyburnia ===
The southeast section of Tyburnia used to be a shanty-town in the 1790s before the canal was built and brought much needed employment to its inhabitants. The area was built up during the course of the Napoleonic Wars.

In the 19th century the part of the parish most sandwiched between Edgware Road and Westbourne Terrace, Gloucester Terrace and Craven Hill, bounded to the south by Bayswater Road, was known as Tyburnia. The district formed the centrepiece of an 1824 masterplan by Samuel Pepys Cockerell to redevelop the Tyburn Estate (historic lands of the Bishop of London) into a residential area to rival Belgravia.

The area was laid out in the mid-1800s when grand squares and cream-stuccoed terraces started to fill the acres between Paddington station and Hyde Park; however, the plans were never realised in full. Despite this, Thackeray described the residential district of Tyburnia as "the elegant, the prosperous, the polite Tyburnia, the most respectable district of the habitable globe."

=== Etymology ===
Derivation of the name is uncertain. Speculative explanations include Padre-ing-tun (explained as "father's meadow village"), Pad-ing-tun ("pack-horse meadow village"), and Pæding-tun ("village of the race of Pæd") the last being the cited suggestion of the Victorian Anglo-Saxon scholar John Mitchell Kemble.

There is another Paddington in Surrey, recorded in the Domesday Book as "Padendene" and later as "Paddingdon", perhaps to be derived from Old English dene, denu "valley", whereas Paddington in Middlesex is commonly traced back to Old English tūn "farm, homestead, town". Both place names share the same first part, a personal name rendered as Pad(d)a, of uncertain origin, giving "Padda's valley" for the place in Surrey and "homestead of Padda's people" for the place in Middlesex. That both place names would refer to the same individual or ancient family, is pure speculation. A lord named Padda is named in the Domesday Book, associated with Brampton, Suffolk.

=== Colloquial expressions ===
An 18th-century dictionary gives "Paddington Fair Day. An execution day, Tyburn being in the parish or neighbourhood of Paddington. To dance the Paddington frisk; to be hanged." Public executions were abolished in England in 1868.

== Geography ==
The Paddington district is centred around Paddington railway station. The conventional recognised boundary of the district is much smaller than the longstanding pre-mid-19th century parish. That parish was virtually equal to the borough abolished in 1965. It is divided from a northern offshoot Maida Vale by the Regent's Canal; its overlap is the artisan and touristic neighbourhood of Little Venice. In the east of the district around Paddington Green it remains divided from Marylebone by Edgware Road (as commonly heard in spoken form, the Edgware Road). In the south west it is bounded by its south and western offshoot Bayswater. A final offshoot, Westbourne, rises to the north west.

== Governance ==
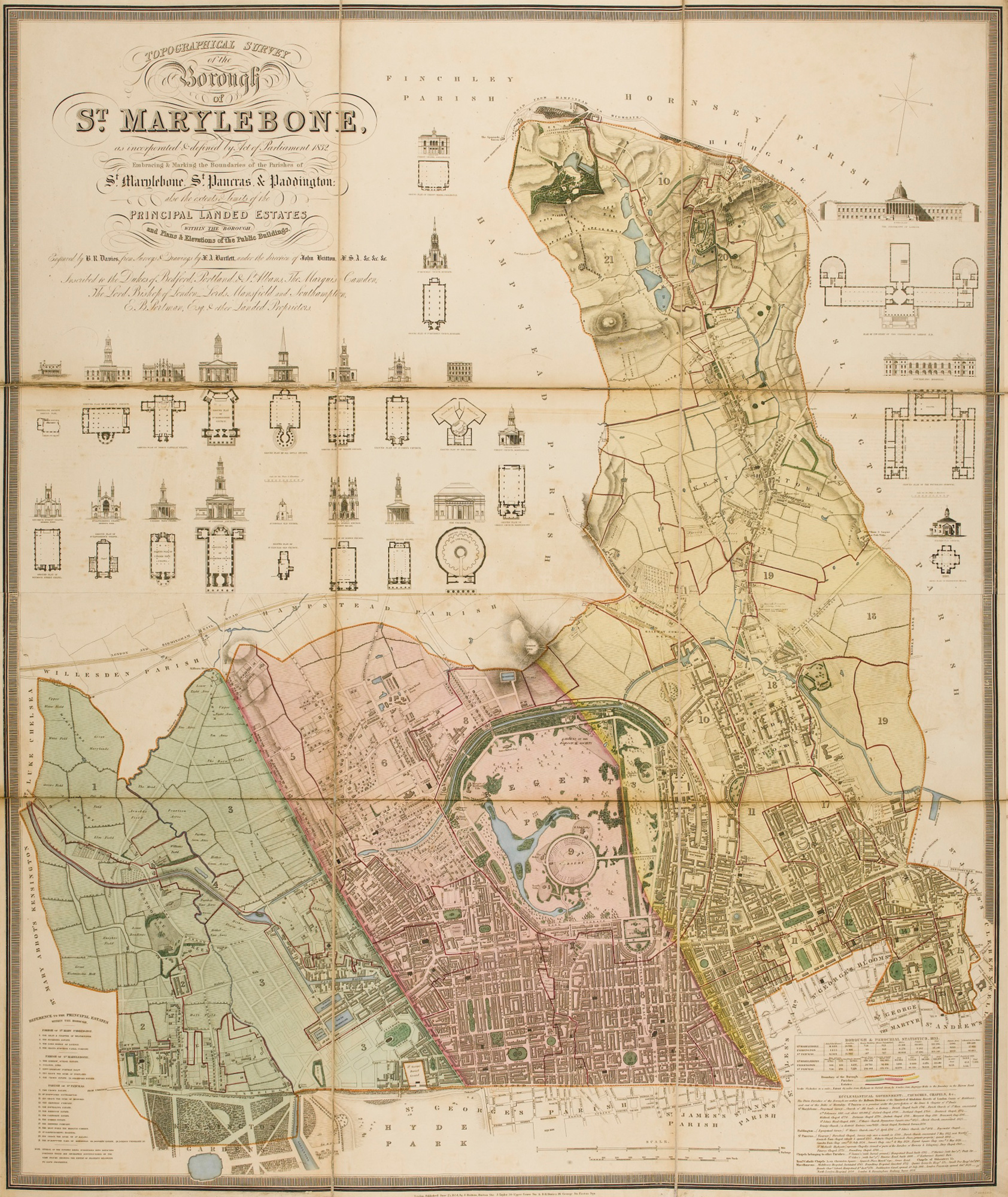
An 1834 map of the Parliamentary Borough of St Marylebone, showing Paddington in (green) and St Pancras (yellow). These Parliamentary Boroughs, like the subsequent Metropolitan Boroughs used the ancient parish boundaries.

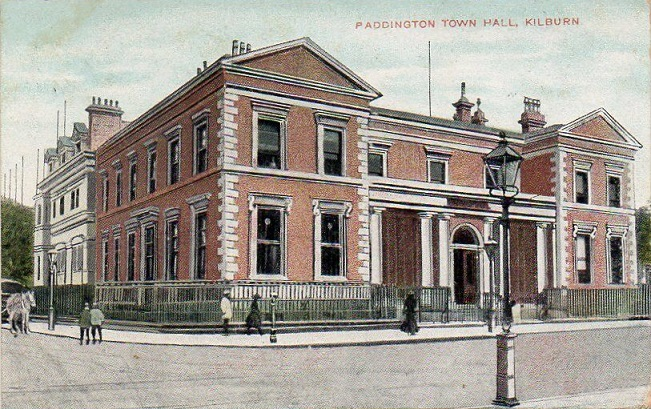
The former Paddington Town Hall

Paddington was part of the Metropolitan Borough of Paddington, the headquarters of which was at Paddington Town Hall, until 1965 when the area became part of the enlarged City of Westminster.

== Landmarks ==
=== Browning's Pool ===
A lagoon created in the 1810s at the convergence of the Paddington Arm of the Grand Union Canal, the Regent's Canal and the Paddington Basin. It is an important focal point of the Little Venice area. It is reputedly named after Robert Browning, the poet. More recently known as the "Little Venice Lagoon" it contains a small islet known as Browning's Island. Although Browning was thought to have coined the name "Little Venice" for this spot there are strong arguments Lord Byron was responsible.

=== London Paddington Station ===
Paddington station is the iconic landmark associated with the area. In the station are statues of its designer, Isambard Kingdom Brunel, and the children's fiction character Paddington Bear.

=== Paddington Basin ===
The terminus of the Paddington Arm of the Grand Union Canal was originally known as the Paddington Basin and all the land to the south was developed into housing and commercial property and titled The Grand Junction Estate. The majority of the housing was bounded by Praed Street, Sussex Gardens, Edgware Road and Norfolk Place. Land and buildings not used for the canal undertaking remained after 1929 with the renamed Grand Junction Company, which functioned as a property company. While retaining its own name, it was taken over in 1972 by the Amalgamated Investment and Property Company, which went into liquidation in 1976. Prior to the liquidation the Welbeck Estate Securities Group acquired the entire estate comprising 525 houses 15 shops and the Royal Exchange public House in Sale Place.

The surrounding area is now known as Merchant Square. A former transshipment facility, the surrounds of the canal basin named Merchant Square have been redeveloped to provide 2,000,000 sq ft (190,000 m^{2}) of offices, homes, shops and leisure facilities. The redeveloped basin has some innovative features including Heatherwicks Rolling Bridge, the Merchant Square Fan Bridge and the Floating Pocket Park.

=== Paddington Central ===
Situated to the north of the railway as it enters Paddington station, and to the south of the Westway flyover and with the canal to the east the former railway goods yard has been developed into a modern complex with wellbeing, leisure, retail and leisure facilities. The public area from the canal to Sheldon Square with the amphitheatre hosts leisure facilities and special events.

=== Paddington Green ===
A green space and conservation area in the east of the Paddington district immediately to the north of the Westway and west of Edgware Road. It includes St Mary on Paddington Green Church. The Paddington Green campus of the City of Westminster College is adjacent to the Green. Paddington Green Police Station is immediately to the north west of the intersection of Westway and Edgware Road.

== Transport ==
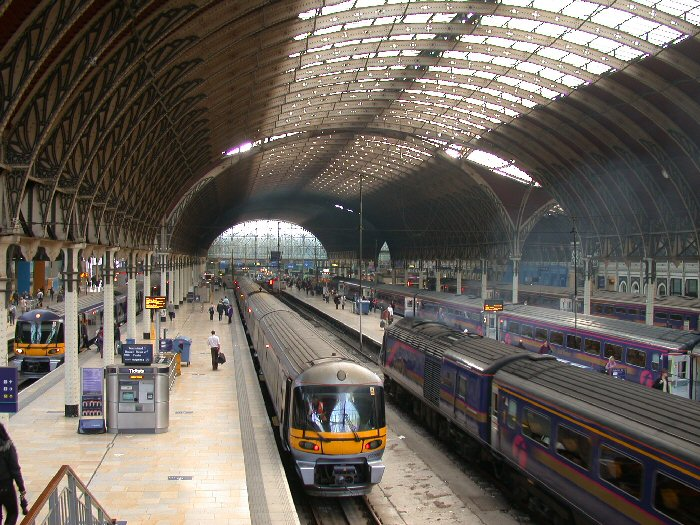
Paddington railway station

=== Rail ===
Paddington station is on the London Underground and National Rail networks. It is in London fare zone 1.

==== National Rail ====
Great Western Railway services from Paddington run towards Slough, Maidenhead and Reading, with intercity services continuing towards destinations in South West England and South Wales, including Oxford, Worcester, Bristol, Cardiff, Exeter, Plymouth and Penzance.

The Elizabeth line, operated by Transport for London (TfL), runs a stopping service from Paddington to Reading, either as part of through-running services from the central and eastern parts of the Elizabeth line or starting from Paddington. These trains mostly depart from the deep-level Elizabeth line platforms underneath the western side of the mainline station. These deep-level Elizabeth line tracks emerge above ground adjacent to the mainline tracks just west of Royal Oak tube station and join them at that point, thereafter sharing the relief line tracks with some Great Western Railway stopping services as far as the Elizabeth line terminus at Reading. Elizabeth line services link the Paddington area both to destinations in west London and Berkshire and to the centre and eastern side of London.

Trains to Heathrow Airport also depart from Paddington, operated both by the Elizabeth line (stopping services via Ealing Broadway) and the Heathrow Express (no intermediate stops).

==== London Underground ====
There are two London Underground (tube) stations in the Paddington station complex.

The Bakerloo, Circle and District lines call at the station on Praed Street (which, from the main concourse, is opposite platform 3). This links Paddington directly to destinations across Central and West London, including Baker Street, Earl's Court, Oxford Circus, South Kensington, Victoria, Waterloo, Westminster and Wimbledon.

The Circle and Hammersmith & City lines call at the station near the Paddington Basin (to the north of platform 12). Trains from this station link the area directly to Hammersmith via Shepherd's Bush to the west. Eastbound trains pass through Baker Street, King's Cross St Pancras, Liverpool Street in the City, Whitechapel and Barking.

Lancaster Gate tube station is also in the area, served by Central line trains.

==== Heritage ====
Paddington station was designed by Isambard Kingdom Brunel. The permanent building opened in 1854.

Paddington Bear was also named after the station; in Michael Bond's 1958 book A Bear Called Paddington, Paddington is found at the station by the Brown family. He is lost, having just arrived in London from "darkest Peru."

=== Buses ===
London Buses 7, 23, 27, 36, 46, 205 and 332, and night buses N7 and N205 serve Paddington station. Buses 23, 27 and 36 operate 24 hours, daily.

Routes 94 and 148 serve Lancaster Gate station to the south of Paddington. Both routes operate 24 hours, daily, supplemented by route N207 at nights.

=== Road ===
Several key routes pass through or around the Paddington area, including:

- A40 (Westway/Marylebone Flyover) – westbound towards White City, Acton and the M40 motorway (towards Oxford and Birmingham).
- A402 (Bayswater Road) – eastbound towards Marble Arch, Oxford Circus and Holborn (via A40/Oxford Street), and Park Lane. Westbound towards Notting Hill, Shepherd's Bush and Chiswick.
- A404 (Harrow Road) – northeast towards Kensal Green, Wembley and Harrow.
- A4205 (Praed Street/Westbourne Terrace)
- A4206 (Bishop's Bridge Road) – southwest towards Notting Hill.
- A4209 (Sussex Gardens)
- A5 (Edgware Road) – southbound to Marble Arch and Park Lane. Northbound to Kilburn, Hendon, the M1 motorway and Edgware. Forms part of the London Inner Ring Road.
- A501 (Marylebone Flyover/Marylebone Road) – eastbound towards Regent's Park, King's Cross and the City. Forms part of the London Inner Ring Road.

=== Cycling ===
Cycling infrastructure is provided in Paddington by Transport for London (TfL) and the Canal & River Trust.

Several cycle routes pass through the area, including:

- Cycleway 3 (C3) – formally known as the "East–West Superhighway," C3 begins just south of Paddington at Lancaster Gate and carries cyclists southbound through Hyde Park to South Kensington. The route continues eastbound, passing Hyde Park Corner, Embankment, Blackfriars, Tower Hill and Canary Wharf en route to Barking in the East End. The route runs predominantly on traffic-free cycle track. The route is also unbroken and signposted.
- Cycleway 27 (C27) – runs on traffic-free paths or residential streets. Westbound, the route runs unbroken and signposted to Bayswater and Ladbroke Grove en route to East Acton. Eastbound, the route runs unbroken to Bloomsbury via Marylebone and Fitzrovia. As the route runs on traffic-free or low-traffic routes, it is indirect.
- Grand Union Canal towpath – a shared-use path running direct to Little Venice, Westbourne Park and Willesden, and eventually Hayes. The route is managed by the Canal & River Trust.
- Regent's Canal towpath – runs alongside the Regent's Canal on residential streets from Little Venice to Lisson Grove. The route then joins the towpath, heading eastbound which provides Paddington with a direct connection to Regent's Park, Camden Town and King's Cross. The route is managed by the Canal & River Trust.

Sustrans also propose that National Cycle Route 6 (NCR 6) will begin at Paddington and run northwest along the Grand Union Canal towpath. The route, when complete, will run signposted and unbroken to Keswick, Cumbria. Within the M25, the route will pass through Hayes, Uxbridge and Watford.

Santander Cycles, a London-wide bike sharing system, operates in Paddington, with several docking stations in the area.

=== Canal ===
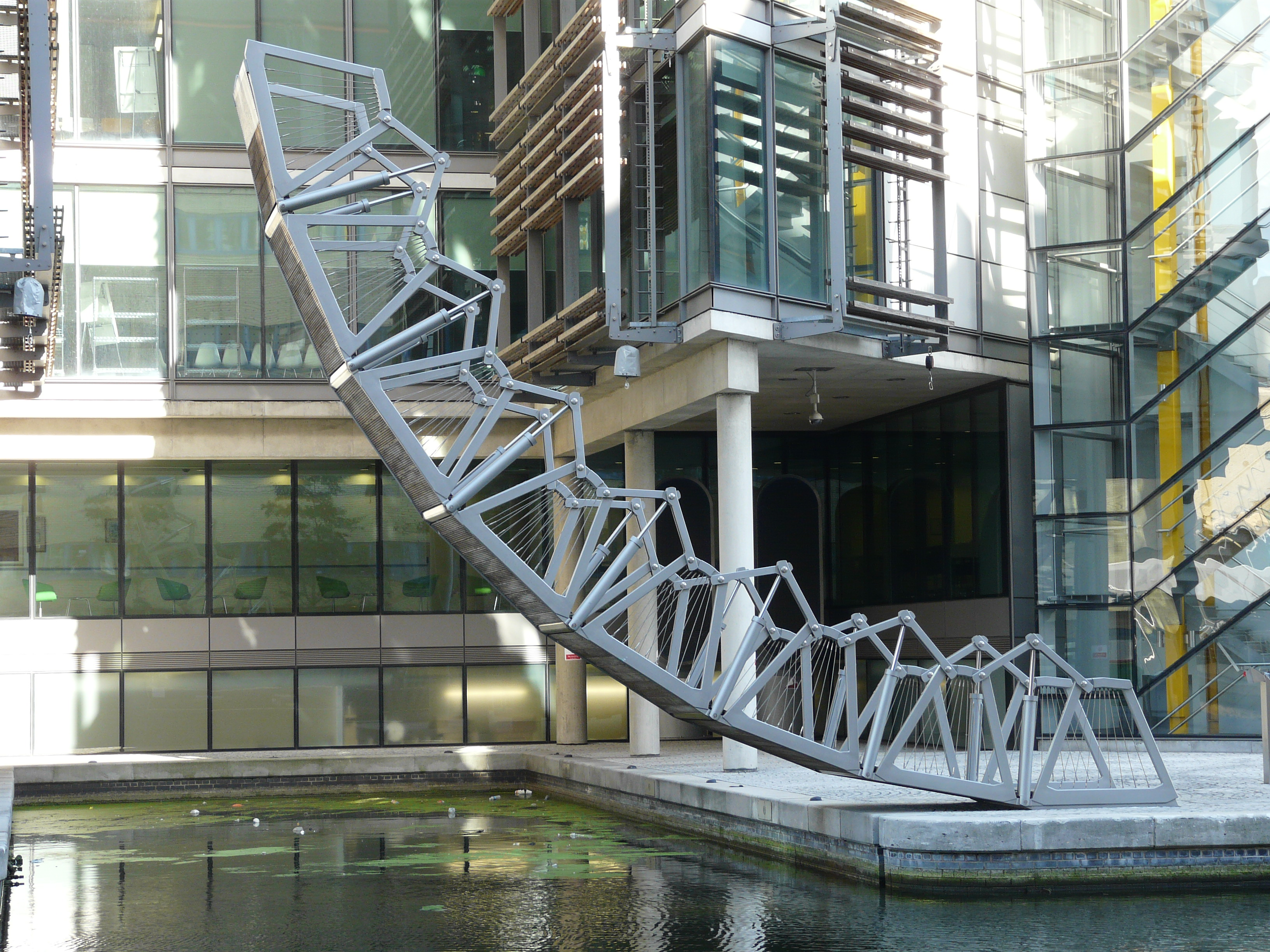
The Rolling Bridge at Paddington, designed by Thomas Heatherwick.

The Paddington Arm of the Grand Union Canal runs from Paddington to Hayes, via Westbourne Park and Willesden. Beyond Hayes, onward destinations include Slough, the Colne Valley, and Aylesbury. The Paddington Basin is in the area, as is Little Venice. A towpath runs unbroken from Paddington to Hayes.

The Rolling Bridge at the Paddington Basin was designed by Thomas Heatherwick, who wanted to create a bridge that, instead of breaking apart to let boats through, would "get out of the way" instead. Heatherwick's website cites the "fluid, coiling tails of the animatronic dinosaurs of Jurassic Park" as the initial influence behind the Bridge.

The Regent's Canal begins at Little Venice, heading east towards Maida Vale, Regent's Park, Camden Town, King's Cross, Old Street and Mile End en route to Limehouse. A towpath runs along the canal from Paddington to Limehouse, broken only by the Maida Hill and Islington tunnels.

== Development ==
Commercial traffic on the Grand Junction Canal (which became the Grand Union Canal in 1929) dwindled because of railway competition in the late-19th and early-20th centuries, and freight then moved from rail to road after World War II, leading to the abandonment of the goods yards in the early 1980s. The land lay derelict until the Paddington Waterside Partnership was established in 1998 to co-ordinate the regeneration of the area between the Westway, Praed Street and Westbourne Terrace. This includes major developments on the goods yard site (now branded Paddington Central) and around the canal (Paddington Basin). As of October 2017 much of these developments have been completed and are in use.

=== Renewal proposal, 2018–2023 ===
PaddingtonNow BID put forward a renewal bid in 2017 covering the period April 2018 to March 2023, which would be supported by a levy on local businesses. Development schemes for St. Mary's Hospital and Paddington Square are likely to commence in this period, and the impact of the opening of the Elizabeth line in 2018 would be soon felt.

== Religion ==
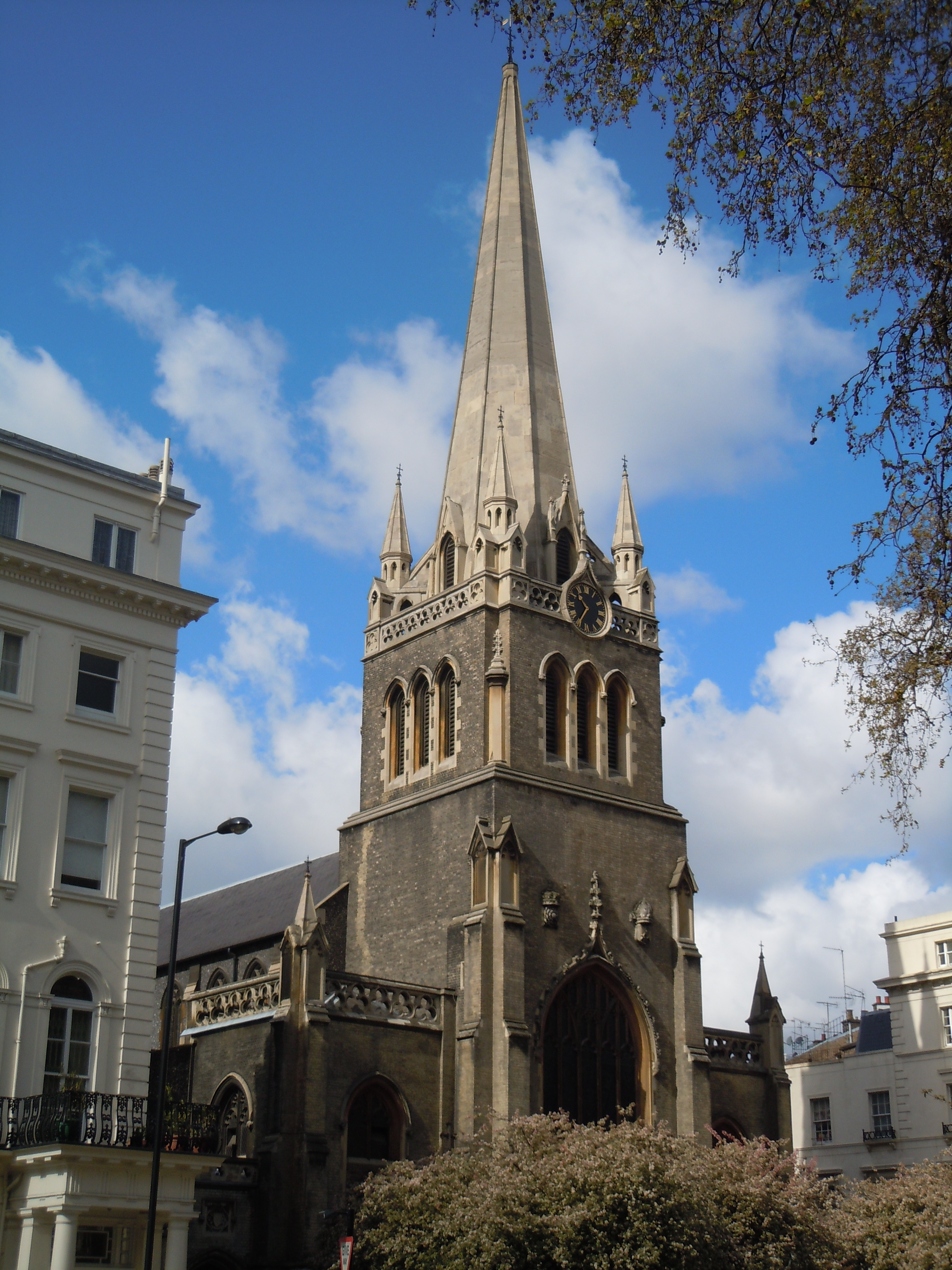
St James's, Sussex Gardens

Paddington has a number of Anglican churches, including St James's, St Mary Magdalene, St David's Welsh Church and St Peter's, Elgin Avenue.

There is a large Muslim population in and around Paddington.

== People from Paddington ==
- Tosin Adarabioyo, professional footballer
- Kriss Akabusi, athlete
- Edward Bailey Ashmore, Army officer
- Robert Baden-Powell, Army officer
- Merton Barker, cricketer and field hockey player
- George Butterworth, classical music composer
- Joe Cole, professional footballer
- Joan Collins, actress
- Elvis Costello, pop musician
- George Thomas Dorrell, recipient of the Victoria Cross
- Paul Eddington, actor
- Les Ferdinand, professional footballer
- Andy Fraser, professional songwriter and bass guitarist
- Ray Galton, comedy writer
- Simon Hawk, cricketer
- Edward Thomas ("E. T.") Heron (1867–1949), cine trade publisher
- William Rees Jeffreys, transport campaigner
- Alan Johnson, politician
- Paddington Tom Jones, boxer
- Patrick Macnee, actor
- Norman Mischler, cricketer
- Rhona Mitra, actress
- Alfred Molina, actor
- Steve New, pop musician
- Hermione Norris, actress
- Paul Onwuanibe, business magnate
- George Osborne, politician
- Michael Page, professional boxer and mixed martial artist
- William Page, historian
- Mark Pougatch, radio and television broadcaster, journalist and author
- Seal, pop musician
- David Suchet, actor
- John Suchet, ITN newsreader, journalist
- Kiefer Sutherland, actor
- Emma Thompson, actress
- Alan Turing, mathematician, engineer
- Ferdinand Maurice Felix West, recipient of the Victoria Cross

== Notable residents ==
Between 1805 and 1817, the great actress Sarah Siddons lived at Desborough House, (which was demolished before 1853 to make way for the Great Western Railway) and was buried at Paddington Green, near the later graves of the eminent painters Benjamin Haydon and William Collins. Her brother Charles Kemble also built a house, Desborough Lodge, in the vicinity—in which she may have lived later. In later years, the actress Yootha Joyce, best known for her part in the classic television comedy George and Mildred, lived at 198 Sussex Gardens.

One of Napoleon's nephews, Prince Louis Lucien Bonaparte (1813–1891), a notable comparative linguist and dialectologist, who spent most of his adult life in England, had a house in Norfolk Terrace, Westbourne Park.

The eccentric philanthropist Ann Thwaytes lived at 17 Hyde Park Gardens between 1840 and 1866.

The Victorian poet Robert Browning moved from No. 1 Chichester Road to Beauchamp Lodge, 19 Warwick Crescent, in 1862 and lived there until 1887. He is reputed to have named that locality, on the junction of two canals, "Little Venice". But this has been disputed by Lord Kinross in 1966 and more recently by londoncanals.uk who both assert that Lord Byron humorously coined the name. The name is now applied, more loosely, to a longer reach of the canal system.

St Mary's Hospital in Praed Street is the site of several notable medical accomplishments. In 1874, C. R. Alder Wright synthesised heroin (diacetylmorphine). Also there, in 1928, Sir Alexander Fleming first isolated penicillin, earning the award of a Nobel Prize. The hospital has an Alexander Fleming Laboratory Museum where visitors can see Fleming's laboratory, restored to its 1928 condition, and explore the story of Fleming and the discovery and development of penicillin through displays and video.

Edward Wilson, physician, naturalist and ornithologist, who died in 1912 on Captain Robert Scott's ill-fated British Antarctic expedition, had earlier practised as a doctor in Paddington. The former Senior Street primary school was renamed the Edward Wilson School after him in 1951.

British painter Lucian Freud had his studio in Paddington, first at Delamere Terrace from 1943 to 1962, and then at 124 Clarendon Crescent from 1962 to 1977.

== In popular culture ==
Timothy Forsyte of John Galsworthy's The Forsyte Saga and other relatives resided in Bayswater Road.

Paddington Bear, from "deepest, darkest Peru", emigrated to England via Paddington station.

The acclaimed BBC fly on the wall documentary series Paddington Green features those living and working in the area.

The phrase, "Back to Paddington", is in reference to the Paddington area and Paddington station, which originated from a moment on the reality tv show The Real Housewives of London, which turned into a pop culture moment and viral moment on social media, where cast member Amanda Cronin told fellow cast member Juliet Angus to go "Back to Paddington" as an insult to her, because at the time, Angus had lived 15 blocks away from Paddington in Notting Hill, and continued to repeat the insult to her until she left. Cronin, in response to the clip of her saying the phrase becoming a pop culture moment, later recorded a song called, "Back To Paddington", released it as a single on 1 May 2026.

== Image gallery ==
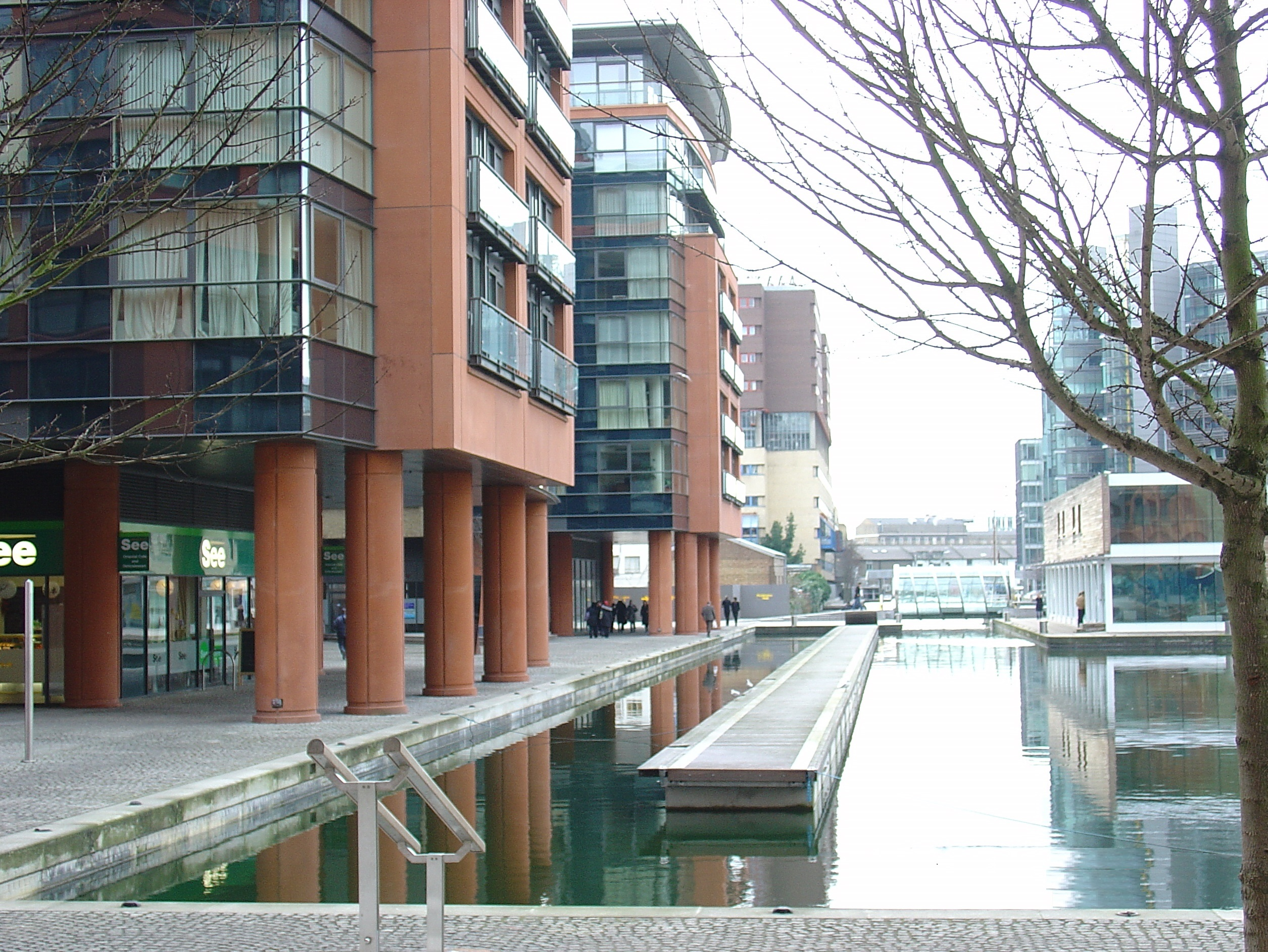
Paddington Basin, Grand Union Canal

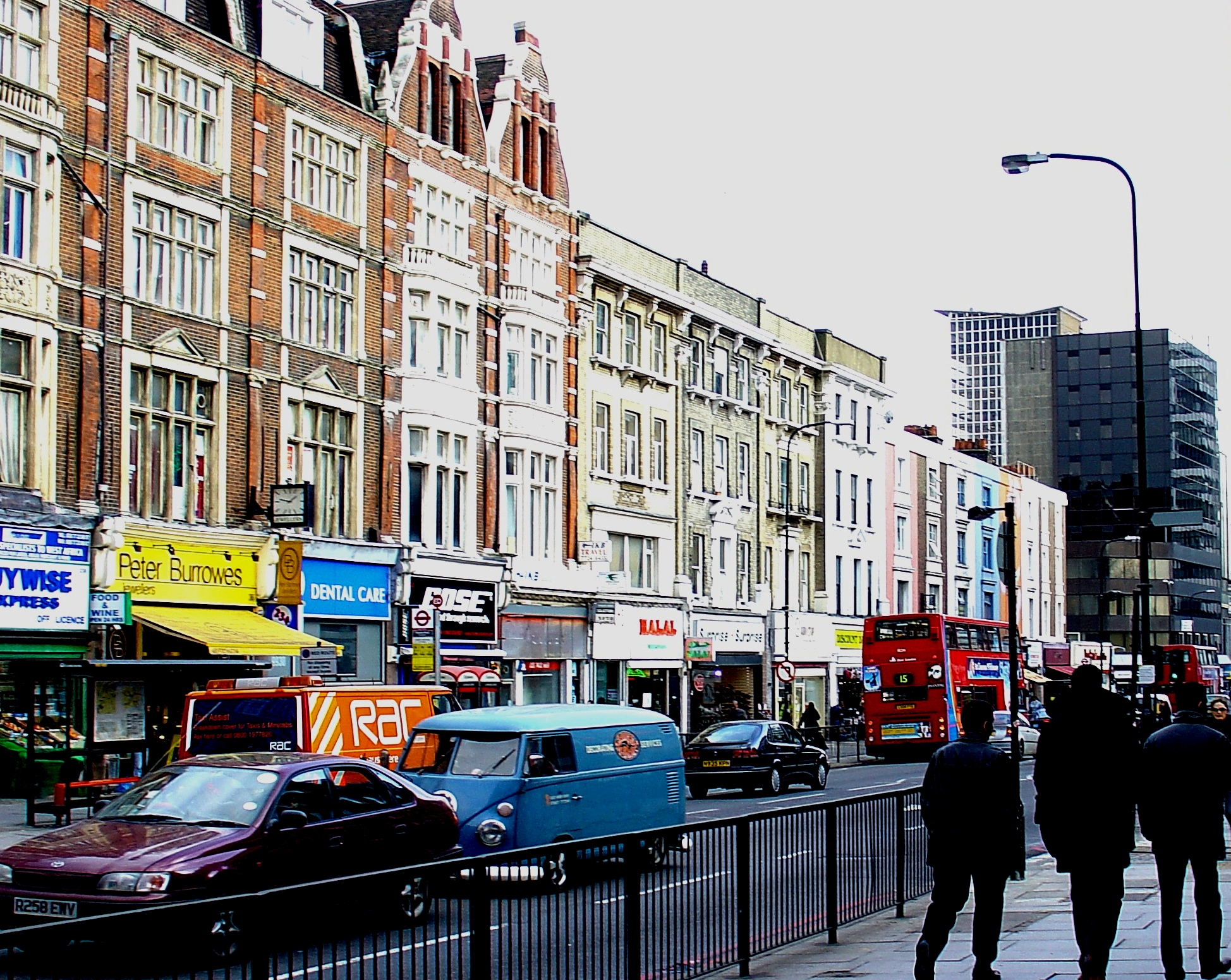
Edgware Road

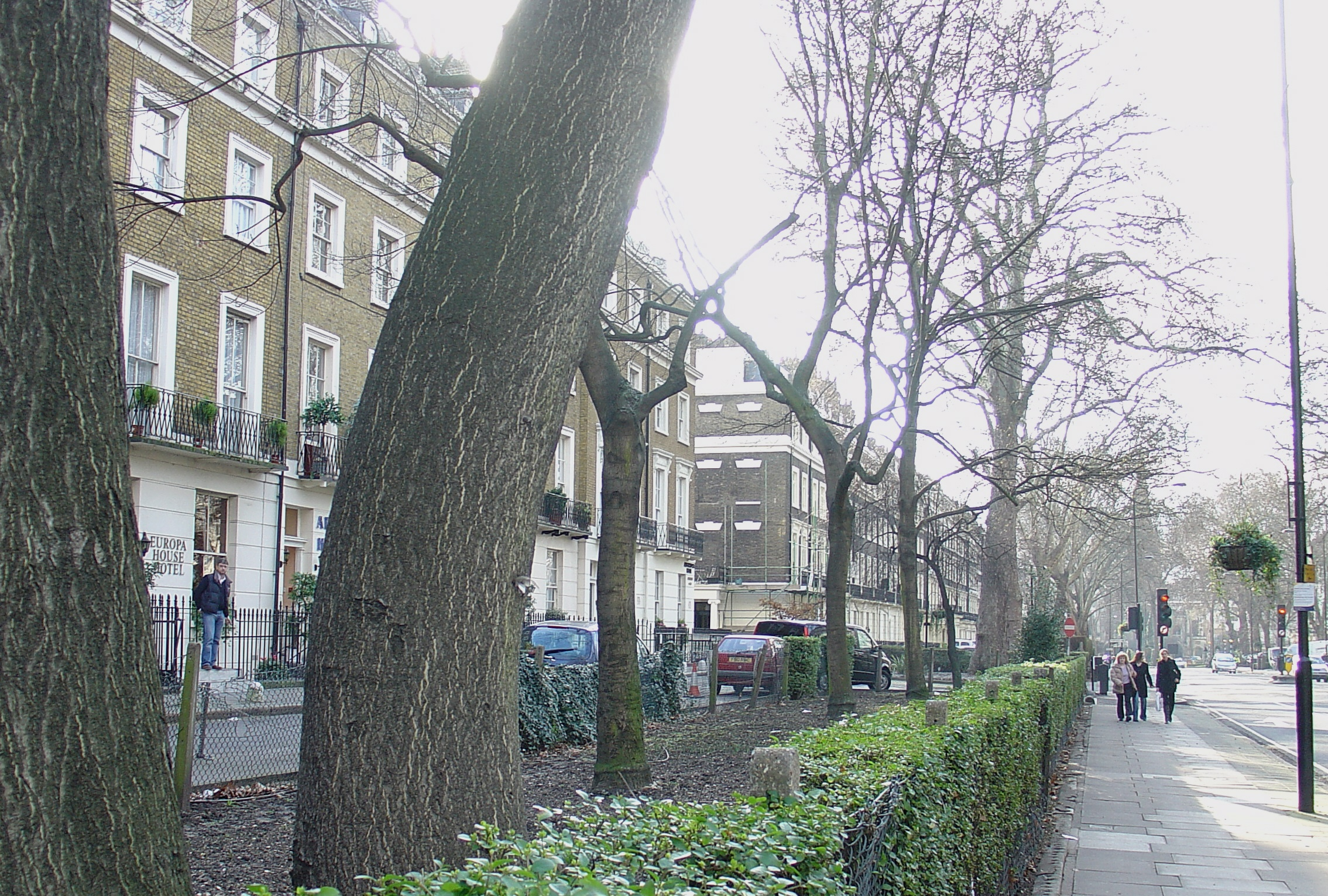
Sussex Gardens

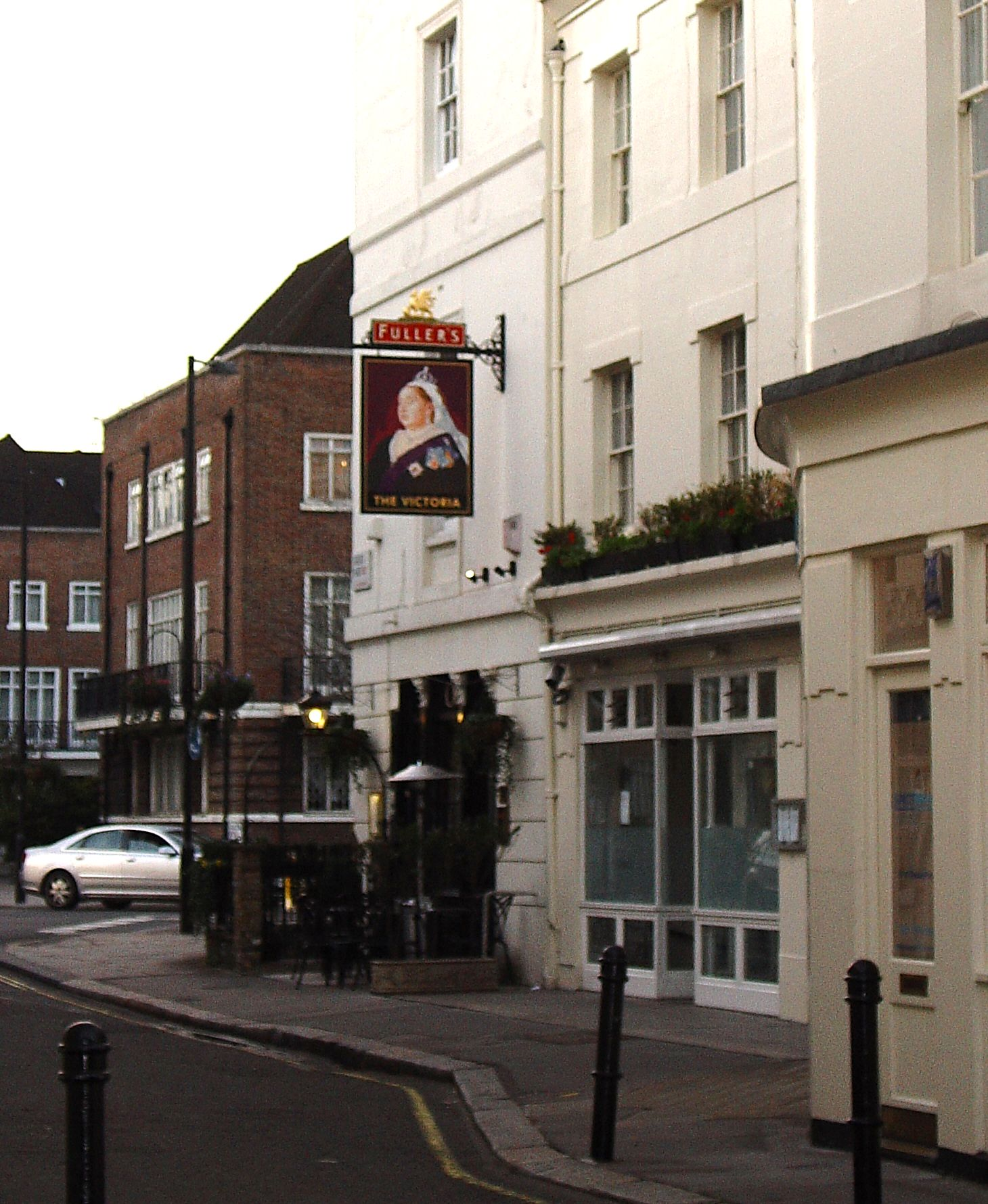
Victoria pub, Gloucester Square

== See also ==
- Paddington Green
- Paddington Bridge
- Paddington Basin
