= Norris Kenyon =

British politician

Norris Vaughan Kenyon (5 June 1903 – 28 April 1958) was a British Conservative Party politician, who became leader of the opposition on London County Council.

== Biography ==
Educated at St Marylebone Grammar School and the University of London, Kenyon began working for his family's company, the undertakers J. H. Kenyon. He also followed his father, Sir Harold Kenyon, into Conservative Party politics.

When he was 24 years old, Kenyon was elected to Paddington Borough Council, becoming an alderman in 1938. At the 1946 London County Council election, he succeeded his father as a Conservative Party councillor for Paddington South. From 1950 until 1952, he was Mayor of Paddington. In 1952, he became leader of the Conservative Party group on the London County Council, and as such, leader of the opposition, remaining in the post until his death.

Kenyon never stood for Parliament, but spent his spare time serving on various committees: the Bracknell New Town Development Corporation, the Court of the University of London, and as a magistrate in Paddington. In 1955, he was knighted.

Party political offices
Preceded by Henry Brooke	Leader of the Conservative Party on London County Council; 1952–1958	Succeeded by Geoffrey Rippon
