= Alice Christine Stickland =

English mathematician

- Born: 16 March 1906; Camberwell, London, England
- Died: 16 April 1987 (aged 81); Northwood, Middlesex, England
- Education: King's College London (BSc), University of London (MSc, PhD)
- Occupations: applied mathematician and astrophysics engineer

Alice Christine Stickland (16 March 1906 – 16 April 1987) was an applied mathematician and astrophysics engineer with interests in radar and radiowave propagation. She worked on long-wave propagation, short-wave propagation and the ionosphere. She was also a supported of the International Council for Science’s Committee on Space Research (COSPAR) and the Girl Guides’ Association.

== Early life ==
Alice Christine Stickland was born in Camberwell, London, on 16 March 1906. Her father was a publisher's clerk.

== Education ==
Stickland studied mathematics at King's College, London, and graduated with a BSc in 1927. She then went on to study privately while working at the in Department of Scientific and Industrial Research at the Radio Research Station (RRS) in Ditton Park.

Stickland first studied for an MSc in mathematical physics in 1929 and then being awarded a PhD in mathematical physics from University of London in 1943. Her dissertation title was "The Propagation of the Magnetic Field of the Electron Magnetic Wave along the Ground and in the Lower Atmosphere."

== Career ==
Stickland worked as an Assistant Grade II scientific civil servant at the Radio Research Station between 1928 and 1947. She worked with radar pioneers, including with Robert Watson-Watt, on long-wave propagation, Reginald Smith-Rose on short-wave propagation, and Edward Appleton on the properties of the ionosphere.

Stickland, along with Smith-Rose, read a paper titled "Ultra-Short Wave Propagation - Comparison Between Theory and Experimental data" at the Institution of Electrical Engineers. The paper described the results of field intensity measurements obtained between 1937 and 1939 using the Post Office radio-telephone link between Guernsey and Chaldon. She was a member of the Institute of Physics and the Physical Society.

She officially retired in 1968, but continued to work as General Editor of the Annals of the International Years of the Quiet Sun (1964-65), and with the International Council for Science’s Committee on Space Research (COSPAR). She was heavily involved in the Girl Guides’ Association.

== Death and legacy ==
Stickland died on 16 April 1987 in Northwood, Middlesex, England.

The new Stickland room at the headquarters of the Institute of Physics in London was named in her honour.

== Selected publications ==
- Ultra-Short Wave Propagation - Comparison Between Theory and Experimental data - Dr. R. L. Smith-Rose, Miss A. C. Stickland
