= Westbourne Studios =

Coordinates: 51.5210°N 0.2045°W

Westbourne Studios is a Westbourne Park, West London office development of approximately 100 work spaces, aimed at young creative businesses in the Notting Hill area.

Completed in January 2002, the studios were built on the site of the old Great Western Railway Broad Gauge sidings by Westbourne Park tube station. Dickon Robinson of the Peabody Trust described the studio's courtyard as "the most interesting internal space in London in the last decade". The building is a triangular, curvilinear structure in a deep shade of purple. In section, the profile is U-shaped with the Westway motorway crossing the building's centre, doubling as roof to the central social area. It was designed by Graham Clark architect for clients Nick and Simon Kirkham with John Tooke and Partners as structural engineers and Patrick Bellew of Atelier10 was the environmental engineer. Though the design was originally accredited to the Kirkhams in the press, retractions have been issued and Graham Clark has been acknowledged as the designer of the project.

In addition to the office facilities, the building has a variety of communal spaces, a bar and café, an exhibition space and other amenities. It has hosted an opera, and is a venue for the Portobello Film Festival.
