= Henry Gott =

British gardener (1731–1809)

Sir Henry Thomas Gott (1731 – 14 November 1809), born Henry Thomas Greening, was the son of Thomas Greening (died February 1757), gardener to King George II. Thomas Greening had held royal contracts from the 1720s onward. His mother Sarah was the daughter of Henry Marsh of Hammersmith (1665-1741), who was known as a collector of rare and unusual trees. Henry Thomas Greening inherited the family nursery garden at Brentford End.

== Biography ==
In 1761 he married Ann, daughter of Richard Hooper of Kington, Herefordshire with whom he had 6 children. Between 1762 and 1765 he worked at Windsor and Cumberland House for Prince William, Duke of Cumberland. In 1769, Henry Greening changed his surname to Gott, as directed by the terms of the will of his cousin Mary Gott of Streat, Sussex. He purchased Newland Park, Chalfont St Peter, Buckinghamshire in 1770. He was knighted in 1774, when he served as High Sheriff of Buckinghamshire.

His daughter Sarah married first Robert Whitcombe of The Whittern, Lyonshall, and secondly Sir Harford Jones Brydges, 1st Baronet. Sarah's mother and the mothers of both of her husbands, were sisters, the daughters of Richard Hooper of Lyonshall.
