= Harford Jones-Brydges =

British diplomat and author (1764–1847)

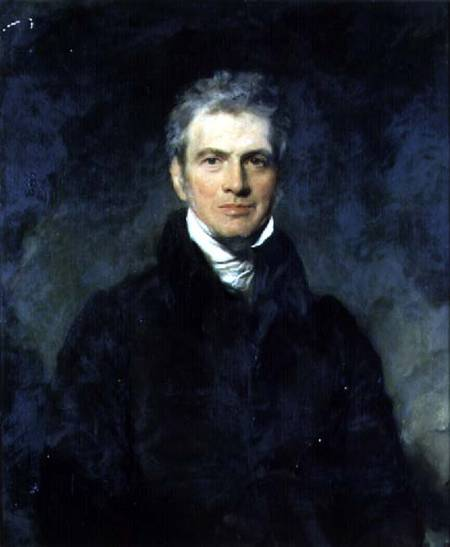
Portrait, oil on canvas, of Sir Harford Jones Brydges, 1st Baronet (1764–1847) by Sir Thomas Lawrence (1769–1830)

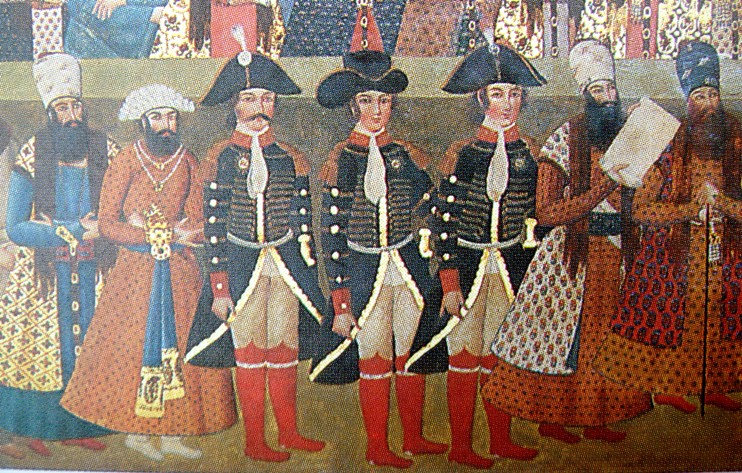
The British delegation at the Court of Fath Ali Shah in 1808: John Malcolm, Harford Jones and Gore Ouseley.

Sir Harford Jones-Brydges, 1st Baronet, DL (12 January 1764 – 17 March 1847) was a British diplomat and author during the late 18th century and early 19th century.

== Life ==
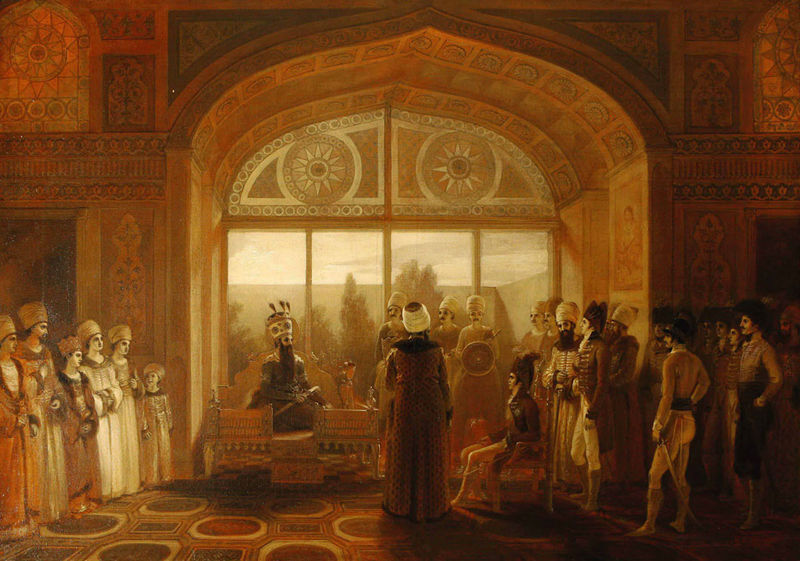
Harford Jones (seated right) in the court of Fath-Ali Shah Qajar. By Robert Smirke

Born on 12 January 1764, Sir Harford Jones-Brydges was the son of Harford Jones of Presteign, Radnorshire by Winifred, daughter of Richard Hooper of the Whittern, Herefordshire. Early in life he entered the service of the East India Company, and, acquiring great proficiency in the oriental languages, he was appointed the Company's first Resident and Consul in Baghdad.

In 1798, fearing that Napoleon's expedition to Egypt might present a threat to British interests in India, the Company's Directors accepted a suggestion to establish a Residency in Baghdad. The Residency in Baghdad was intended to provide direct access to the Mamluk ruler (provincial governor) there, rather than through an agent of the Company Resident in Basra. Harford Jones had been the Company's Assistant Resident in Basra since 1784, and seems to have lobbied for establishing the post in Baghdad. However, various circumstances rendered him largely ineffective, except in arranging for the Company's overland mail to use a more secure and less expensive route through Baghdad instead of across the desert from Aleppo. He finally left Baghdad in 1806.

Subsequently, he was appointed envoy extraordinary and minister plenipotentiary to the court of Persia, where he remained four years from 1807 to 1811. On 9 October 1807 he was created a baronet. On his return from Persia he was disappointed with the prospects of promotion in the East India Company, and resigned.

In a royal sign manual dated 4 May 1826, in commemoration of his descent through his maternal grandmother from the family of Brydges of Old Colwall, Herefordshire, he assumed the additional name of Brydges.

He died at his seat at Boultibrook, Presteigne on 17 March 1847. Through his marriage with Sarah, eldest daughter of the knight Sir Henry Gott of Newland Park, Buckinghamshire he had one son and two daughters.

== Persia ==
Throughout life he a deep interest in the welfare both of the Persians and the natives of India. In 1833 he published The Dynasty of the Kajars, translated from the original Persian manuscript, in the following year An Account of His Majesty's Mission to the Court of Persia in the years 1807–11, to which is added a brief history of the Wahauby.

In 1838, his Letter on the Present State of British Interests and Affairs in Persia, addressed to the Marquis of Wellesley.

In 1843, he pleaded the cause of the ameers of Sind in a letter to the court of directors of the East India Company, denouncing the latter's policy of annexation and conquest.

== Politics ==
He served as High Sheriff of Radnorshire for 1816.

Politically, he was a Whig, and took an active interest in the election contests of Radnorshire, where he founded a political association known as the Grey Coat Club.

On 15 June 1831, he received the honorary degree of D.C.L. from the University of Oxford. In 1832, he was sworn a privy councillor, and, in 1841, was appointed deputy-lieutenant of the county of Hereford.

Baronetage of the United Kingdom
New creation	Baronet (of Boultibrook); 1807–1847	Succeeded by Harford Jones-Brydges
