= List of mayors of Paddington =

This is a list of people who held the office of mayor of the Metropolitan Borough of Paddington. The office was created in 1900 and abolished in 1965.

== List of mayors of Paddington from 1900-1965 ==
=== 1900s ===
- 1900-1901 John Aird MP. Created a baronet, March 1901.
- 1901-1902 Sir John Aird MP (second term)
- 1902-1903 Henry Andrade Harben
- 1903-1904 John Williams
- 1904-1905 William Urquhart
- 1905-1906 Herbert Lidiard
- 1906-1907 Herbert Lidiard (second term)
- 1907-1908 Lieutenant-General John Wimburn Laurie
- 1908-1909 Herbert Henry Fuller
- 1909-1910 Herbert Henry Fuller (second term)

=== 1910s ===
- 1910-1911 Herbert Lidiard (third term)
- 1911-1912 William George Perring
- 1912-1913 Harry George Handover
- 1913-1914 Harry George Handover (second term)
- 1914-1915 Harry George Handover (third term)
- 1915-1916 Harry George Handover (fourth term)
- 1916-1917 Harry George Handover (fifth term)
- 1917-1918 Harry George Handover (sixth term)
- 1918-1919 Harry George Handover (seventh term)
- 1919-1920 Harry George Handover (eighth term)

=== 1920s ===
- 1920-1921 Harold Vaughan Kenyon
- 1921-1922 Harold Vaughan Kenyon (second term)
- 1922-1923 Harold Vaughan Kenyon (third term)
- 1923-1924 Harold Vaughan Kenyon (fourth term)
- 1924-1925 Colin Stanley Crosse
- 1925-1926 Leonard Thomas Snell
- 1926-1927 Leonard Thomas Snell (second term)
- 1927-1928 Alfred Instone
- 1928-1929 Leonard Thomas Snell (third term)
- 1929-1930 Leonard Thomas Snell (fourth term)

=== 1930s ===
- 1930-1931 Leonard Thomas Snell (fifth term)
- 1931-1932 Sir Harry George Handover (ninth term)
- 1932-1933 Sir Harry George Handover (tenth term)
- 1933-1934 Sir Harry George Handover (eleventh term)
- 1934-1935 Sir Harry George Handover (twelfth term)
- 1935-1936 Harold Vaughan Kenyon (fifth term)
- 1936-1937 Harold Vaughan Kenyon (sixth term). Knighted 1937.
- 1937-1938 John Burgess Preston Karslake
- 1938-1939 Henry Halford Dawes
- 1939-1940 Henry Halford Dawes (second term) (died 17 February 1940)

=== 1940s ===
- 1940 (February–November) John Burgess Preston Karslake (second term)
- 1940-1941 Frank Stanley Henwood
- 1941-1942 Frank Stanley Henwood (second term)
- 1942-1943 Arthur Henry Barrett
- 1943-1944 Arthur Henry Barrett (second term)
- 1944-1945 Frederick Lawrence
- 1945-1946 Henry Berkwood Hobsbaum
- 1946-1947 Edward Avery
- 1947-1949 James Eugene MacColl
- 1949-1950 Arthur Henry Barrett (third term)

=== 1950s ===
- 1950-1951 Norris Kenyon
- 1951-1952 Norris Kenyon (second term)
- 1952-1953 (William) Ernest Harriss
- 1953-1954 Col Walter Parkes. Chairman of the Board of Governors of St Mary's Hospital 1920-49.
- 1954-1955 Stanley Howard Crosse
- 1955-1956 Catherine Priscilla Rabagliati 3 January 1885–1973
- 1956-1957 Catherine Rabagliati (second term)
- 1957-1958 Major James Collins
- 1958-1959 Alexander Norman Carruthers born 1901
- 1959-1960 Raymond Robert Brown 20 August 1895–1973

=== 1960s ===
- 1960-1961 Arthur C Barrett
- 1961-1962 Patrick Barry
- 1962-1963 Denis McNair
- 1963-1964 Major James Collins (second term)
- 1964-1965 Jack Gillett (later Lord Mayor of Westminster 1976-77)
