= Paddington Town Hall, London =

Municipal building in London, England

Paddington Town Hall
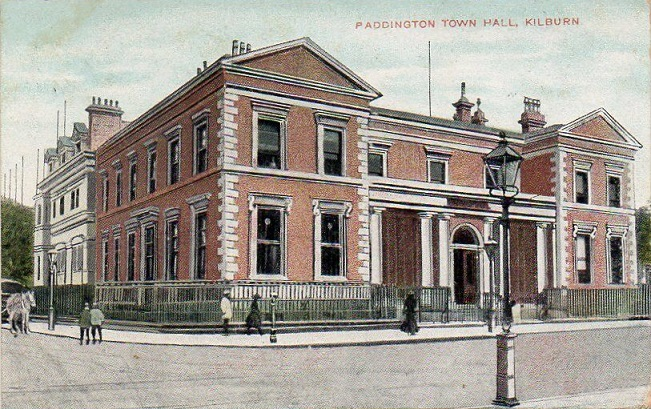
- Paddington Town Hall

- Shown in Westminster
- 51.5200°N 0.1763°W
- Location: Harrow Road, Paddington

History
- Built: 1853
- Demolished: 1965

Site notes
- Architect: James Lockyer
- Architectural style: Neoclassical style

Paddington Town Hall was a municipal building in Harrow Road, Paddington, London. The structure, which was the headquarters of the Paddington Metropolitan Borough Council, was demolished in 1965.

== History ==
The building was commissioned as a vestry hall for St Mary on Paddington Green Church: the site selected for the building, which had previously been identified for potential use as an additional burial ground, was immediately to the west of the church on the north side of Harrow Road.

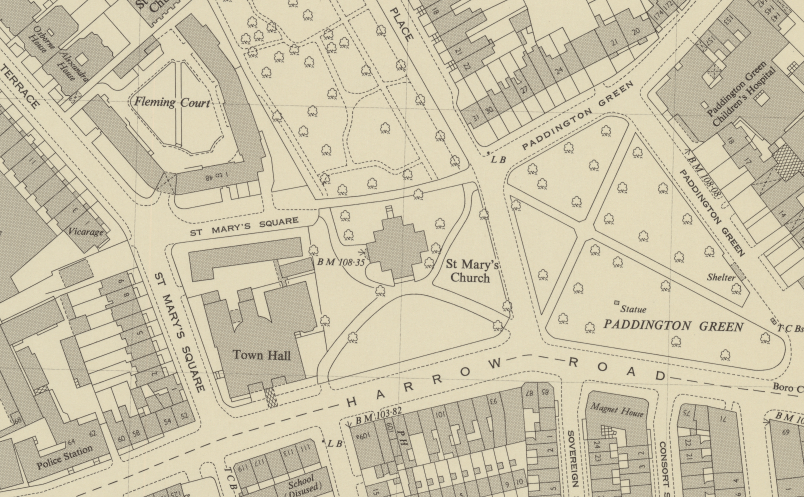
Paddington Green and Town Hall on a 1954 map

The new hall was designed by James Lockyer in the neoclassical style, built in white brick with stone dressings and was completed in 1853. The design involved a symmetrical main frontage with seven bays facing onto Harrow Road with the last two bays at each end projected forward as pavilions; the central section of three bays, featured a porch formed by a colonnade of Tuscan order columns supporting a canopy. The building became the headquarters of the Metropolitan Borough of Paddington when it was formed in 1900; it was enlarged at that time and enlarged again in 1920.

A war memorial made of teak panels intended to commemorate the lives of service personnel who had died in the First World war was installed in the outer hall of the town hall in 1924. The building served as sleeping accommodation for female telephone operators working for the local Air Raid Precautions Staff during the Second World War. On the night of the 14 March 1940 the Irish Republican Army detonated a bomb close to the town hall; no-one was injured in the attack. A high-profile public inquiry took place in the town hall in October 1954: developers had proposed to erect three blocks of flats to be named "Perkins Heights" on part of Paddington Green. London County Council opposed the scheme, which ultimately did not proceed, and Paddington Technical Institute established a campus there instead.

The building continued to serve as the headquarters of the metropolitan borough for much of the 20th century but ceased to be the local seat of government when the enlarged City of Westminster was formed in 1965. It was then demolished to make way for the Westway urban motorway later that year. The original teak war memorial panels were destroyed when the building was demolished, as no home could be found for them, but a three-volume book of remembrance was relocated to St James's Church, Paddington. A green plaque was erected on the Paddington Exchange Building at the corner of Harrow Road and Hermitage Street, in 2015, to commemorate the site of the former town hall under the Westway.
