= Newland Park, Chalfont St Peter =

Coordinates: 51.63289°N 0.54166°W

Newland Park
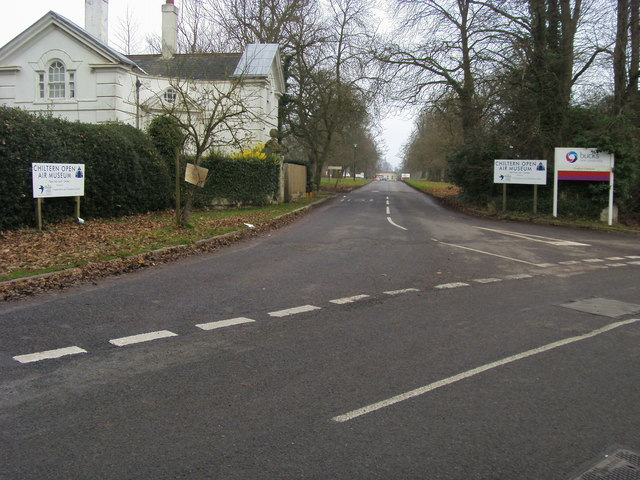
- Interactive map of the Newland Park area

General information
- Type: Country house
- Architectural style: Georgian
- Location: Chalfont St Peter, Buckinghamshire, United Kingdom

Newland Park is a Grade II listed country house and estate near the village of Chalfont St Peter in Buckinghamshire.

== History ==
Henry Gott bought Newland Park in c. 1770 where he entertained King George III, and, in 1785, erected an obelisk called Gott's Monument to commemorate the death of a stag killed during a hunt with the king. The estate was purchased by Thomas Allen in 1809 after Gott's death, and was inherited by his son Thomas Newland Allen on his death in 1829. Mrs Edmund Stevens, Allen's daughter, inherited Newland Park on her father's death in 1898, and sold the estate to Henry Andrade Harben in 1903.

The gardens were designed by Thomas Hayton Mawson in 1903. After Henry Andrade Harben's death in 1910, the estate was inherited by his son Henry Devenish Harben, under whom Newland Park became a refuge for suffragettes from 1910 to 1921; he and his wife Agnes Harben (who later founded the United Suffragists) was visited by Emmeline Pankhurst, George Bernard Shaw, Sidney and Beatrice Webb and H. G. Wells. In April 1939, the estate was purchased by North British and Mercantile Insurance and staff were evacuated to the newly erected offices and living accommodation in August. The Newland Park Training College was an emergency teacher training college opened at the estate on 1 March 1946.

Newland Park College of Education merged with High Wycombe College of Art and Technology to form Buckinghamshire College of Higher Education in 1975. In 1976, the Chiltern Open Air Museum was established in the grounds of the estate. In 1989, Amersham Hockey Club was granted a 28-year licence by the college to operate on the estate, and an astroturf pitch was built with funding from Chiltern District Council for use by college students and the club, in the following year.

The television series Class Act (1994-1995) and Thief Takers (1995-1997) were partly filmed at Newland Park House. In 1999, the college was awarded university college status, and became known as Buckinghamshire Chilterns University College. The 2000 film Cor, Blimey! was partly filmed at the main entrance to Newland Park. The university was renamed Buckinghamshire New University in 2007, and the university closed its campus at Newland Park on 1 August 2009.

The university sold Newland Park to Comer Group on 1 July 2011, and, in 2012, Newland Park House and gardens were leased to an events and weddings company. Newland College opened in September 2015, and was renamed Chalfonts Independent Grammar School in 2017. The Amersham and Chalfont Hockey Club (the successor of Amersham Hockey Club) ceased to operate at Newland Park and relocated to Amersham in spring 2017.

The Comer Group was granted planning permission to build 309 homes at the estate in 2016, but came into conflict with the Chiltern Open Air Museum in 2022 due to a failure to transfer the freehold as per the terms of the planning permission.

== Bibliography ==
- Jones, Mark (2015). Film and TV locations in the Chilterns and Thames Valley, 1940-2014.
- Page, William (1925). A History of the County of Buckingham, vol. 3. Victoria County History.
- Pevsner, Nikolaus; Williamson, Elizabeth (1994). The Buildings of England: Buckinghamshire. Yale University Press.
