= Henry Andrade Harben =

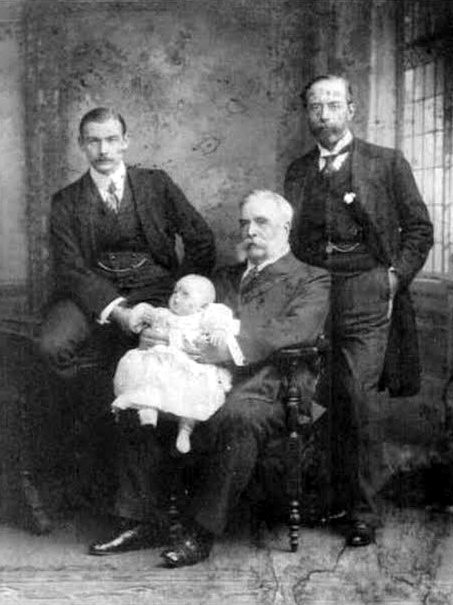
Henry Andrade Harben (right) with his father Sir Henry Harben (seated), and son Henry Devenish Harben (left).

Henry Andrade Harben FSA (12 August 1849 – 18 August 1910) was a barrister, insurance company director, politician, and historian of London. His highly regarded book, A Dictionary of London, was published posthumously in 1917.

== Early life and family ==
Henry Harben was born at Hounslow, Middlesex, on 12 August 1849 to Sir Henry Harben (1823–1911), chairman of the Prudential Assurance Company, and his wife Ann, née Such. He graduated from the University College London in 1868. He married Mary Frances James in 1873. Their son was the politician and supporter of women's suffrage, Henry Devenish Harben. They had five other children.

== Career ==
Harben was called to the bar at Lincoln's Inn in 1871. In 1879, he followed his father into the Prudential as a director and was chairman of the company from 1907 until his death.

== Public positions ==
In 1878, Harben became a freeman of the City of London.

Harben entered local politics as a member of the Paddington Vestry and from 1900 for the successor Paddington Borough Council, and he was Mayor of Paddington in 1902–03. He was a Moderate Party member of the London County Council, first elected to represent Paddington (South) in 1898 and re-elected twice, retaining his seat until 1907.

He was chairman of the Central Hospital Council of London and in 1897 joined the board of St Mary's Hospital. He was chairman from 1903 and then held various other positions at the hospital. He was a justice of the peace for Buckinghamshire and the County of London.

== History ==
Harben was elected a fellow of the Society of Antiquaries of London in 1893 and became a member of the Sussex Archaeological Society in 1894.

Around 1888, Harben began to compile a new edition of John Stow's Survey of London (1598) but progress was very slow and that objective was abandoned after C.L. Kingsford's new edition of Stow appeared in 1908 and Harben decided to turn his book into a dictionary of London instead. The book was still unfinished at the time of his death and was eventually completed by his friend I.I. Greaves and published posthumously in 1917 as A Dictionary of London. It deals only with the City of London.

== Death and legacy ==
Harben died on 18 August 1910 at 29 Wimpole Street, London, following complications after surgery. His address at the time of his death was Newland Park, Chalfont St. Peter, Buckinghamshire, and Hertfordshire. He left an estate of £349,845. Harben left his collection of around 2,000 items relating to the history of Greater London to the London County Council.

== Selected publications ==
- A Dictionary of London: Being notes topographical and historical relating to the streets and principal buildings in the city of London ... With six plans. H. Jenkins, London, 1918 [1917]. (Edited by I. I. Greaves)
