= David Harban =

David Harban is a graphic artist specializing in printmaking. He exhibited his prints in one of the Royal Birmingham Society of Artists Gallery's ‘Open’ exhibitions, where he was supported by some of the other members of the Society. He then became a full Member of the Society in 2008. Harban is an elected member of the Easel Club and the Birmingham Art Circle.

David's work is heavily inspired by landscapes and many of Birmingham's historical buildings.

His carvings were made on a copper plate, using modern and traditional methods, and were hand-printed on a traditional press.
