= Westbourne, London =

Area in central-west London, England

Coordinates: 51.516°N 0.197°W

Westbourne
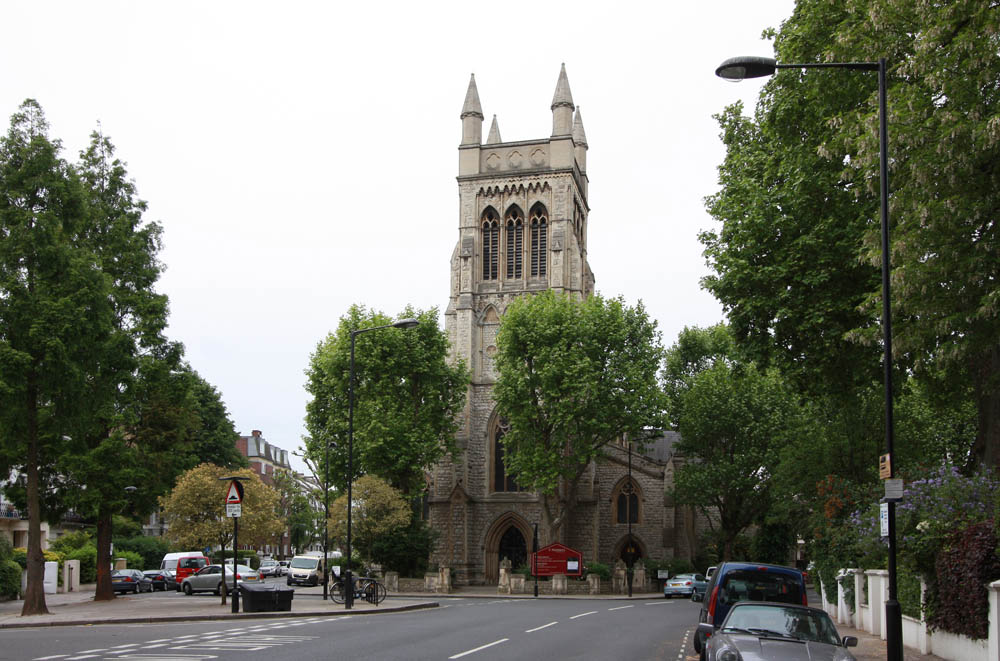
- St Stephen's Church, Westbourne Park Road

- Location within Greater London
- London borough: Westminster
- Ceremonial county: Greater London
- Region: London
- Country: England
- Sovereign state: United Kingdom
- Post town: LONDON
- Postcode district: W2/W11/W9
- Dialling code: 020
- Police: Metropolitan
- Fire: London
- Ambulance: London
- UK Parliament: Queen's Park and Maida Vale; Kensington and Bayswater
- London Assembly: West Central

A map showing the Westbourne ward of Paddington Metropolitan Borough as it appeared in 1916. A note in the Victoria County History which was written for this area later than most, in 1989, states that in 1901 the prominent western projection of Church ward (shown) formed part of what residents and groups then widely considered to be Westbourne or Westbourne Green.

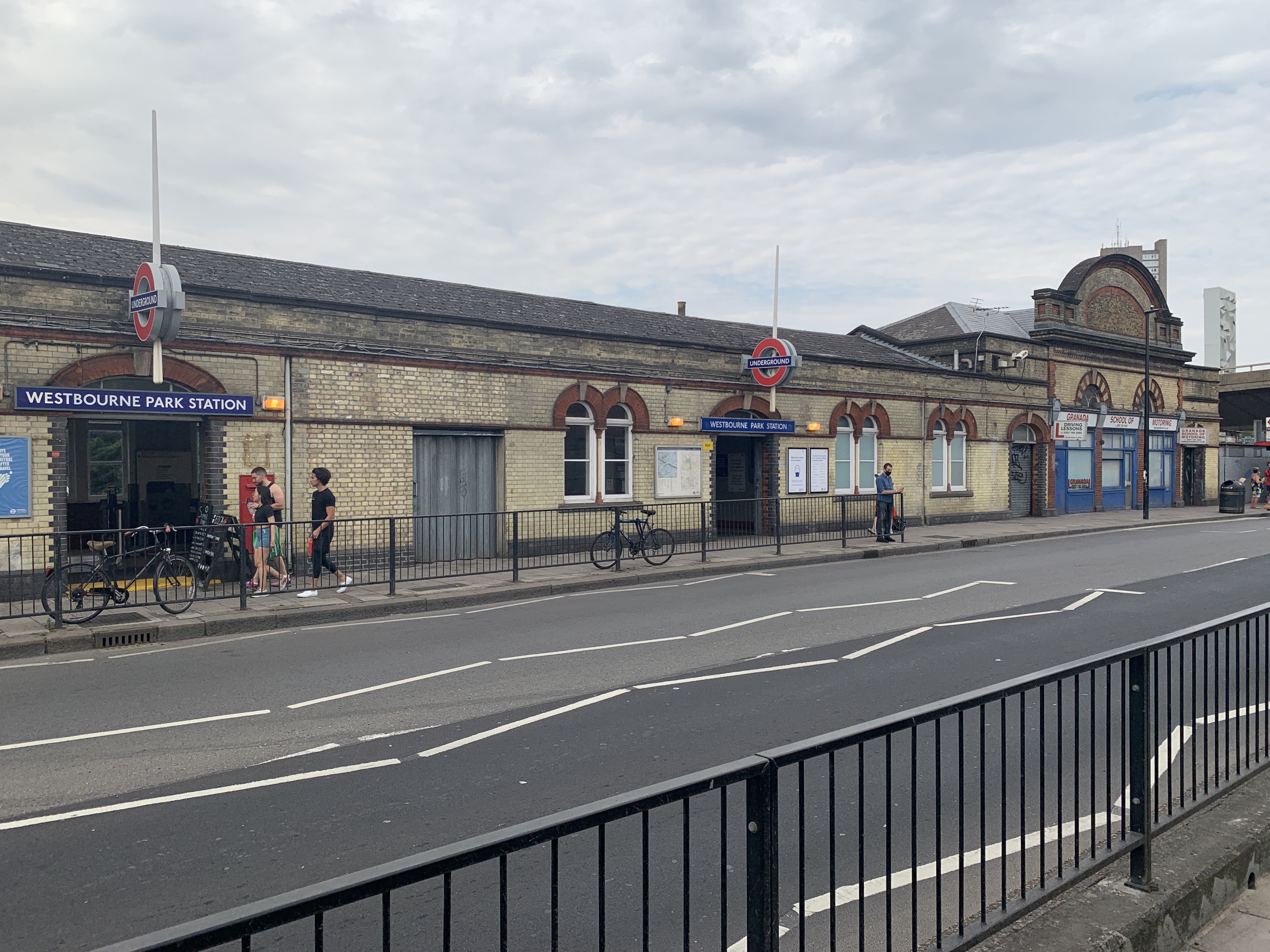
Westbourne Park tube station, 2020

Westbourne is an area in West London. It has a manorial history spanning many centuries, within a more broadly defined Paddington, before shedding its association in the mid-19th century. It is named after the west bourne, West Bourne, or River Westbourne, a Thames tributary which was encased in 19th-century London in the 1850s. The spring-fed stream and associated manor have led to the place names Westbourne Green, Westbourne Park and more narrowly: Westbourne Gardens, Westbourne Grove, Westbourne Park Road, Westbourne Park tube station, Westbourne Studios and the name of a public house.

Westbourne forms or resembles an electoral ward of the local authority which is, since 1965, Westminster City Council, and an ecclesiastical parish in the Church of England. Westbourne Conservation Area is a smaller area, designated by the local authority, in Planning Law.

== Early history ==
The hamlet of Westbourne was a High Middle Ages (mid-medieval) settlement, centred on Westbourne Green. It included a mansion house and a farmhouse. It is recorded as Westeburn in 1222 and as Westborn in 1294. The green is recorded as Westborne Grene in 1548, Washborne Green in 1680 and Wesborn Green in 1754.

== Modern name and definitions ==
The manorial bounds of Westbourne were kept alive by business names and residents' groups and associations after housing development.

The southern part of Westbourne green at first was sometimes known as Westbournia. The name, however, also applied to streets south of Westbourne Grove which might have been described more correctly as in Bayswater: Trollope's Westbournia of 1858 was the fashionable neighbourhood of Westbourne Terrace, and c. 1860 Westbourne Grove was recorded as Westbournia's main thoroughfare rather than its boundary. By 1900 Bayswater was thought to end at Westbourne Grove, leaving the district to the north, whose status had fallen, without a general name.

— Paddington: Westbourne T F T Baker, Diane K Bolton and Patricia E C Croot and others, 1989

A short-lived London Underground station existed from 1866 until 1871, when it was replaced by one nearby, to the east. Until 1992, the station had extra platforms on its north side for the overground Great Western Main Line. To the north and east were extensive railway yards. Excellent transport and ease of access of fashionable commerce such as in Marylebone encouraged many City of London affluent workers and the political class of Westminster to live in the area. More recently, the Westbourne Park bus garage was built, replacing railway yards north-east of the station, across the Western Avenue, London.

Use of "Westbourne", unsuffixed by "Park" or "Green", has faded but not passed; it has an electoral and a planning definition.

1. The area resembles and can be defined loosely as Westbourne ward, one of twenty Westminster City Council electoral districts, north of the Westway and around the Great Western Road. Wards are drawn by an independent commission to aim for equality of electorate, instead of containing interrelated housing, to avoid malapportionment. The population at the 2011 Census was 12,759.
2. A narrower definition is the Westbourne Conservation Area identified since the late 20th century to maintain coherent classical architecture building schemes in Planning Law; its history, structure and layout mirrors the bulk of neighbouring Bayswater.

== Manor and parish ==
The manor of Westbourne was distinct from the manor of Paddington but, lacking a church, it did not form its own parish. Instead, it was western part of the parish of Paddington through which it paid tithes and received the vestry's administration such as in the poor law. The River Westbourne, running north to south, delimited Westbourne from Paddington. In later years the manorial courts sat across Bayswater and Hyde Park in Knightsbridge; the manor became known as "the Manor of Westbourne with Knightsbridge".

== Buildings and famous residents ==
In 1746, Westbourne Green had five main houses, the largest of these being Westbourne Place (also known as Westbourne House), which had been rebuilt as an elegant Georgian mansion in 1745 by the architect Isaac Ware. The mansion had three storeys, with the frontage divided into three parts widthwise, and nine windows. The middle portion was topped by a large pediment and contained the further pedimented main door. Each end of the lower two storeys were formed into tri-windowed bays. Residents in turn included: baronet Sir William Yorke, a Venetian ambassador, architect Samuel Pepys Cockerell (a distant relative of diarist Samuel Pepys) and General Rowland Hill, 1st Viscount Hill (Commander-in-Chief of the Army, 1828–39). Hill gave his name to Lord Hill's Bridge and left the house in 1836. Following Hill's departure, the mansion was demolished and replaced by the current gardened houses of Westbourne Park Villas. Lord Hill's Bridge remains abutting the Villas; it accommodates Royal Oak tube station and joins Porchester Road with Harrow Road below the Westway.

Westbourne Farm was centred where the Westway, Harrow Road and Paddington Arm, a canal, converge; in 1815–17 home to actress Sarah Siddons and her daughter. The actress was buried and has a headstone at St Mary's Church on Paddington Green (then the area's parish).

Thomas Hardy lived in this area, mainly at 16 Westbourne Park Villas, his home 1863–67.

The radio presenter and DJ Nihal Arthanayake used to live in Westbourne Park, near the Harrow Road.

== Brunel, Westmead and Wessex Gardens Estates ==
By the 1960s many of the mansion houses with large grounds had become part of Peter Rachman's property empire; they were demolished by the local authority after his death to make way for two large housing estates mainly based on meeting social housing needs: the 10-acre (4.0 ha) Brunel estate (1970s), and the Wessex Gardens estate (1978), named for the fictional county of many of Hardy's works. In Wessex Gardens the first of 300 homes (dwellings) planned for 1,116 people were ready in 1978. Westmead was built, as 148 homes in 1974, to replace a relatively low-quality segment of housing. In 2020, that part of the landscape of the Brunel Estate which forms a public park, was designated at Grade II on the Register of Historic Parks and Gardens of Special Historic Interest in England.
