= Westbourne Gardens =

Street in Westbourne Green, Notting Hill London

Coordinates: 51.5172°N 0.1906°W

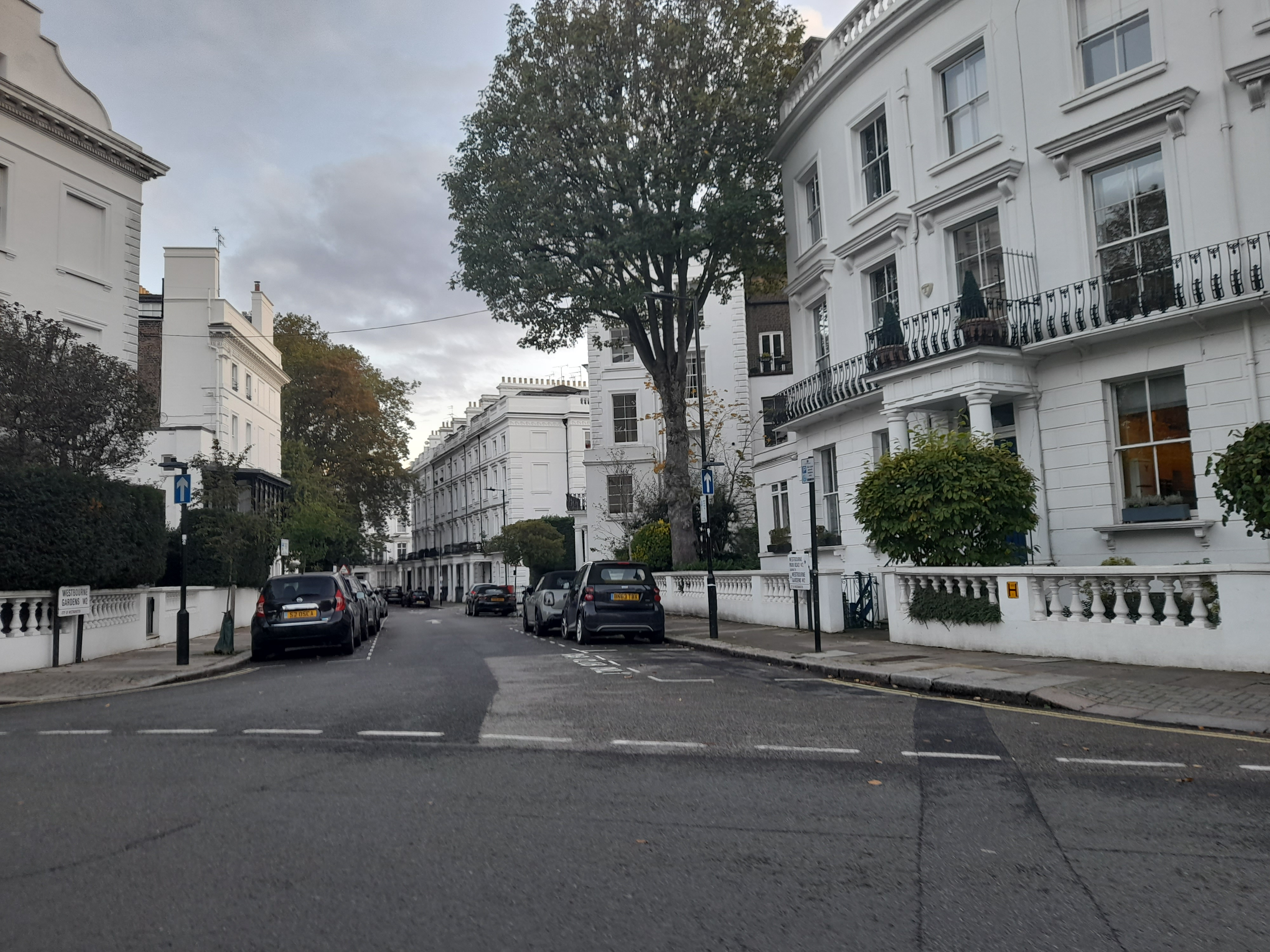
Georgian townhouses surrounding Westbourne Gardens

Westbourne Gardens, known as Westbourne Park until the late nineteenth century, are gardens on a triangular plot in Westbourne Green, Notting Hill, London, in the City of Westminster. The gardens are open to the public and maintained by the City of Westminster.

== Location ==
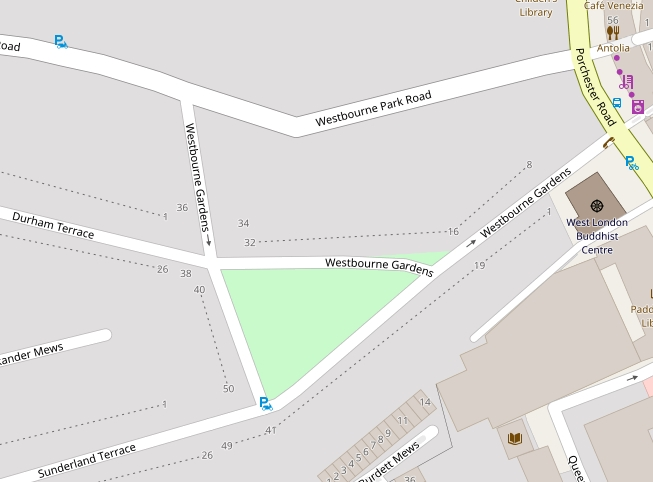
The Westbourne Gardens area

The gardens are surrounded by terraces of Georgian townhouses also known as Westbourne Gardens which continue north to Westbourne Park Road, east to Porchester Road, south to Sunderland Terrace, and west to Durham Terrace.

== History ==
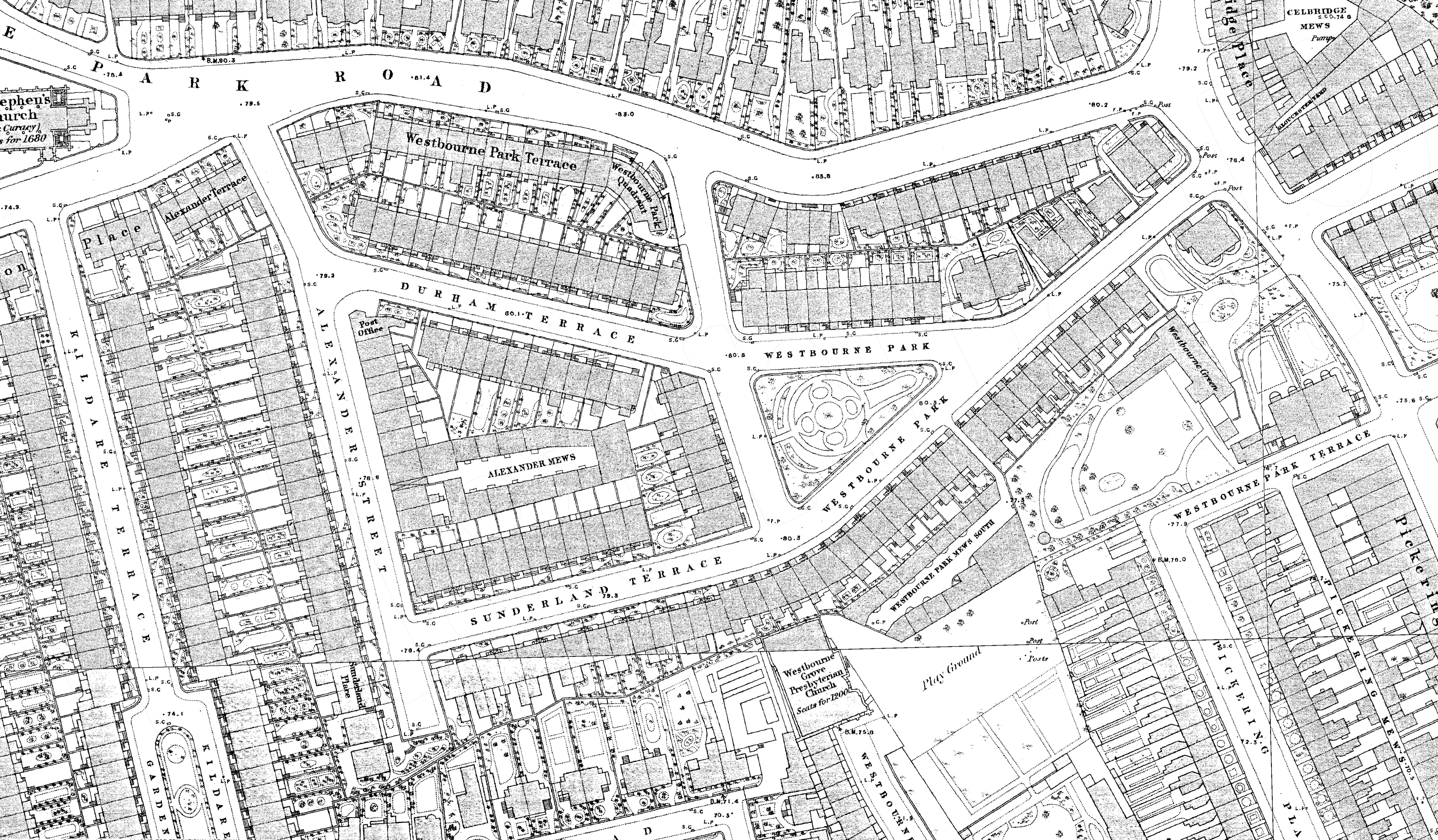
Westbourne Park on an 1870s Ordnance Survey map.

Westbourne Gardens is one of eleven streets in the Westbourne area of Notting Hill named after the River Westbourne that once flowed through the area above ground but was culverted and enclosed in the nineteenth century.

== Former residents ==
- Alexander Tudor-Hart, British communist, lived at 5c in the 1930s.
- Reginald Smith-Rose, physicist, was born at No. 7 in 1894.

The Blackall family [dates to come], lived at No. 47
