= Henry Harben (insurer) =

British pioneer of industrial life assurance

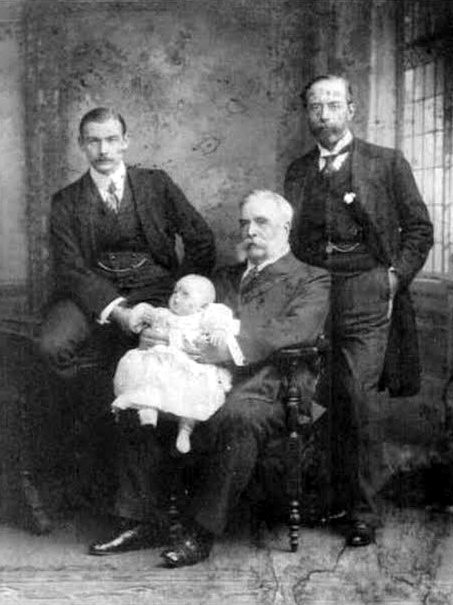
Sir Henry Harben (seated with great-grandson) with his son Henry Andrade Harben (right), and his grandson Henry Devenish Harben (left).

Sir Henry Harben (24 August 1823 – 2 December 1911) was a British pioneer of industrial life assurance.

== Family ==
Harben was the eldest son of Henry Harben of Bloomsbury by his wife Sarah, daughter of Benjamin Andrade. He was first cousin to Joseph Chamberlain. The Harben family was originally engaged in banking at Lewes, but Henry's grandfather was a partner in the provision stores of Harben & Larkin of Whitechapel, London, and his father also carried on a wholesale business in the city.

== Career ==
After a few years in his uncle's stores, Harben was articled to a surveyor, but left that calling in March 1852, when he became accountant of the Prudential Mutual Assurance, Investment and Loan Association. The company was founded in a small way at Blackfriars in 1848 and had met with little success. Harben, who remained connected with the undertaking for sixty years, converted it into a colossal concern. In 1854 the company, mainly on Harben's advice, started a scheme of life assurance for the working classes; the new departure was at first hampered chiefly by the rivalry of the Safety Life Assurance Company, of which Cobden and Bright were directors, but which soon collapsed. Harben was appointed secretary of the Prudential on 26 June 1856, and soon proved that industrial life assurance was practicable. He also organised for the first time the valuation of industrial businesses on scientific principles.

On 24 February 1870 Harben, who had become in 1864 a fellow of the Institute of Actuaries, was appointed actuary of the Prudential company in addition to the secretaryship. On 23 March 1873 he became resident director and secretary, resigning the latter office in the following year. He was made deputy-chairman on 19 December 1878, chairman on 28 December 1905, and president on 31 July 1907. In May 1879 the business was transferred to Holborn Bars, where the large block of buildings accommodated about 2000 clerks, whilst the company's annual income exceeded £14,600,000 and its funds exceeded £77,000,000. Harben's services and advice were to the last available for the company. He presided at the weekly meeting of the board on 13 July 1911, five months before his death.

== Philanthropic, civic and political engagement ==
Harben was a prominent member of the Carpenters' Company, joining the livery in 1878 and serving as master in 1893. Between 1889 and 1897 he gave large sums to assist the company in their various schemes of technical education and social philanthropy. These benefactions included an endowment for technical lectures and a gold medal in connection with the Institute of Public Health. The Convalescent Home for Working Men at Rustington, Littlehampton, the erection and partial endowment of which cost him over £50,000, was founded in 1895 and opened in 1897. It remained under his own management and that of his son during their lives, and then reverted to the Carpenters' Company, which now contributes liberally to its support.

Harben's London house for nearly half a century was at Hampstead, and he keenly interested himself in local affairs. For many years he was a leading member of the Hampstead vestry, and became its chairman. He represented Hampstead on the Metropolitan Board of Works from 1881 to 1889, and from 1889 to 1894 on the London county council. In 1900 he became the first mayor of Hampstead, and was elected for a second year, but resigned owing to failing health. A supporter of the local charities, he built a wing of the Hampstead General Hospital, liberally helped the Mount Vernon Hospital for Consumption and the School for the Blind, and gave 5000l. towards building the Central Public Library. He helped to secure Parliament-hill Fields and Golders Green as open spaces for the public. For the London City Mission he built a hall at Hampstead, and was honorary colonel of the 1st cadet battalion of the royal fusiliers whose headquarters are at Hampstead.

His country seat was Warnham Lodge, near Horsham, where he built the Warnham village hall and club; he was a D.L. of Sussex, and served as high sheriff in 1898. An enthusiast for cricket, he constructed one of the best cricket grounds in Sussex, where important matches were played. A conservative in politics, he contested unsuccessfully Norwich in 1880 and Cardiff in 1885.

He was knighted on Queen Victoria's diamond jubilee in June 1897.

== Death and legacy ==
Harben died at his Sussex residence on 2 December 1911, and was buried at Kensal Green cemetery. A portrait by Norman Macbeth was painted in 1872 for the board-room of the Prudential Company. Another presentation portrait, by John Collier (1889), was in the Hampstead Town Hall. A bust from life was modeled in 1902 by James Nesfield Forsyth.

== Works ==
Harben published:

- The Weight Calculator, 1849; 3rd edit. 1879.
- Mortality Experience of the Prudential Assurance Company, 1867-70, 1871.
- The Discount Guide, Tables for the use of Merchants, Manufacturers … ; new edit. 1876.

== Family ==
Harben married (1) on 1 August 1846 Ann (d. 1883), daughter of James Such, by whom he had issue a son, Henry Andrade Harben, his successor as chairman of the Prudential (1849–1910), whose death in August 1910 was a severe blow; and (2) on 8 November 1890 Mary Jane, daughter of Thomas Bullman Cole. He was survived by a daughter and two grandsons, Henry Devenish Harben and Guy P. Harben the artist.
