= Metropolitan Borough of Paddington =

Former borough of London

Coordinates: 51.52°N 0.19°W

Paddington
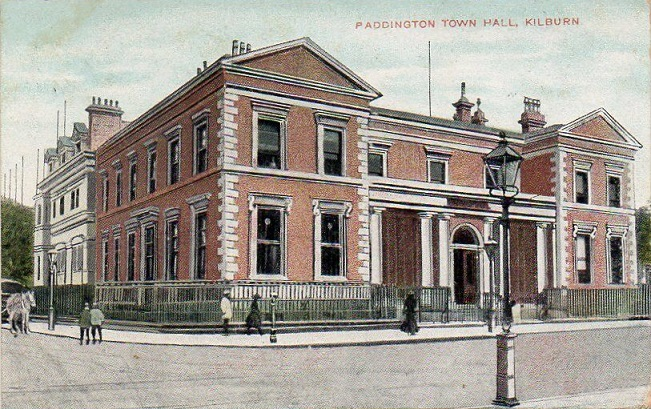
- Paddington Town Hall

- Paddington within the County of London
- Area
  - 1911: 1,356 acres (5.49 km^{2})
  - 1931: 1,357 acres (5.49 km^{2})
  - 1961: 1,355 acres (5.48 km^{2})
- Population
  - 1911: 142,551
  - 1931: 144,923
  - 1961: 116,923
- Density
  - 1911: 105 inhabitants per acre (260/ha)
  - 1931: 107 inhabitants per acre (260/ha)
  - 1961: 86 inhabitants per acre (210/ha)
- History
  - Origin: Ancient parish
  - Abolished: 1965
  - Succeeded by: City of Westminster
- Status: Civil parish (until 1900); Metropolitan borough (1900–1965)
- Government: Paddington Vestry (until 1900, reformed 1855); Paddington Borough Council (1900–1965)
  - HQ: Paddington Town Hall, Harrow Road
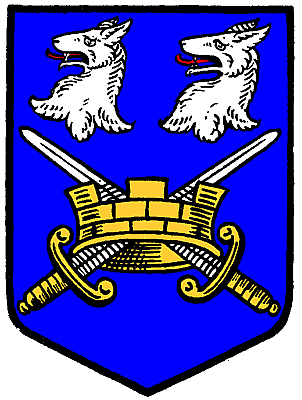
- Coat of arms of Paddington Borough Council
- Map of boundary

Paddington was a civil parish and metropolitan borough in London, England. It was an ancient parish in the county of Middlesex, governed by an administrative vestry. The parish was included in the area of responsibility of the Metropolitan Board of Works in 1855 and became part of the County of London in 1889. The parish of Paddington became a metropolitan borough in 1900, following the London Government Act 1899, with the parish vestry replaced by a borough council. In 1965 the borough was abolished and its former area became part of the City of Westminster in Greater London.

== History ==
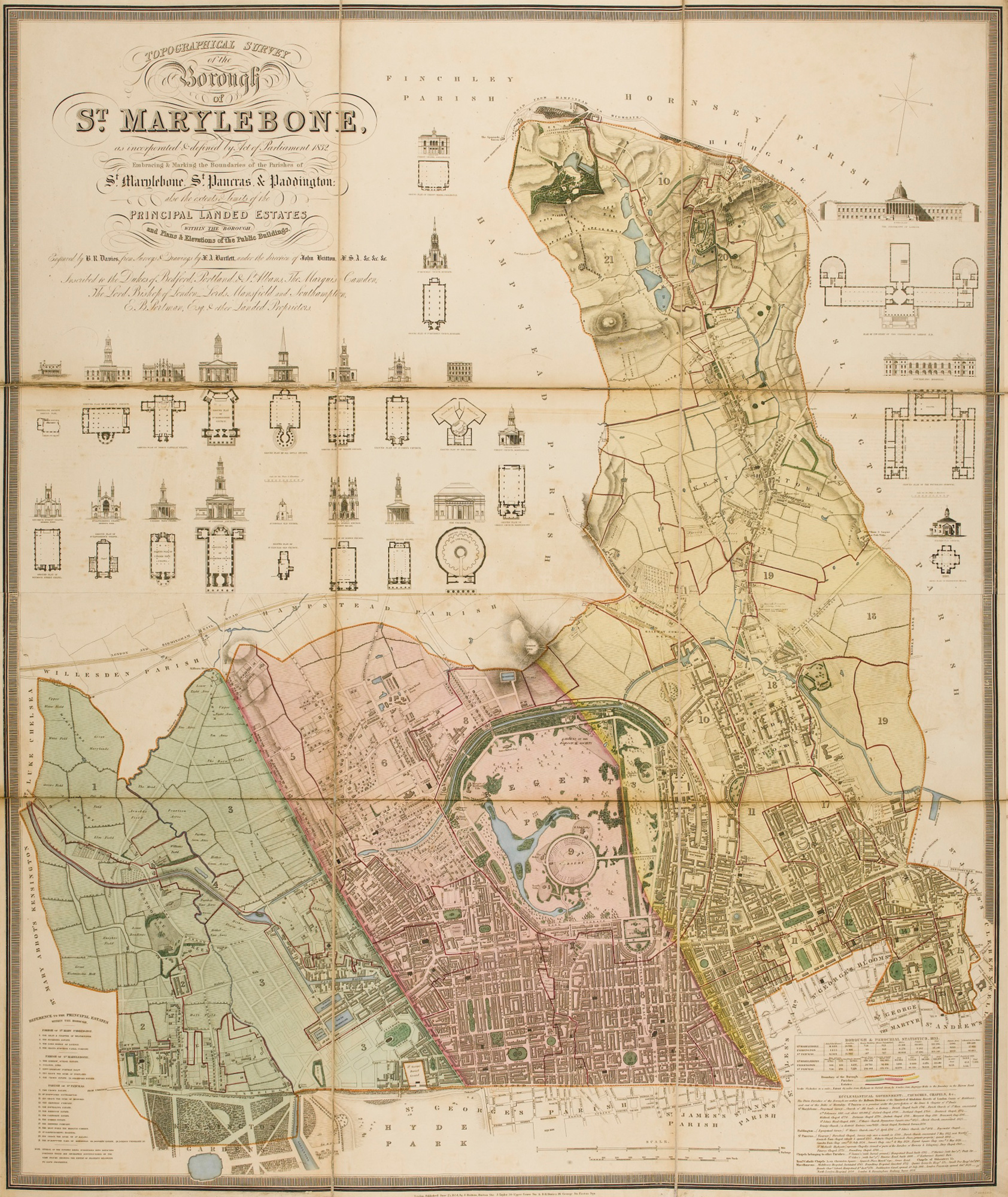
Topographical survey of a Parliamentary Borough shown divided into its other mainstream civic uses, from west to east, into Paddington, St. Marylebone, and St. Pancras Parishes. Engraving by B.R. Davies, 1145 x 950mm, dated 1834, following the better enfranchisement of the area under the Reform Act 1832.

Its area covered that part of the current City of Westminster west of Edgware Road and Maida Vale, and north of Bayswater Road. Places in the borough included Paddington, Westbourne Green, Bayswater, Maida Hill, Queens Park, Kensal Green, West Kilburn, Maida Vale. To the south it bordered the Metropolitan Borough of Westminster, to the east, the Metropolitan Borough of St Marylebone.

The borough was abolished on 1 April 1965 by the London Government Act 1963 and its former area merged with that of the Metropolitan Borough of Westminster and the Metropolitan Borough of St Marylebone to form the present-day City of Westminster.

== Borough council ==
=== Coat of arms ===
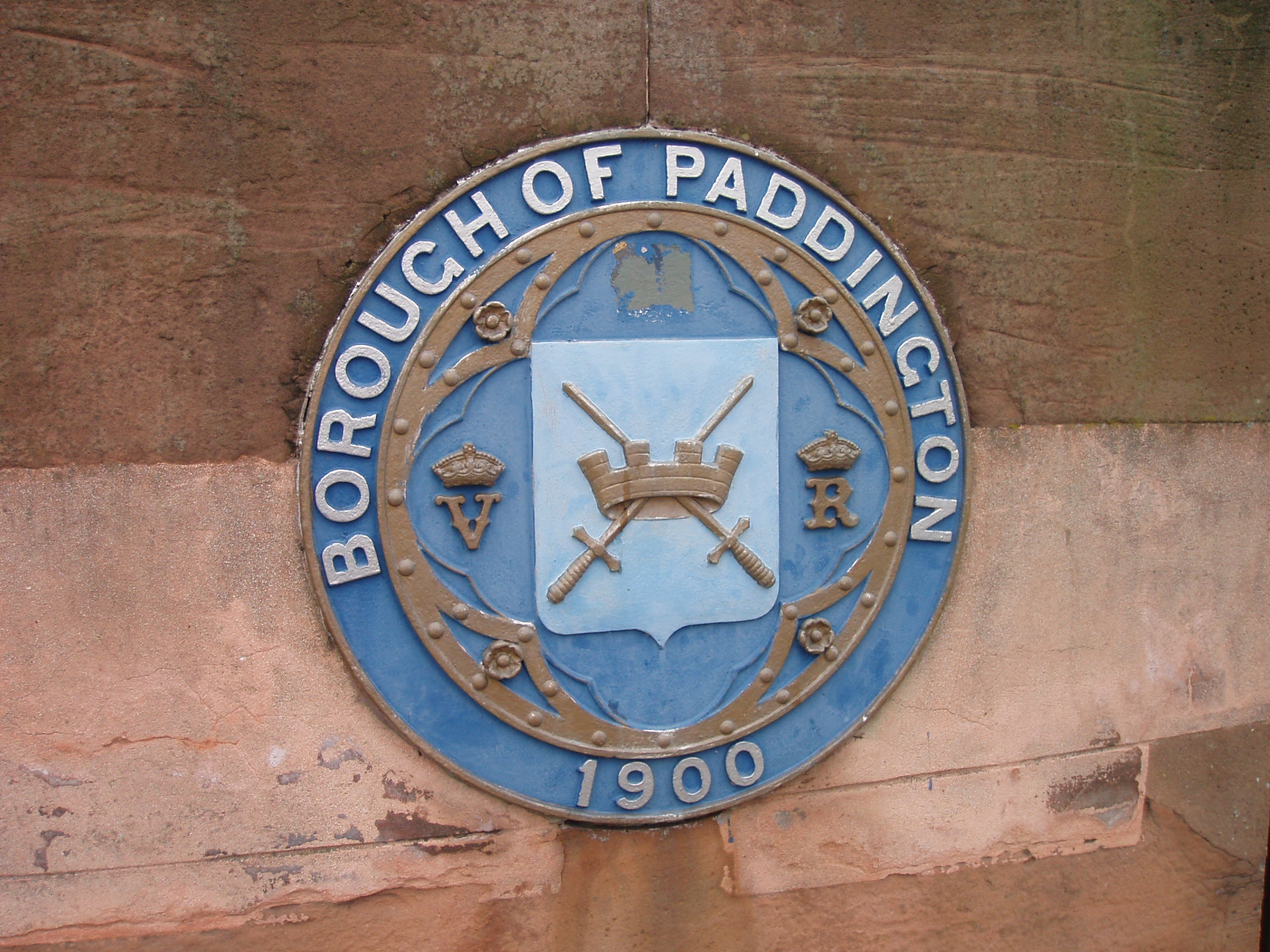
Bridge roundel with the original borough seal and the year 1900, including the VR designation for Queen Victoria

The borough council's coat of arms, granted by the College of Arms on 5 April 1902, was based on the former Paddington vestry seal. The seal featured crossed swords from the arms of the See of London passing through a mural crown, symbol of local government. To these were added the wolves' heads and blue background from the arms of the first Mayor of the Borough, Sir John Aird. Sir John, who was member of parliament for Paddington North, also donated the mayoral badge and chain.

The arms were blazoned as follows:

Azure, two Swords in Saltire proper pommels and hilts Or enfiled with a Mural Crown of the last. Two Wolves heads erased in Chief Argent.

=== Town hall ===
Paddington Town Hall, designed by James Lockyer in the Classical style, dated from 1853. The building, originally the Vestry Hall, was situated on Paddington Green. It was enlarged in 1900 and 1920. Following its closure in 1965, it was demolished to make way for the Westway urban motorway.

== Population and area ==
The area of Paddington Metropolitan Borough was 1,357 acres (5.5 km^{2}), once part of Kensal New Town was added after 1901. The population recorded in the Census was:

Paddington Vestry 1801–1899

Year	1801	1811	1821	1831	1841	1851	1861	1871	1881	1891
Population	1,881	4,609	6,476	14,540	25,173	46,305	75,784	96,813	107,058	117,846

Metropolitan Borough 1900–1961

Year	1901	1911	1921	1931	1941	1951	1961
Population	143,976	142,551	144,261	144,923		125,463	116,923

Note that the population statistics up to 1891 exclude the area of Kensal Town transferred from Chelsea in 1900.

== Politics ==
=== Borough council ===
A map showing the wards of Paddington Metropolitan Borough as they appeared in 1916.

Under the Metropolis Management Act 1855 any parish that exceeded 2,000 ratepayers was to be divided into wards; as such the incorporated vestry of Paddington was divided into four wards (electing vestrymen): No. 1 (12), No. 2 (18), No. 3 (18) and No. 4 (24).

In 1894 as its population had increased the incorporated vestry was re-divided into six wards (electing vestrymen): Harrow Road (12), Maida Vale (9), Church (12), Westbourne (12), Lancaster Gate (15) and Hyde Park (12).

The metropolitan borough was divided into eight wards for elections: Church, Harrow Road, Hyde Park, Lancaster Gate East, Lancaster Gate West, Maida Vale, Queen's Park and Westbourne.

=== Parliament constituency ===
For elections to Parliament, the borough was divided into two and a half constituencies:

- Chelsea
- Paddington North
- Paddington South

In 1918 the borough's representation was reduced to two seats:

- Paddington North
- Paddington South

== Law ==
- Campbell v Paddington Corporation (1911): a legal case arising arising from the Corporation's positioning of a viewing stand for the funeral of King Edward VII, which caused an obstruction and affected the claimant's right to let her rooms for viewing. The claimant was entitled to her lost profits.

== See also ==
- List of mayors of Paddington
