= Henry Devenish Harben =

British barrister and politician

Henry Harben

Henry Devenish Harben (1874 – 18 May 1967) was a British barrister and Liberal Party politician who later joined the Labour Party. He was a notable supporter of women's suffrage.

== Early life ==
He was the son of Henry Andrade Harben and the grandson of Sir Henry Harben who founded Prudential Assurance, Harben was educated at Eton College and Magdalen College, Oxford, before qualifying as a barrister. He married Agnes Helen Bostock in 1899. He stood unsuccessfully for the Conservative Party in Eye at the 1900 general election, but by 1902 had switched his affiliation to the Liberal Party. He stood for the Liberal Party in Worcester at the 1906 general election. Although he lost the election, he petitioned the election court on the grounds that supporters of the winner, George Henry Williamson, had engaged in widespread bribery. He won the case, but the seat was left vacant until a by-election in 1908, and the local Liberal Party adopted a new candidate. Harben next stood in Portsmouth at the December 1910 general election, but came bottom of the poll.

== Fabianism and women's suffrage ==
By 1910, Harben had joined the Fabian Society, which published his pamphlet, "The Endowment of Motherhood". He was elected to the society's executive the following year, and was soon acting as its liaison with Clifford Allen's Inter-University Socialist Federation. Although at the time, Liberal Party members were permitted to hold office in the Fabian Society, it was affiliated to the Labour Party and the position of Liberals was a matter of ongoing debate. Late in 1911 he was selected to be Liberal candidate in the Liberal held seat at Barnstaple, the sitting Liberal MP having decided to contest another seat. Harben was a vocal supporter of women's suffrage, he resigned from the Liberals in 1912, stating that he could not remain a member while the party, he claimed, persecuted suffragettes. Following this, he was appointed to the board of the Daily Herald newspaper, and became treasurer of The Men’s Political Union for Women’s Enfranchisement.

Harben gave both financial and practical support to the Women's Social and Political Union (WSPU) in the run-up to World War I, providing accommodation, at Newland Park for Annie Kenney, Emmeline Pankhurst and Flora Drummond on their releases from prison. He also provided £50 funding annually to Sylvia Pankhurst's East London Federation of Suffragettes. He also began funding labour movement publications, giving enough money to the Daily Herald that it was able to purchase its own printing press and remain open, and being one of a small group who funded the setting up of the New Statesman.

Harben and his wife, Agnes Harben, attended the International Woman Suffrage Alliance conference in 1913. Agnes was active in the WSPU, but left the following year, while Harben left the Men's Political Union, Agnes becoming a founder member of the United Suffragists. Despite this, Harben visited Christabel Pankhurst in Paris to inform her that she could rely on his financial support on matters relating to women's suffrage.

== Later life ==
During the First World War, Harben bought the Hotel Majestic in Paris and converted it into a hospital. He also joined the Labour Party, and stood for it, unsuccessfully, at the 1920 Woodbridge by-election. He retained his friendship with Sylvia Pankhurst, and paid for her son Richard's university education.

The historian, Brian Harrison, conducted a number of interviews related to Harben as part of the Suffrage Interviews project, titled Oral evidence on the suffragette and suffragist movements: the Brian Harrison interviews. Three of these are with Harben’s daughters, two with Naomi Lutyens in March and April 1975, and one with Molly Northey in June 1976. Lutyens and Northey both refer to the separation of their parents, in 1922, and to Harben's mistress, ‘Baby’, who he later married in 1965. Lutyens additionally talks about Harben’s education, politics, activities during both World Wars, relationships with other notable names in the suffrage movement and his friendship with Aldous Huxley. Northey discusses his upbringing, attitudes, role in the family, and family life, including suffragettes staying at Newland Park.

Two interviews with Harben’s secretary, Pauline Hall, in October 1975 are dominated by discussion of his relationship with ‘Baby’ and also mention of Harben’s freemasonry. Finally in December 1976 there is an interview with Jean Gilliland, John Platts-Mills, and his wife, Janet Cree, who were friends of Harben’s through a 1940 World Peace conference. They discuss his politics, wealth and financial support and his involvement with the British-Soviet Friendship Society. This interview mentions an Aldous Huxley novella based on Harben and Baby, which is also referred to in the Lutyens interview as "Chawdron", included in the collection Brief Candles published in 1930.

Harben's son, also Henry Harben, became a first-class cricketer.
