= James Parker Deane =

British lawyer and judge (1812–1902)

Sir James Parker Deane (1812–1902) was an English judge. With Thomas Hutchinson Tristram he was the last of the civilians—the civil lawyers with a training from Doctors' Commons, as described in David Copperfield by Charles Dickens.

== Life ==
Born at Hurst Grove, Berkshire, on 25 June 1812, he was second son of Henry Boyle Deane by his wife Elizabeth, daughter of James Wyborn of Hull House, Shelden, Kent. He went to Winchester School as a colleger in 1824, and matriculated at St John's College, Oxford, on 29 June 1829. In 1833 he obtained a second class in the final classical school and a third in the final mathematical school.

Deane graduated BCL on 28 May 1834, and proceeded DCL on 10 April 1839; he admitted on 2 November that year as a member of the College of Advocates. He had previously, on 8 November 1837, entered as a student the Inner Temple, and on 29 January 1841 he was called to the bar there. He was made a QC on 16 January 1858, and became bencher of his inn in the same year, serving the office of treasurer in 1878.

In 1854 Deane was appointed legal adviser to Admiral Sir Charles Napier commanding the British fleet in the Baltic Sea: he was present on board HMS Duke of Wellington at the bombardment of Bomarsund, and was one of the landing party. On the abolition of Doctors' Commons in 1858 Deane transferred himself to the courts of probate and divorce, where he obtained a large practice, adapting himself to juries and to the examination of witnesses. In the ecclesiastical courts of the period there were few leading cases in which Deane was not retained; noted appearances were Boyd v. Phillpotts, in which the legality of the Exeter reredos was challenged, and of Martin v. the Rev. A. H. Mackonochie, which continued in some form from 1867 to 1882, and in the earlier stages of which he appeared on behalf of the defendant.

Deane was appointed vicar-general of the province and diocese of Canterbury in 1872, on the resignation of Sir Travers Twiss; he had already (in 1868) been made Chancellor of the diocese of Salisbury by the Bishop, Walter Kerr Hamilton. In 1868 he became admiralty advocate-general. He also discharged from 1872 to 1886, as legal adviser to the Foreign Office, the office of Queen's Advocate. In this capacity he prepared the British case in the arbitration between Great Britain and Portugal on the border of Mozambique, over the territory south of what is now Maputo Bay; and he advised the government on the Alabama Claims. Deane was a Conservative in politics, and in the general election 1868 he contested Oxford against Edward Cardwell and William Vernon Harcourt, being heavily defeated.

In 1885 Deane was sworn a member of the Privy Council, and received the honour of knighthood on 1 August in the same year. He held the leading brief in the case of the missing will of the 1st Lord St. Leonards, tried in 1876. He continued to practise at the bar until deafness forced him to retire. On the occasion of the confirmation of Arthur Winnington-Ingram as Bishop of London at Bow Church on 17 April 1901, the turbulent conduct of the "opposers" got beyond his power of control. His last public appearance was at the confirmation of Francis Paget as Bishop of Oxford a few months later; he was then in his ninetieth year.

Deane died at his house in Westbourne Terrace, London on 3 January 1902, having resigned his offices a few days previously. He was buried at Brookwood cemetery.

== Family ==
Deane married his cousin in 1841 Isabella Frances Wyborn (d. 1894), daughter of Bargrave Wyborn. His only surviving son was Henry Bargrave Deane, also a judge. His daughter, Harriet Elizabeth Isabella Deane married Robert Owen Jones.

== Notes ==
Attribution

This article incorporates text from a publication now in the public domain: Lee, Sidney, ed. (1912). "Deane, James Parker". Dictionary of National Biography (2nd supplement). Vol. 1. London: Smith, Elder & Co.
