= Robert Owen Jones =

Major-General Robert Owen Jones (24 November 1837 in Bala – 1926) was a British Army officer and cartographer. He produced maps for the Report of the Boundary Commissioners for England and Wales 1885.

Robert was the son of William and Ann Jones. He married Harriet Elizabeth Isabella Deane, the daughter of James Parker Deane and sister of Henry Bargrave Deane.

The Boundary Commission had been established by the Redistribution of Seats Act 1885 following the Representation of the People Act 1884, with a view to implementing constituencies of more or less equal population. It consisted of six commissioners, two tory government officials, two liberal government officials and two army officers whose expertise was needed to create the maps of the new constituencies. Jones was one of these officers.

== Gallery ==
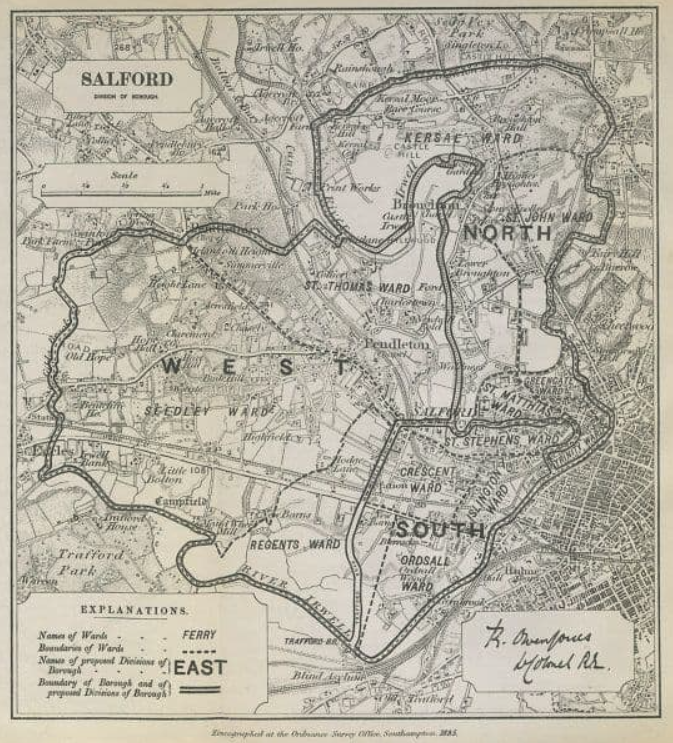
Salford Parliamentary Borough

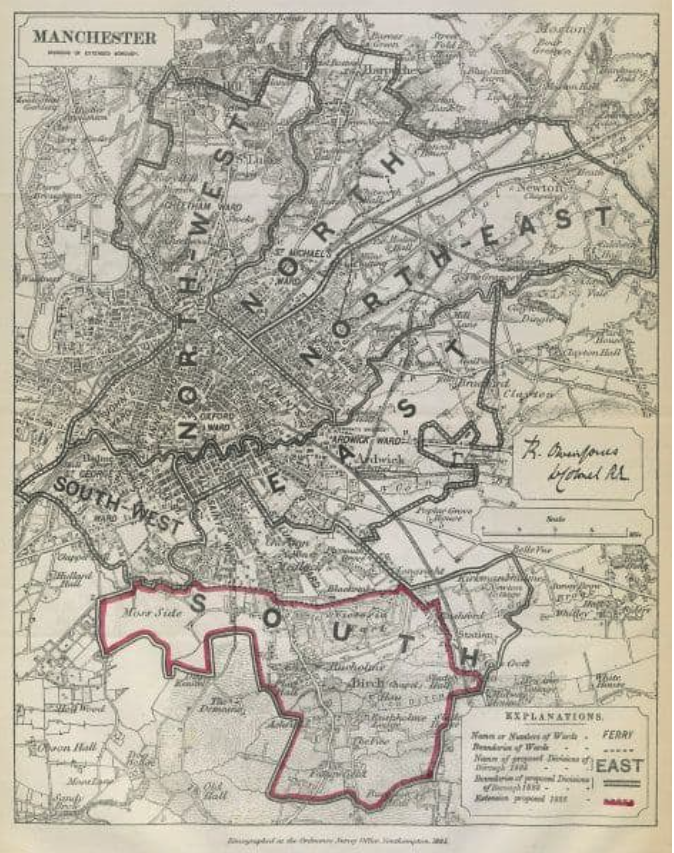
Manchester - Divisions of extended borough
