= Maurice Hill =

Maurice Hill may refer to:

- Maurice Hill (actor) (1918–2007), American actor in the film Bengazi
- Maurice Hill (cricketer) (born 1935), English cricketer
- Maurice Hill (criminal) (born c. 1983), suspect in August 2019 Philadelphia shooting
- Maurice Hill (geophysicist) (1919–1966), British marine geophysicist
- Maurice Hill (judge) (1862–1934), British judge
