= Oscar Clayton =

British surgeon, courtier, and socialite

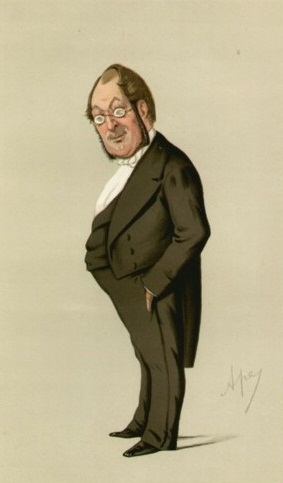
"Fashionable Surgery", a caricature of Clayton by Ape in Vanity Fair magazine, 12 September 1874

Sir Oscar Moore Passey Clayton KCMG CB DL FRCS (10 March 1816 – 27 January 1892) was a British surgeon, courtier, and socialite. He was Surgeon-in-Ordinary to Prince Alfred, Duke of Edinburgh, Extra Surgeon-in-Ordinary to the Prince of Wales (later King Edward VII), and Surgeon to the Metropolitan Police and other bodies.

== Early life and family ==
Clayton was the eldest son of James Clayton, of Bedford Square, Bloomsbury, by his marriage to Caroline Kent, of Kingston upon Thames. The elder Clayton was also a surgeon and in 1835 was elected a Fellow of the Royal Medical and Chirurgical Society of London.

Clayton was educated at Bruce Castle School, University College, London, and the Middlesex Hospital. In 1837 he became a member of the Society of Apothecaries and on 11 May 1838 a member of the Royal College of Surgeons.

His younger brother, Edward Burley Clayton, also became a surgeon. He died in 1851 from severe injuries caused when a horse he was riding in Park Lane collided with a cab. Their father died in 1854.

== Career ==
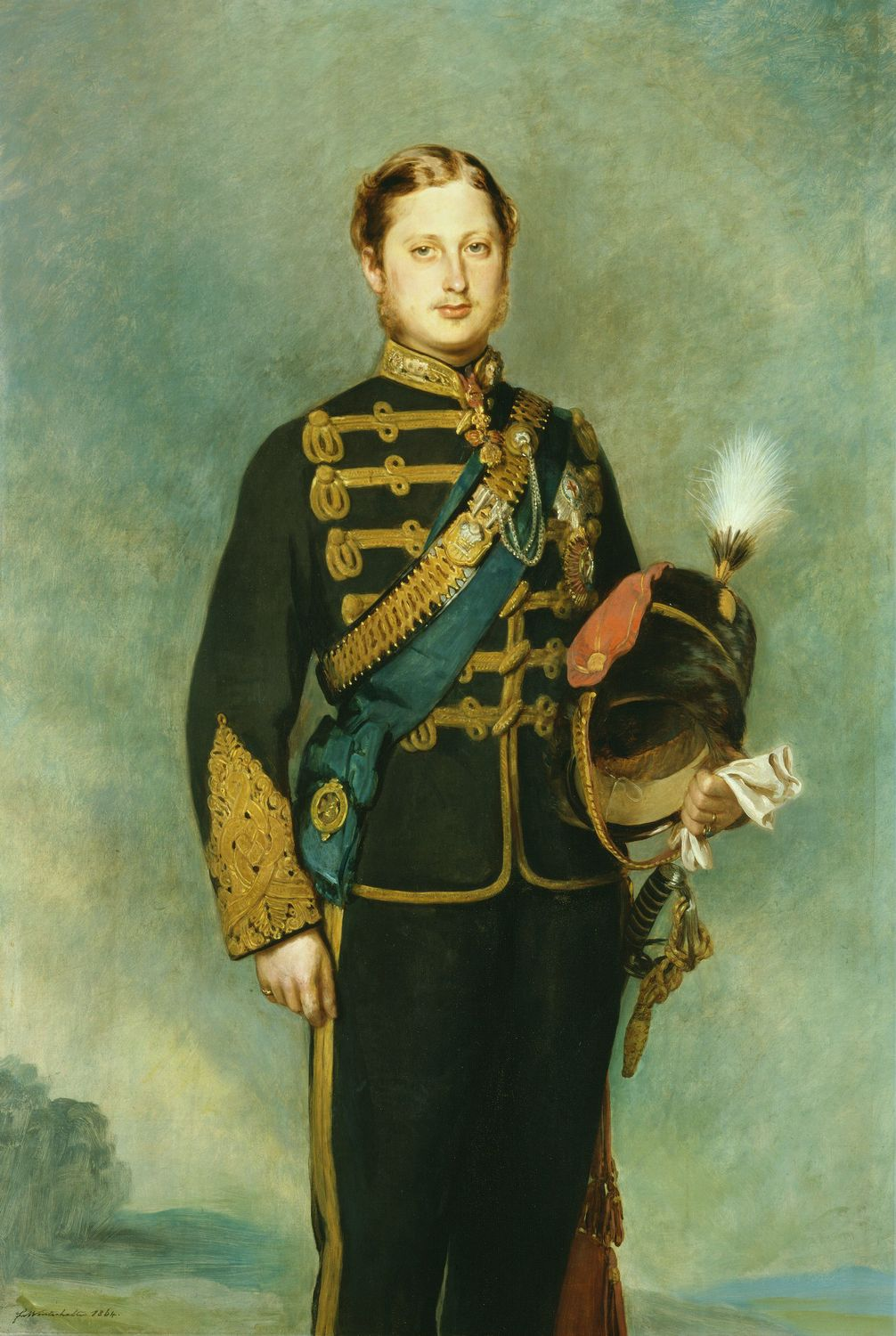
The Prince of Wales in 1864

After completing his medical education, Clayton first practiced from his father's address, 3, Percy Street, off Bedford Square. In 1842 he was elected, like his father, a Fellow of the Royal Medical and Chirurgical Society of London, and on 14 March 1843 read a paper to the Society concerning seventeen cases of a hacking cough which he had observed since 1841 as surgeon to the St Pancras School for Female Children, a charity school at St Pancras, London. This was published in that year's volume of Medico-Chirurgical Transactions under the title Some Account of an Hysterical Affection of the Vocal Apparatus, with several cases.

On 13 October 1853 Clayton was elected a Fellow of the Royal College of Surgeons. He was still at the Percy Street address in 1859, but most of his later years in practice were spent at Number 5, Harley Street. In his middle years he became a "fashionable" society doctor and was the personal physician of two of the sons of Queen Victoria. In 1868, he was appointed as Extra Surgeon-in-Ordinary to the Prince of Wales (later King Edward VII), and Surgeon-in-Ordinary to his brother, Prince Alfred, Duke of Edinburgh. This caused the Medical Press and Circular to comment acidly:

Can their Royal Highnesses be supposed to be jointly moved by a sudden and irrepressible inspiration to place their lives and the succession to the throne of England in the hollow of Dr. Clayton's hand, or is our editorial vision so purblind, and our ear so deaf, that we have all these years been insensible to the brilliant sunburst and the immortal fame of Dr. Clayton's genius? In abject and penitent submission we await the admission of the light, and in helpless obscurity we still puzzle over our enigma. Oscar Clayton, M. D., of a foreign university, Fellow (not by examination) of the Royal College of Surgeons of London, a worthy apothecary and general practitioner, does not seem to us the only eligible occupant of the pinnacle of court favour. Who is it that keeps the second latch-key of the back-stairs wicket of Marlborough House?

Despite the misgivings of the medical press, in 1872 the Prince of Wales fell sick at Scarborough with typhoid fever, and Clayton correctly diagnosed the illness. Clayton was always credited with the Prince's recovery.

Clayton also became Surgeon to the Metropolitan Police, the London Philanthropic Society, and the charity of St George the Martyr, Southwark. His patients included Lord Randolph Churchill, who shortly after the birth of his son Winston made repeated visits to Clayton for "an undisclosed ailment". Frank Harris later claimed that this was syphilis.

In 1885, under the heading A STAR IN THE MEDICAL FIRMAMENT, the Midland Medical Miscellany reported:

The career of Sir Oscar Clayton is an interesting one. He shone suddenly as a star in the medical firmament. We are indebted to a contemporary (a Society journal) for the following item. Such paragraphs are not quite en regle, but there is no help against them. "I am glad to be able to state that the Duchess of Cambridge, thanks to her strong constitution and to Sir Oscar Clayton, is on the road to recovery. There is no doubt that the Queen was greatly concerned on the score of the Duchess's health, and it was whispered 'that the approaching royal visit to the Continent would be postponed in the event of the illness being prolonged'. But both Her Majesty and the Duchess put great faith in Sir Oscar, who, to do him justice, is one of the first medical men of the day, in spite of his exquisitely varnished boots and his aspiration to the juvenility that is not his."

On one occasion, after Clayton had successfully treated Princess Louise, Sir James Reid, Queen Victoria's personal physician, was angry when he heard that Clayton had given the Queen a prescription for her rheumatism. Reid wrote to William Jenner "If he begins that sort of thing, there is no saying where it may end". Clayton hastily responded to Reid to say he had not prescribed for the Queen.

Towards the end of his life, while both were staying with Sydney Stern, Clayton remarked to the American writer Frederick Townsend Martin

Ah, Mr Martin, I should have been far more successful if I had sometimes been able to write cheques instead of prescriptions for my patients... worry kills most people, and want of money is often the root of bodily evil.

== Private life ==
Clayton had a house in Hertfordshire at Grove Cottage, Bushey Heath. Always one who "loved a lord", he was once heard to remark "I've been in luck to-day, I've met no less than seven duchesses!" He attended the Prince of Wales's levée at St James's Palace in May 1867, and at another levée in March 1869, he was presented to Queen Victoria by the Lord Chamberlain, Viscount Sidney.

In 1874, Vanity Fair magazine made Clayton No. 87 in its 'Men of the Day' series, publishing a caricature of him by "Ape" (Carlo Pellegrini) entitled "Fashionable Surgery". Pellegrini's original watercolour is in the National Portrait Gallery, which describes Clayton in its catalogue as "Surgeon and socialite".

In 1880, in a series of sketches called "Our Doctors", Edmund Yates's magazine Time: a Monthly Miscellany published a sketch of a society doctor entitled "Mr Osric Claypole". This piece begins "Gold-rimmed spectacles; hair carefully distributed by the brush... a rosy, healthy face... When Osric Claypole dines out, which he does on every night that he does not entertain at home, he shuffles off the last remnant of the doctoral coil, and is the heartiest and merriest of companions." The sketch also referred to Claypole's "patients of the upper thousand of the upper ten". A few weeks later, The Academy, reviewing the sketch in Time, commented that "Mr. Osric Claypole, with his Louis Seize furniture, his Sèvres, and his "younger Court", might have figured at once in the World as a social "Celebrity at Home". Why not "Mr. Oscar Clayton in Harley Street"?"

In 1890 a portrait of Clayton was painted by Frederick Goodall and exhibited at the Royal Academy. Now in the Hunterian Gallery in Glasgow, this was described in the art journal The Academy:

"Mr. Goodall's portraits include... what is, we believe – strange to say – the first important portrait of Sir Oscar Clayton. The eminent medical practitioner and homme du monde is represented sitting, and leaning, after his wont, somewhat heavily upon his walking stick; and while certainly observing all the time with nothing less than his accustomed shrewdness whatever persons may be in his company, he is engaged at the moment, with evident satisfaction, in telling one of the most genial of his stories."

In his diary for 30 November 1882, the day Clayton was knighted, Lewis Harcourt wrote "Several people went down on the same train to be knighted, among them Oscar Clayton, who is nominally doctor, but really "pimp" to the Prince of Wales".

In a book of memoirs published in 1909, the former actress Lady Bancroft wrote –

I come next to Sir Oscar Clayton, well known in days gone by as a Court Surgeon. We knew him first at Homburg. His dinners at the corner of Harley Street – the house, like many others, has been absorbed by the "flat" octopus – sparkled with good company, but were of the old fashion; a separate choice wine being served with every course, of which there were, also, far too many. It is surely pleasanter to drink one wine throughout and get the best of dinners over quicker than we did.

Clayton died on 27 January 1892. After the probate of his Will, it was found that he had left more than £150,000, which was a substantial fortune in the 1890s, equivalent to £16,477,808 in 2025.

== Honours ==
After being appointed a Companion of the Order of the Bath and of that of St Michael and St George, and also a deputy lieutenant for Middlesex, Clayton was knighted on 30 November 1882. The same year, the University of Erlangen awarded him the degree of Doctor of Medicine. He was also a Knight of the Order of Leopold of Belgium.
