= Lord Randolph Churchill =

British politician (1849–1895)

The Right Honourable Lord Randolph Spencer-Churchill
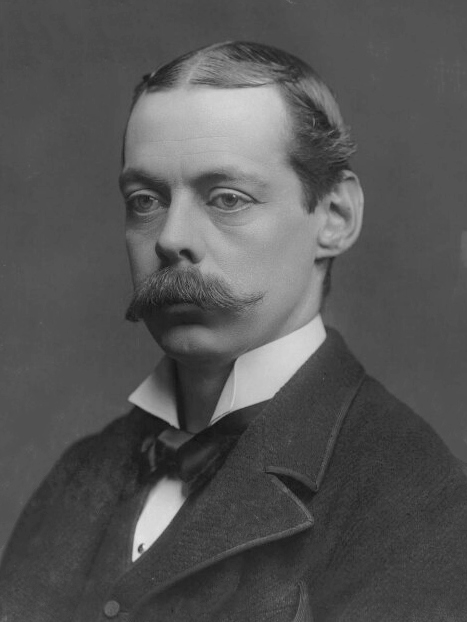
- Churchill in 1883

Chancellor of the Exchequer
- In office 3 August 1886 – 22 December 1886
- Prime Minister: The Marquess of Salisbury
- Preceded by: William Vernon Harcourt
- Succeeded by: George Goschen

Leader of the House of Commons
- In office 3 August 1886 – 14 January 1887
- Prime Minister: The Marquess of Salisbury
- Preceded by: William Ewart Gladstone
- Succeeded by: William Henry Smith

Conservative Leader of the Commons
- In office 3 August 1886 – 14 January 1887
- Overall leader: The Marquess of Salisbury
- Preceded by: The Earl St Aldwyn
- Succeeded by: William Henry Smith

Secretary of State for India
- In office 24 June 1885 – 28 January 1886
- Prime Minister: The Marquess of Salisbury
- Preceded by: The Earl of Kimberley
- Succeeded by: The Earl of Kimberley

Personal details
- Born: Randolph Henry Spencer-Churchill; 13 February 1849 Belgravia, London, England
- Died: 24 January 1895 (aged 45) Westminster, London, England
- Resting place: St Martin's Church, Bladon
- Party: Conservative
- Spouse: Jennie Jerome (m. 1874)
- Children: Winston; Jack
- Parents: John Spencer-Churchill, 7th Duke of Marlborough; Lady Frances Vane
- Education: Cheam School; Eton College
- Alma mater: Merton College, Oxford
- Profession: Politician
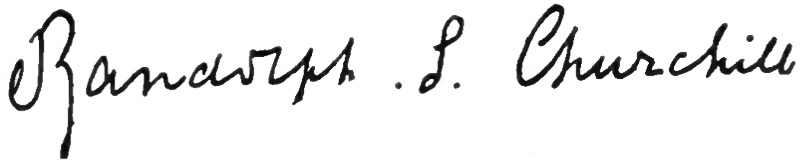
- Signature

Lord Randolph Henry Spencer-Churchill (Note: This British person has the double-barrelled surname Spencer-Churchill, but is known by the surname Churchill.) (13 February 1849 – 24 January 1895) was a British aristocrat and politician. He was a Tory radical who coined the term "Tory democracy" and participated in the creation of the "National Union of the Conservative Party".

Churchill first came to public attention in 1878 as an outspoken exponent of independent Conservatism criticising the old guard and the Conservative front bench. By 1885, he had formulated the policy of progressive Conservatism which was known as "Tory Democracy". In 1884, at the conference of the National Union of Conservative Associations, he was nominated chairman, despite the opposition of parliamentary leaders. He built up Tory Democracy in towns and the Conservatives won the majority of English boroughs in 1885, strengthened by the part he played in events immediately preceding the fall of the Liberal government.

In 1885, he was appointed Secretary of State for India in the Salisbury government. Despite entering office with a reputation for progressive views on India, his tenure was 'traditionally reactionary', many of his policies focused on exploiting India and his attitude towards the native Indians was similarly illiberal. However, he was most known during that time for his unilateral decision to invade and annex Burma in the very costly Third Anglo-Burmese War.

In 1886, Churchill was appointed Chancellor of the Exchequer and Leader of the House of Commons. As chancellor, he attracted both admiration and criticism. He became relatively isolated in the cabinet and tried to use his public support to impose his positions on his colleagues. After proposing a budget that surprised and annoyed his colleagues, he threatened to resign in order to secure his position on armed forces expenditure. To his surprise, the prime minister accepted his resignation – effectively ending his career. For the next few years there was some speculation that he might return to frontline politics, but this did not materialise. His health declined in the 1890s, and he died in early 1895, leaving behind a large personal estate. The elder of his two sons, Winston Churchill, was British prime minister during the Second World War.

== Early life ==
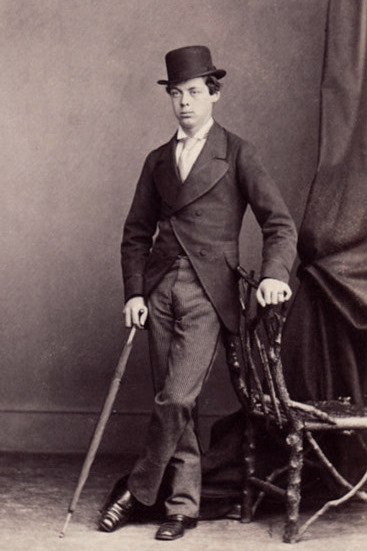
Churchill in the 1860s

Randolph was born at 3 Wilton Terrace, Belgravia, London, the third son of John Spencer-Churchill, Marquess of Blandford, and his wife the Marchioness of Blandford (née Lady Frances Vane). As a younger son of a marquess, Randolph had the courtesy title "lord"; as a commoner, he could sit in the House of Commons. His parents became the (seventh) Duke and Duchess of Marlborough upon the death of Randolph's grandfather in 1857.

Churchill attended Tabor's Preparatory School, Cheam, then from 1863 Eton College, where he remained until 1865. He did not stand out either at academic work or sport while at Eton; his contemporaries described him as a vivacious and rather unruly boy. Among the lifelong friendships he made at school were with Arthur Balfour and Archibald Primrose (later Lord Rosebery).

In October 1867, Churchill matriculated at Merton College, Oxford. At Oxford, Primrose – now with his own courtesy title of Lord Dalmeny – was, along with Churchill, a member of the Bullingdon Club, and joined him at the club's champagne-fuelled parties. Randolph was frequently in trouble with the university authorities for drunkenness, smoking in academic dress, and smashing windows at the Randolph Hotel. His rowdy behaviour was infectious, rubbing off on friends and contemporaries; he gained a reputation as an enfant terrible. He had a liking for hunting, but was also a well-read historian. He took a second in jurisprudence and modern history in 1870.

Churchill experienced no early doubts but made mistakes, as alluded to in Rosebery's biography. He never regretted being an early friend and admirer of the Disraelis. His behaviour was, however, the later cause of dissension in his relations with a colder, more aloof, disciplinarian Salisbury. In 1871, Churchill and his elder brother George were initiated into the rites of Freemasonry, as later his son Winston would be.

At the general election of 1874 Churchill was elected to Parliament as Conservative member for Woodstock, near the family seat of Blenheim Palace, defeating George Brodrick, a Fellow of Merton. His maiden speech, delivered in his first session, prompted compliments from William Harcourt and Benjamin Disraeli, who wrote to the Queen of Churchill's "energy and natural flow".

Churchill was a friend of Nathan Rothschild, 1st Baron Rothschild, and received "extensive loans" from the Rothschilds. He reported on the mining industry in South Africa on their behalf, where their agent Cecil Rhodes was consolidating mining deposits which ultimately led to the creation of De Beers.

== Personal life and medical condition ==
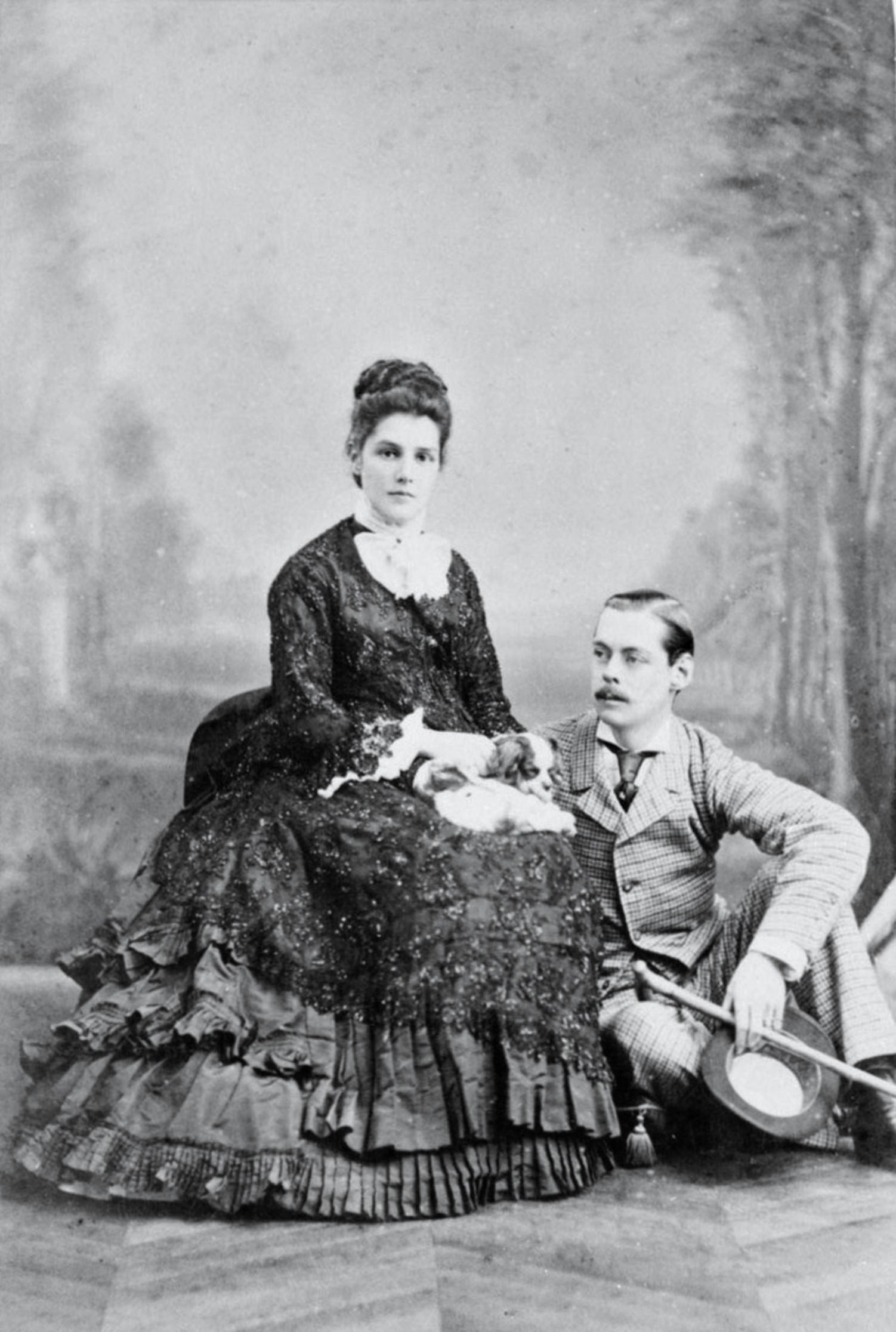
Randolph and Jennie Churchill in Paris (1874). Photo by Georges Penabert.

Churchill was married at the British Embassy in Paris on 15 April 1874 to Jennie Jerome, daughter of Leonard Jerome, an American businessman. The couple had two sons: Winston and Jack.

In January 1875, weeks after Winston's birth, Churchill made repeated visits to Dr Oscar Clayton. He had twenty years to live, but suffered from debilitating illness, particularly in his last decade. Quinault, writing in the Oxford Dictionary of National Biography, theorises that Churchill was probably passing through the stages of secondary syphilis and then tertiary syphilis, but mentions a brain tumour and multiple sclerosis as other possible causes. Whatever the true source of this illness, Churchill was certainly treated for syphilis, and it has been suggested that he may have been suffering from symptoms related to the mercury-based medication which was used in such cases at the time. Clayton was a society doctor and specialist in the treatment of syphilis who worked from his practice at 5 Harley Street. Robson Roose, who was the Churchills' family doctor in the 1880s, had written on syphilis as a root cause of debilitating disease, and subsequently diagnosed it in Churchill's case before referring him to the specialist Thomas Buzzard, and continuing to prescribe potassium iodide and mercury.

According to Frank Harris, who published the allegation in autobiography, My Life and Loves (1922–1927), "Randolph had caught syphilis". He relied on a story by Louis Jennings, an associate of Randolph's who had later fallen out with him. John H. Mather of the National Churchill Library and Center called into question Harris's veracity, and offered the alternative theory of a "left side brain tumour". Mather noted that "[t]here is no indication that Lady Randolph or her sons were infected with syphilis." Additionally, author Richard M. Langworth claims that Roose never actually identified the disease that Randolph was suffering from as syphilis, instead using the term "general paralysis", which in that period "suggested not only syphilis but nervous exhaustion". Langworth also states that there is "no evidence that Roose or Buzzard treated Lord Randolph with mercury or potassium iodide", arguing that "their toxic effects, such as a distinctive grey pallor, would have been evident."

As well as a house in Westminster, Churchill occupied a country house, Banstead Manor, at Cheveley near Newmarket, which he first rented in 1890. In 1891, he had horses in training with J. Ryan at Green Lodge, Newmarket. His wife and sons lived at Banstead while Churchill was away in South Africa during that year.

== Career ==
=== The "Fourth Party" ===
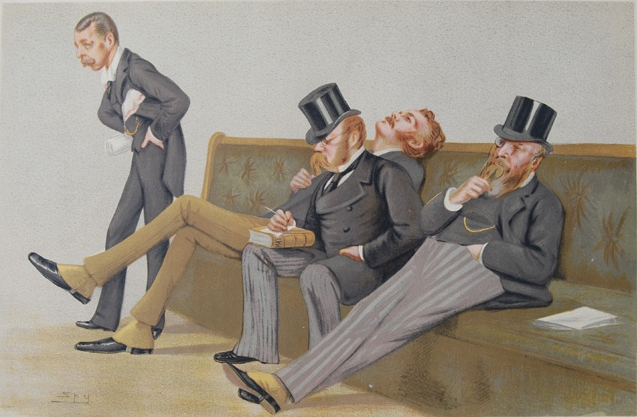
"The Fourth Party": Spencer-Churchill, Balfour, Drummond-Wolff and Gorst as caricatured by Spy (Leslie Ward) in Vanity Fair, 1 December 1880

It was not until 1878 that he came to public notice as the exponent of independent Conservatism. He made a series of furious attacks on Sir Stafford Northcote, R. A. Cross, and other prominent members of the "old gang". George Sclater-Booth (afterwards 1st Baron Basing), President of the Local Government Board, was a specific target, and the minister's County Government Bill was fiercely denounced as the "crowning dishonour to Tory principles", and the "supreme violation of political honesty". Churchill's attitude, and the vituperative fluency of his invective, made him a parliamentary figure of some importance before the dissolution of the 1874 parliament, though he was not yet taken quite seriously, owing to his high-pitched hysterical laugh.

In the new parliament of 1880 he speedily began to play a more notable role. Along with Henry Drummond Wolff, John Gorst and occasionally Arthur Balfour, he made himself known as the audacious opponent of the Liberal administration and the unsparing critic of the Conservative front bench. The "fourth party", as it was nicknamed, at first did little damage to the government, but awakened the opposition from its apathy; Churchill roused the Conservatives by leading resistance to Charles Bradlaugh, the member for Northampton, who as an avowed atheist or agnostic was prepared to take the parliamentary oath only under protest. Stafford Northcote, the Conservative leader in the Lower House, was forced to take a strong line on this difficult question by the energy of the fourth party.

The controversy over Bradlaugh's seat showed that Churchill was a parliamentary champion who added to his audacity much tactical skill and shrewdness. He continued to play a conspicuous part throughout the parliament of 1880–85, targeting William Ewart Gladstone as well as the Conservative front bench, some of whose members, particularly Sir Richard Cross and William Henry Smith, he singled out for attack when they opposed the reduced Army estimates. This would be the ostensible cause for his resignation because Salisbury failed to support his Chancellor in cabinet. They opposed his unionist politics of 'economising' by Tory tradition, making Randolph grow to hate cabinet meetings.

From the beginning of the Egyptian imbroglio, Churchill was emphatically opposed to almost every step taken by the government. He declared that the suppression of Urabi Pasha's rebellion was an error, and the restoration of the khedive's authority a crime. He called Gladstone the "Moloch of Midlothian", for whom torrents of blood had been shed in Africa. He was equally severe on the domestic policy of the administration, and was particularly bitter in his criticism of the Kilmainham Treaty and the rapprochement between the Gladstonians and the Parnellites.

=== Tory Democracy ===
Lord Randolph Churchill

By 1885 he had formulated the policy of progressive Conservatism which was known as "Tory Democracy". He declared that the Conservatives ought to adopt, rather than oppose, popular reforms, and to challenge the claims of the Liberals to pose as champions of the masses. His views were largely accepted by the official Conservative leaders in the treatment of the Gladstonian Representation of the People Act 1884. Churchill insisted that the principle of the bill should be accepted by the opposition, and that resistance should be focused on the refusal of the government to combine with it a scheme of redistribution. The prominent, and on the whole judicious and successful, part he played in the debates on these questions, still further increased his influence with the rank and file of the Conservatives in the constituencies.

At the same time he was actively spreading his gospel of democratic Toryism in a series of platform campaigns. In 1883 and 1884 he went to the radical stronghold of Birmingham, and in the latter year took part in a Conservative garden party at Aston Manor, at which his opponents paid him the compliment of raising a serious riot. He gave constant attention to the party organisation, which had fallen into considerable disorder after 1880, and was an active promoter of the Primrose League, which owed its origin to the inspiration of one of his own "fourth party" colleagues.

=== Central Office and National Union ===
In 1884 progressive Toryism won. At the conference of the National Union of Conservative Associations, Churchill was nominated chairman, despite the opposition of the parliamentary leaders. A split was averted by Churchill's voluntary resignation which he had done his best to engineer; but the episode had confirmed his title to a leading place in the Tory ranks.

He built up Tory Democracy in the towns reinforcing the urban middle classes' part in the party, while simultaneously including a working-class element. His unsuccessful bid for the party leadership was inextricably part of the National Union's attempt to control the party organization. It had originally been founded by Tory peers to organize propaganda to attract working men's votes, registration, choose candidates, conduct elections; associations were linked to provincial unions. Churchill was not the originator but his campaign of 1884 encouraged the leadership to improve on their designs. For the first time since 1832 the Conservatives won in the majority of English boroughs in November 1885.

It was strengthened by the prominent part he played in the events immediately preceding the fall of the Liberal government in 1885; and when Hugh Childers's budget resolutions were defeated by the Conservatives, aided by about half the Parnellites, Churchill's admirers were justified in proclaiming him to have been the "organiser of victory".

=== Secretary of State for India ===
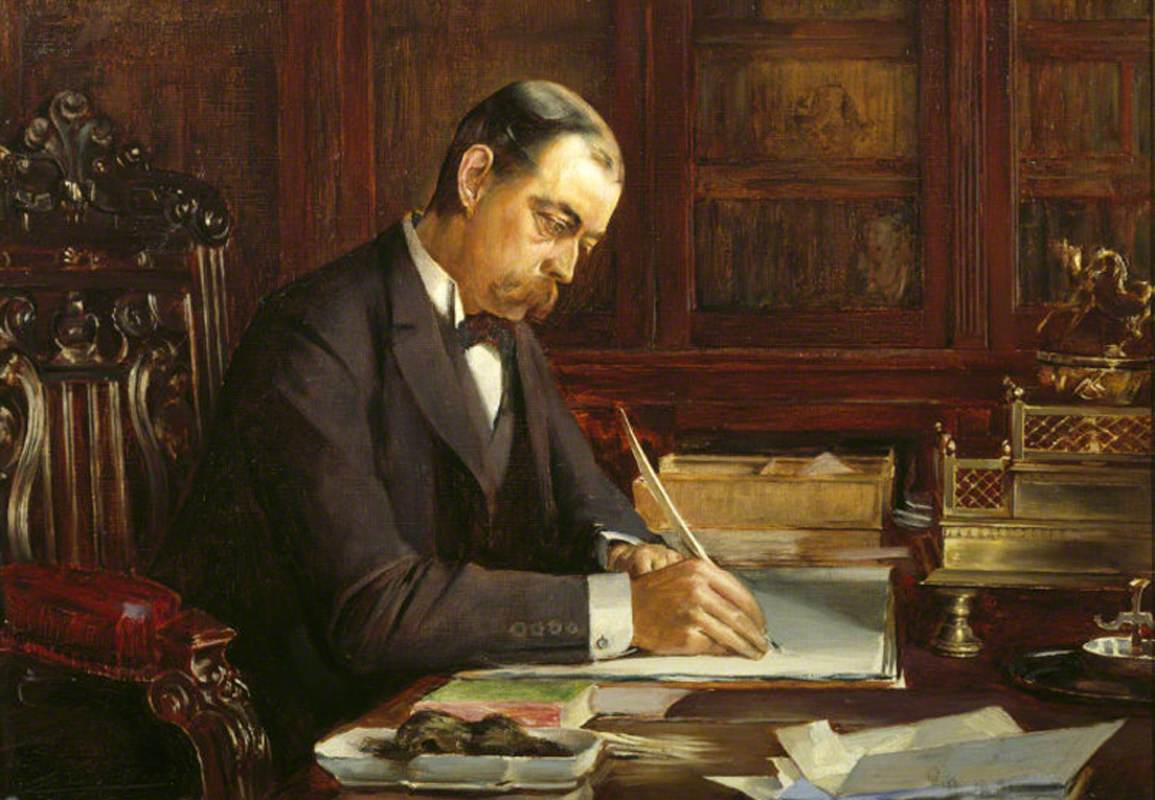
Oil on canvas painting of Churchill by Edwin Arthur Ward (1886)

In Lord Salisbury's "caretaker" cabinet of 1885, Churchill was appointed Secretary of State for India, assuming office on 24 June 1885. As the price of entry he demanded that Sir Stafford Northcote be removed from the Commons, despite being the Conservative leader there. Salisbury was more than willing to concede this, and Northcote went to the Lords as the Earl of Iddlesleigh.

Despite entering office with a reputation for progressive views on India, Churchill's tenure was, in the words of the historian and biographer R. F. Foster, 'traditionally reactionary', and many of his policies focused on exploiting, not developing India. He enthusiastically supported a trade policy which favoured British imports over Indian goods; increased spending on the Indian Army at the expense of public works such as railways, roads and irrigation (all sharply reduced under his secretaryship); and re-directed money which had been set aside for future famine relief to help balance his budget. His attitude towards the native Indians was similarly illiberal. He refused to allow reforms which would have increased Indian representation within the civil service and army, and, in a public speech at Birmingham, he infamously described a deputation to Britain by three Indian politicians, led by N. G. Chandavarkar, as the 'three Bengalee baboos'.

However, Churchill's most well-known act during his time at the India Office was his role in the invasion and annexation of Burma in the Third Anglo-Burmese War. Siding with British commercial (especially cotton) and military interests, and hoping to boost Conservative fortunes in the upcoming general election, Churchill directed the Viceroy, Lord Dufferin, to invade Upper Burma in November 1885. With little discussion, Churchill then decided to annex the Burmese kingdom, adding it as a new province of the Indian Raj as a "New Year present" for Queen Victoria on New Year's Day 1886. Not only is the war itself widely regarded as a piece of blatant imperialism, but the continuing guerrilla war lasted into the later 1880s and cost the Indian taxpayer ten times Churchill's original financial estimates.

In the autumn election of 1885 he contested Birmingham Central against John Bright, and though defeated here, was at the same time returned by a very large majority for South Paddington.

In the contest which arose over William Ewart Gladstone's Home Rule bill, Churchill again bore a conspicuous part, and in the electioneering campaign his activity was only second to that of some of the Liberal Unionists, Lord Hartington, George Goschen and Joseph Chamberlain. He was now the recognised Conservative champion in the Lower Chamber, and when the second Salisbury administration was formed after the general election of 1886 he became Chancellor of the Exchequer and Leader of the House of Commons.

=== Chancellor of the Exchequer ===
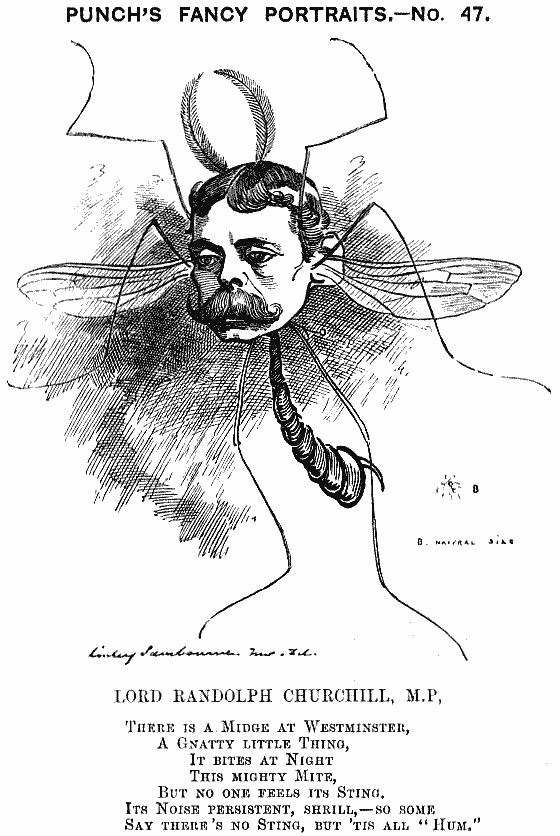
1881 Punch cartoon by Edward Linley Sambourne of Lord Randolph Churchill, M.P., as a "midge with no sting in Parliament."

Churchill's last office was as Chancellor of the Exchequer when the Conservatives returned to office after the 1886 election.

However, he became a relatively isolated figure in the cabinet and did consult his supporters and building a base in Commons; instead, he decided to use public support to impose his positions on the Prime Minister in both domestic and foreign affairs. He decided to demonstrate to the public that the Conservatives could be as economical in budgetary matters as Gladstone had been.

He proposed a budget with expenditure reductions that surprised and annoyed the Conservative MPs. They were willing to compromise, but he insisted on additional cuts in the Army and Navy that alarmed the service ministers.

Churchill decided to threaten resignation but it proved to be one of the great blunders in British political history. In his resignation letter he stated that it was because he was unable as Chancellor to support the armed services. He expected his resignation to be followed by the unconditional surrender of the cabinet, and his restoration to office on his own terms.

To Churchill's surprise, Prime Minister Salisbury accepted the resignation, and Churchill was out in the cold.

Goschen replaced him as Chancellor. For the next few years there was some speculation about a return to front-line politics, but Churchill's own career was over. Even so, his economising ideas survived yet in the "Dartford Programme" of September 1886.

=== After the Chancellorship ===
Churchill continued to sit in Parliament, but his health was in serious decline throughout the 1890s. He was an ardent patron of horse racing; in 1889, his horse, L'Abbesse de Jouarre, won The Oaks. In 1891 he went to South Africa, in search both of health and relaxation. He travelled for some months through Cape Colony, the Transvaal and Rhodesia, making notes on the politics and economics of the countries, shooting lions, and recording his impressions in letters to a London newspaper, which were afterwards republished under the title of Men, Mines and Animals in South Africa. He attacked Gladstone's Second Home Rule Bill for Ireland with energy, and gave fiery pro-Union speeches in Ireland. Referring to the possibility of a Home Rule Bill, Churchill stated that: "...if Gladstone introduced a Home Rule Bill, I should not hesitate, if other circumstances were favourable, to agitate Ulster even to resistance beyond constitutional limits..." During this time he coined the phrase "Ulster will fight, and Ulster will be right", echoing his earlier remark that in opposing Irish Home Rule "the Orange card would be the one to play".

It was soon apparent that Churchill's powers had been undermined by the illness which was to take his life at the age of 45. As the session of 1893 wore on, his speeches lost their old effectiveness. His last speech in the House was delivered in the debate on the East African Scheme in June 1894, and was a painful failure.

== Death ==
Churchill is said to have contracted syphilis from a chambermaid at the family seat of Blenheim Palace shortly after his marriage in 1874.

He attempted a round-the-world journey in the autumn of 1894, accompanied by his wife, but his health soon became so feeble that he was brought back hurriedly from Cairo. He reached England shortly before Christmas, and died in Westminster the next month. The gross value of his personal estate was entered in the Probate Registry at £75,971 (equivalent to £8,600,000 in 2025). He is buried near his wife and sons at St Martin's Church, Bladon, near Woodstock, Oxfordshire.

His widow, Lady Randolph Churchill, married George Cornwallis-West in 1900, when she became known as Mrs George Cornwallis-West. After that marriage was dissolved, she resumed by deed poll her prior married name, Lady Randolph Churchill (Lord Randolph was her husband's courtesy title as the younger son of a duke, and in English law does not qualify as a noble title in its own right). Churchill's son, Winston, died on 24 January 1965, aged 90, exactly 70 years after the death of his father, having lived twice as long.

== Personality and reputation ==
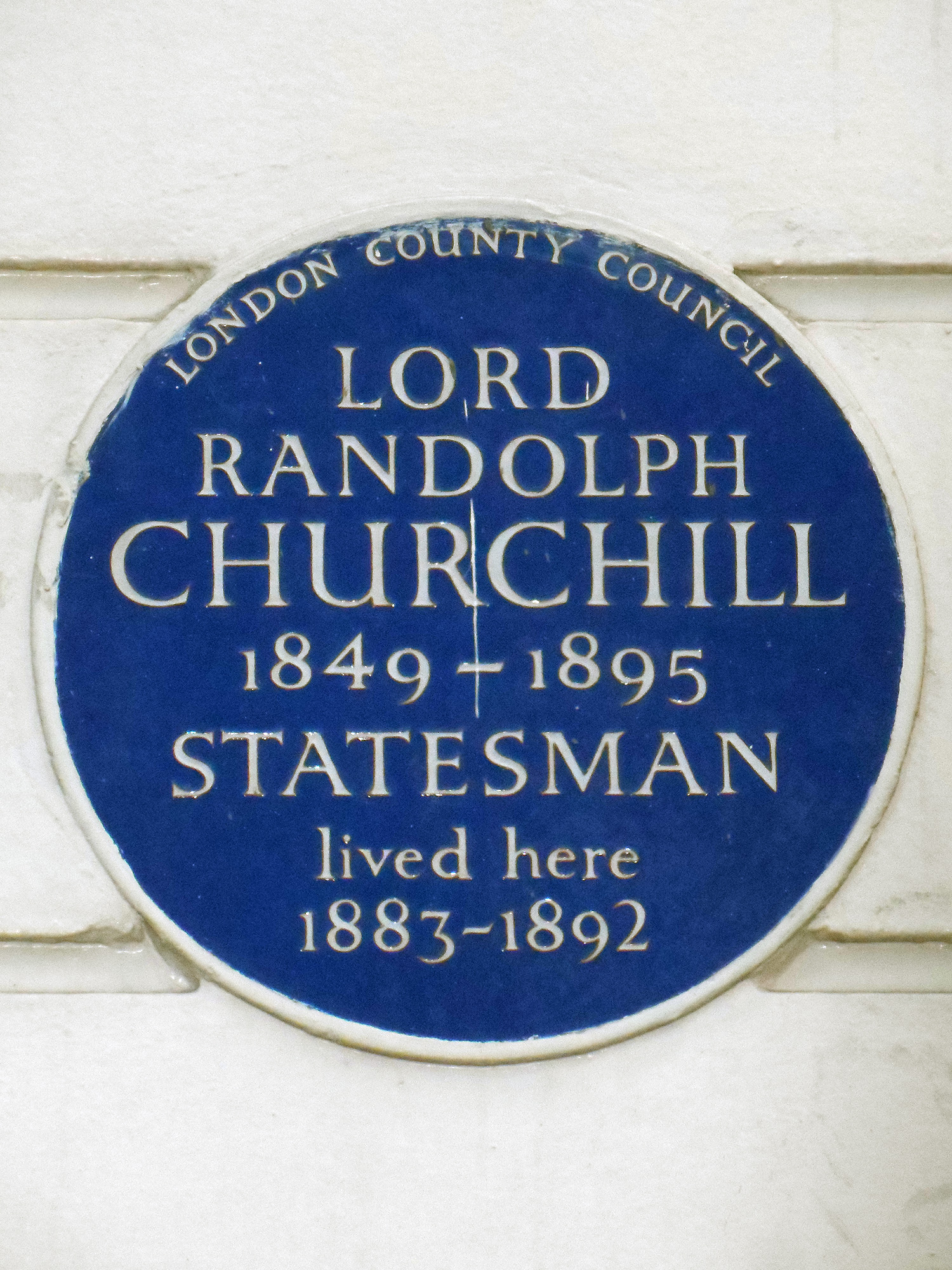
Marker at Lord Churchill's former home

Rosebery described his old friend and political opponent, after his death, thus: "his nervous system was always tense and highly strung; ...he seems to have had no knowledge of men, no consideration of their feelings, no give and take." But he continued, "in congenial society, his conversation was wholly delightful. He would then display his mastery of pleasant irony and banter; for with those playthings he was at his best."

Biographer Roy Jenkins, pointing to his brash and slightly vulgar charisma, asked, "Was he ever near to being a serious statesman?":

Undoubtedly, he had some high political talents. He had a gift for mordant, wounding, sometimes very funny phrases. And, having thought up the most outrageous attack he had the nerve to deliver it, without fear of offending taste or friends or damaging his own repute....He was strong on insolence. He also had other attributes necessary to make his words resound, and his fame increase: a mnemonic name, an idiosyncratic appearance, and good delivery, whether on the platform or in the House of Commons. In addition he had sporadic charm, although intermingled with offensive and often pointless rudeness.

Jenkins compares his youth to that of William Pitt the Younger: "Pitt was Prime Minister for 19 of his 46 years. Churchill had 11 months in office and was without rival in attracting so much attention and achieving so little".

In his biography of Winston Churchill, Jenkins mentions the comment by Lord Salisbury that Randolph Churchill was "the antithesis of Muhammad Ahmad". Salisbury said: "The Mahdi pretends to be half mad, and is very sane in reality".

== Notes ==
Parliament of the United Kingdom
Preceded by Henry Barnett	Member of Parliament for Woodstock; 1874–1885	Succeeded by Francis William Maclean
New constituency	Member of Parliament for Paddington South; 1885–1895	Succeeded by George Fardell
Party political offices
Preceded by Earl Percy	Chairman of the National Union of Conservative and Constitutional Associations (jointly with Sir Michael Hicks Beach, Bt); 1884	Succeeded by Lord Claud Hamilton
Political offices
Preceded by The Earl of Kimberley	Secretary of State for India; 1885–1886	Succeeded by The Earl of Kimberley
Preceded by Sir William Harcourt	Chancellor of the Exchequer; 1886	Succeeded by George Goschen
Preceded by William Gladstone	Leader of the House of Commons; 1886	Succeeded by William Henry Smith
Party political offices
Preceded by Sir Michael Hicks-Beach, Bt	Conservative Leader of the Commons; 1886	Succeeded by William Henry Smith
