= Leonard Hill (physiologist) =

British physiologist (1866–1952)

Sir Leonard Hill FRS
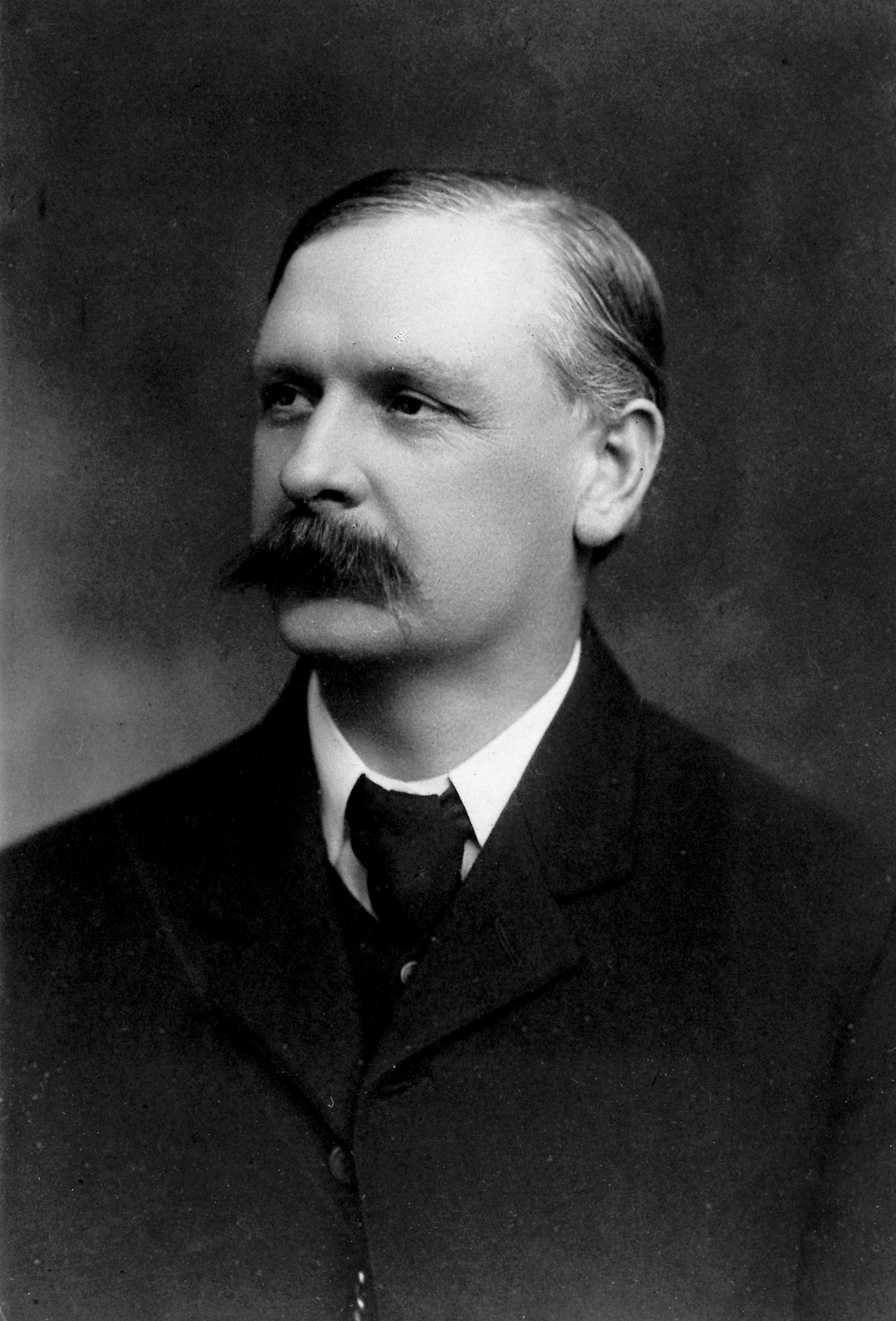
- Sir L.E. Hill. Credit:Wellcome Library
- Born: 2 June 1866; Bruce Castle, Tottenham
- Died: 30 March 1952 (aged 85); Corton, Suffolk
- Education: Haileybury College, University College, London
- Scientific career
- Fields: Medicine, Physiology

Sir Leonard Erskine Hill FRS (2 June 1866, in Bruce Castle, Tottenham – 30 March 1952, in Corton, Suffolk) was a British physiologist. He was elected a Fellow of the Royal Society in 1900 and was knighted in 1930. One of his sons was the epidemiologist and statistician Austin Bradford Hill. His father was George Birkbeck Hill, the famous scholar and commentator on the works of Samuel Johnson, who at the time of his birth was headmaster of Bruce Castle School.

== Education ==
Sir Leonard Erskine Hill attended Haileybury College. He later received his MB from University College, London in 1890. In 1931, he received an honorary LLD from the University of Aberdeen.

== Medicine ==
Hill's work on blood pressure led him to believe "the arterial pressure can be taken in man as rapidly, simply, and accurately as the temperature can be taken with the clinical thermometer". This work developed into the Hill's sign. Hill was the second recipient of the T. K. Sidey Medal, set up by the Royal Society of New Zealand as an award for outstanding scientific research.

Hill was an advocate of light therapy and in 1924 authored Sunshine and Open Air: Their Influence on Health.

== Diving medicine ==
Hill performed research into decompression sickness, oxygen toxicity, and effects of carbon dioxide in diving.

Hill advocated linear or uniform decompression profiles. This type of decompression is used today by saturation divers. His work was financed by Augustus Siebe and the Siebe Gorman Company.

== Personal life ==
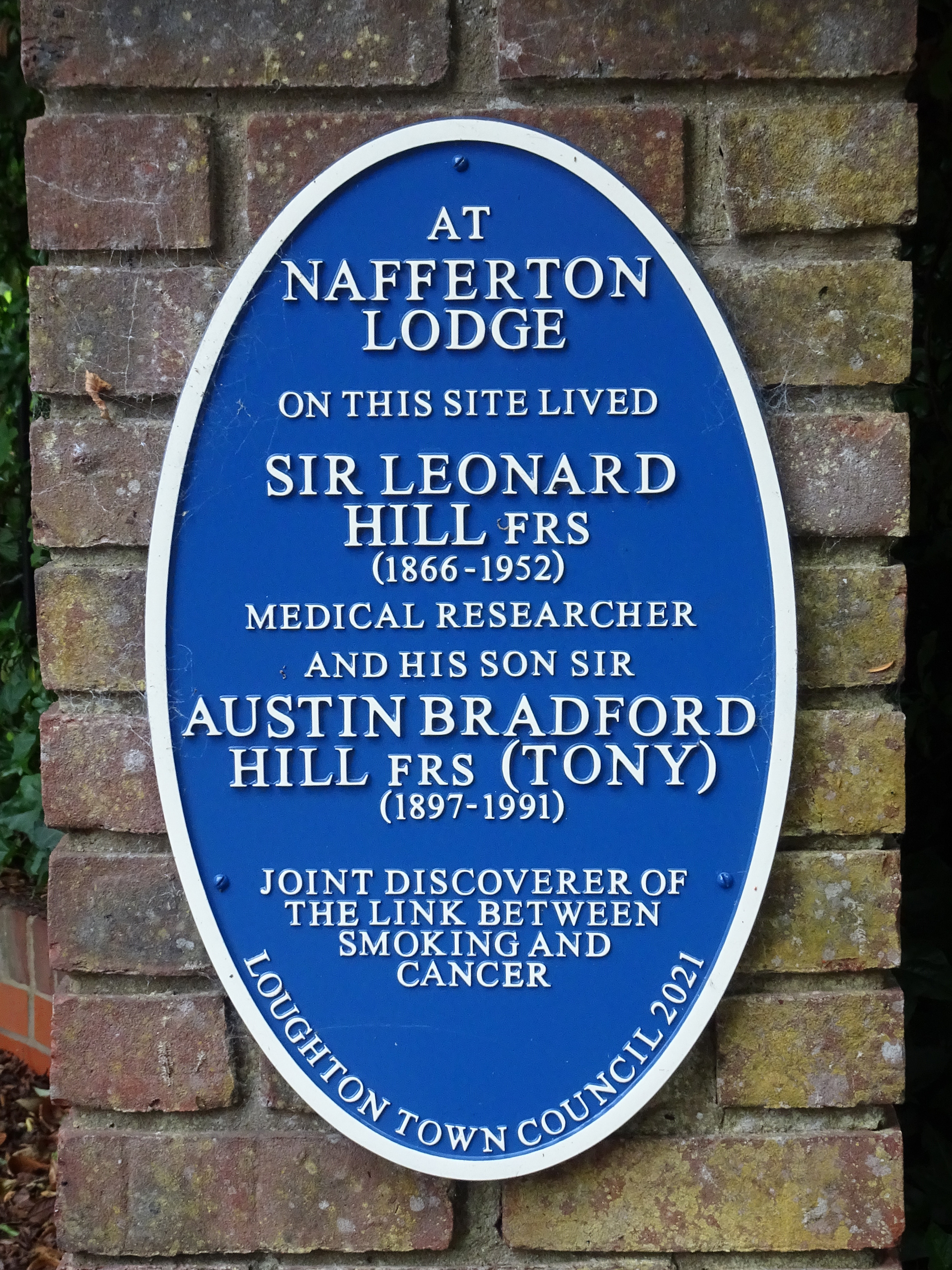
Blue plaque commemorating the family home in Loughton

Hill married Janet Alexander in 1891, and they had six children. In 1904, he took an extended leave of absence due to tuberculosis. Hill died of a cerebral thrombosis in 1952.

Hill was a distinguished watercolourist, and first president of the Medical Art Society. He also wrote children's stories, including The Monkey Moo Book which was published in 1931. He was fond of the outdoor life, and went every day to bathe in a pond in Epping Forest at Loughton where he lived for many years. He retired to Corton in his later years.

== Selected publications ==
- A Textbook of Physiology (with Martin William Flack, 1919)
- The Science of Ventilation and Open Air Treatment (1919)
- Sunshine and Open Air: Their Influence on Health (1924)
- Health and Environment (with Argyll Campbell, 1925)
- Philosophy of a Biologist (1930)
- Manual of Human Physiology (1935)

== See also ==
- Decompression (diving) – Pressure reduction and its effects during ascent from depth
