= Allen George Packwood =

Allen George Packwood OBE FRHistS
- Education: University of Nottingham Sidney Sussex College, Cambridge
- Occupation: Director of the Churchill Archives Centre
- Years active: 2002 to Present
- Notable work: How Churchill Waged War

Allen George Packwood OBE FRHistS is the Director of the Churchill Archives Centre (CAC) at Churchill College, University of Cambridge.

== Education ==
Packwood received a Bachelor of Arts from the University of Nottingham before going on to earn an MPhil from Sidney Sussex College, Cambridge in 1989.

== Career ==
A qualified archivist, Packwood began his career at the Churchill Archives Centre in September 1995. In 2001, he succeeded Piers Brendon as Acting Keeper of the Archives, and in 2002, the college appointed him to the permanent role as Director.

During his tenure as Director of the Churchill Archives Centre, Packwood co-curated several highly successful exhibitions on Sir Winston Churchill. In 2004, he helped to develop an exhibition with the U.S. Library of Congress entitled ‘Churchill and the Great Republic', which ran from February through July. In 2012, in collaboration with the Morgan Library in New York, ‘Churchill: The Power of Words’, presented interactive exhibits that included documents on loan from the Centre. The exhibition ran from June to September of that year.

He also helped to organise Churchill 2015, a programme of events commemorating the fiftieth anniversary of Sir Winston’s death, and was successful in getting the Churchill archive inscribed on the UNESCO international register for the Memory of the World.

Packwood was also Executive Director of the International Churchill Society (UK) from 2012 to 2015 and he formerly served as a Trustee on the board of the International Churchill Society.

In addition to his work at the archive, Packwood has lectured extensively on Churchill in the United Kingdom and the United States and accompanied Celia Sandys and Lady Soames as an expert on a 'Chasing Churchill' Mediterranean Cruise.

== Awards ==
He is a Fellow of Churchill College and the Royal Historical Society.

In the 2016 Queen's Birthday Honours List, he was awarded the OBE (Officer of the Order of the British Empire) for his exemplary services to Archives and Scholarship.

== Publications ==
- How Churchill Waged War, Frontline Books, London 2018. ISBN 978-1473893894
