= NCLC =

NCLC may refer to:

- National Churchill Library and Center, a research library in Washington, D.C.
- National Child Labor Committee - in the United States.
- National Council of Labour Colleges, former organisation in the UK
- National Caucus of Labor Committees, a political organization associated with Lyndon LaRouche
- National Consumer Law Center
