= Churchill Archives Centre =

University of Cambridge document repository

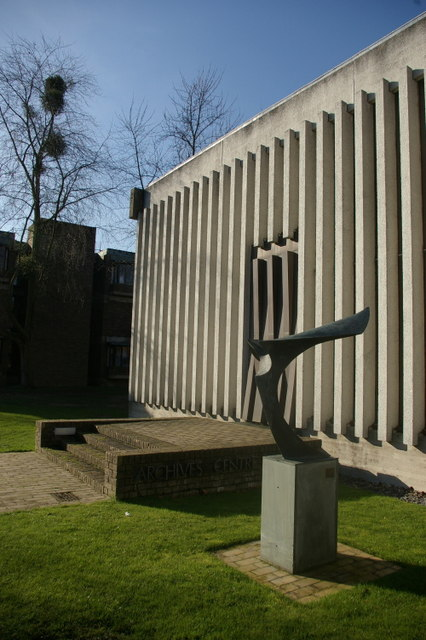
- 52°12′48″N 0°6′7″E
- Location: Churchill College, Cambridge, England
- Type: Archive and research library
- Scope: Papers of Winston Churchill and other politicians
- Established: 1973

Other information
- Director: Allen George Packwood OBE
- Website: https://archives.chu.cam.ac.uk/

The Churchill Archives Centre (CAC) at Churchill College at the University of Cambridge is one of the largest repositories in the United Kingdom for the preservation and study of modern personal papers. It is best known for housing the papers of former British prime minister Winston Churchill.

In addition to housing the personal papers of Churchill, the centre also houses the private papers of other notable figures, including former British prime ministers Baroness Thatcher, Ernest Bevin, Enoch Powell, Lord Kinnock, Sir John Colville, Lord Hankey, Admiral Lord Fisher, Field Marshal Lord Slim, Sir John Cockcroft, Sir James Chadwick, Professor Lise Meitner, Rosalind Franklin, and Sir Frank Whittle.

The college as a whole is the national and Commonwealth memorial to Winston Churchill and the Archive Centre has been awarded designated status by the Museums, Libraries and Archives Council. Since 2015 the Churchill archive has been on UNESCO's Memory of the World Register.

The centre is open to the public. Its mission is to preserve the collections in its care for future generations and make them as accessible as possible.

== Holdings ==
=== Collections ===
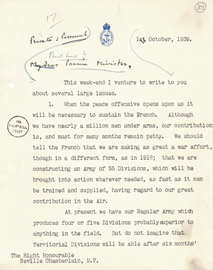
Letter by Winston Churchill

Although it is Sir Winston Churchill who give the Archives Centre its name, this institution houses nearly 600 collections containing records of the lives of soldiers, sailors, airmen, journalists, reformers and activists, public servants, diplomats, physicists, chemists, biologists and their families.

=== Subjects ===
The wide range of the collections allows the exploration of a similarly wide range of subjects. For example, most aspects of the Second World War can be traced there, and records relating to the birth (with Churchill’s so-called Iron Curtain Speech) and death of the Cold War are stored in CAC archival boxes.

The CAC provides a valuable resource for the study of military, political and diplomatic history, and international relations, social and cultural history and the history of colonialism, labour, science, and women, particularly in a British context. There are letters, photographs, diaries and scrapbooks from families, public figures and the general public.

=== Types of documents ===
The collections at the Churchill Archives Centre include speeches, memoranda, reports, minutes, letters, postcards, diaries, appointment books, telegrams and memoirs, diagrams, maps, sketches and doodles, audio and video recordings, and photographs. The Archives Centre attempts to preserve these whilst rendering them accessible to the public. Among the figures, events and broader topics included in CAC's holdings are:

==== People ====
Politicians	Scientists	Diplomats and Civil Servants	Military and Intelligence	Various
Winston Churchill	Frank Whittle	Nicholas O'Conor	Alexander Denniston	Clementine Churchill
Margaret Thatcher	Lise Meitner	Percy James Grigg	Jackie Fisher	William Deakin
Enoch Powell	John Cockcroft	Alexander Cadogan	William Slim	William Thomas Stead
Florence Horsbrugh	James Chadwick	Jock Colville	William Reginald Hall	
Maurice Hankey	Rosalind Franklin	William Harold Ingram		
Ernest Bevin	Martin Ryle	Cecil Spring Rice		
Neil Kinnock		Alan "Tommy" Lascelles		
Clement Attlee				

==== Events and broader topics ====
Political	Scientific	Military	Various
Appeasement	Jet Engine	Yalta Conference	Eliza Armstrong case
UK General Strike of 1926	Nuclear Fission	Battle of Gallipoli	Campaign for Nuclear Disarmament
Iron Curtain			

== Access ==
The Churchill Archives Centre is open to the public, though appointments must be made in advance to guarantee a place in the Reading Room. The aim of the Centre is to open up as much material for research as possible, but there may be closures for conservation or other reasons.

In 2023, to mark 50 years of the centre, an Access Portal was introduced providing online access to some of the collections.

== Preservation ==
A core policy of the Centre is to preserve archival material as far as possible for the use of present and future generations, recognising that some collections are used very heavily and others contain badly damaged items. Although most of the archive material is in the form of loose papers, it also includes large photograph albums, posters and plans, cine film, and artifacts such as one of Margaret Thatcher’s handbags. Only a small proportion of the papers are significantly damaged, but they need attention to make them usable. Many need intervention to render them chemically stable for long-term preservation. Sometimes the damage is extremely disfiguring and dramatic.

Conservation staff at the Centre undertake the following treatments to conserve damaged archive material:

- Surface dry cleaning to remove abrasive, oily and acidic dirt;
- Relaxation and flattening of creased and warped items;
- Washing out acids or impurities from paper and photographs to stabilize them chemically;
- De-acidification of acidic and brittle papers and the addition of alkaline "buffers";
- Repairs to tears and weak areas using fine, acid-free tissues and papers and reversible adhesives;
- Removal of pressure-sensitive tapes, mounts, and other things that can cause damage over time;
- Stabilization of mouldy material;
- Housing in conservation bindings.

Key to preserving the archives is the specially equipped storage facility or strongroom, which features a sophisticated fire detection system and suppresses fire using a mixture of inert Inergen gases. The strongroom is monitored for insect pests and provides a stable, cool, and relatively dry environment with clean, filtered air.

The archives themselves are stored in protective packages made from high-quality, acid-free (alkaline buffered) paper and card, and sometimes inert polyester film. This provides both physical protection and a safe, non-acidic environment. Sturdy boxes are used to further shield files from light, dust, and disaster.

To maintain the physical integrity of the archives, all staff, visitors and readers are instructed on their correct handling, and the exhibition of original material is strictly controlled.

== History ==
Churchill College began to collect papers in 1965, beginning with those of Clement Attlee. The Archives Centre was purpose-built in 1973 to house the papers of Winston Churchill. His papers relating to his life after 1945 were given to the college by his wife, but those concerning his life before 1945 remained in family ownership (though housed in the Archives Centre) until 1995, when they were bought for the nation. The grant to purchase the papers included funding for a dedicated team of archivists to catalogue them. The catalogue took a team of five archivists five years to complete. It was finished at the end of 2000 and was made available online 12 months later. More recently, the Churchill Papers have been digitised.

The Centre continued to collect personal papers from other figures from the fields of politics, the military, diplomacy, technology and science. By the end of the 20th century it was running out of storage space. In 1997, when Margaret Thatcher gave her papers to the Centre, funding was raised to build a new wing to house them and to enable the Centre to continue adding to its collections in the 21st century.

The Archives Centre has collaborated with organisations around the world on projects and exhibitions about Winston Churchill. A joint exhibition was held with the Library of Congress. In 2006, catalogues to all the collections except those of Churchill and Thatcher were made available on the Cambridge-based Janus webserver.

The Directors of the Archives Centre have been as follows:

- Correlli Barnett, 1977–1995
- Piers Brendon, 1995–2001
- Allen George Packwood, 2001–Present.

To learn more about the history of Churchill Archives Centre, see an online exhibition published to mark the 50th Anniversary of the Centre.

== See also ==
- Churchill War Rooms in Westminster
- The Churchill Centre and Churchill Museum at the War Rooms
- Chartwell – Churchill's family home, now administered by the National Trust
