= Medical Art Society =

Organization in Britain for medical professionals

The Medical Art Society (MAS) is a British society for doctors, dentists and veterinary surgeons who draw, paint and sculpt. It was established in 1934 by a group of doctors, including the plastic surgeon Sir Harold Gillies and the physiologist Sir Leonard Hill.
