= Fourth Party =

Group of politicians in XIX cent. United Kingdom

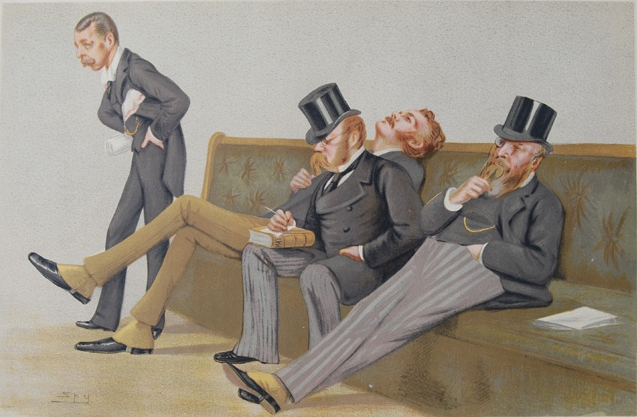
"The Fourth Party" Churchill, Balfour, Drummond-Wolff and Gorst as caricatured by Spy (Leslie Ward) in Vanity Fair, December 1880

The Fourth Party was an informal label given to four British MPs, Lord Randolph Churchill, Henry Drummond Wolff, John Gorst and Arthur Balfour, who gained national attention by acting together in the 1880–1885 parliament. They attacked what they saw as the weakness of both the Liberal government and the Conservative opposition. They were all backbench members of the Conservative Party. The Fourth Party seized upon the Bradlaugh affair, expressing time and again the outrage felt by many Conservatives for Gladstone allowing an avowed atheist to sit in Parliament. They had the support of two thirds of the Conservative MPs The Fourth Party also vigorously assaulted Gladstone regarding the Irish Land Bill of 1881.

According to the report in The New York Times, they would "act as skirmishers to the main body, popping out here and there to fire a shot at the Government and being ostensibly rebuked but really supported by the Conservative leaders."

The later Conservative Party faction known as the Hughligans was "a self-conscious attempt to recreate the 'Fourth Party'", according to Rhodri Williams.
