= Saturday Review (London newspaper) =

British weekly magazine (1855–1936)

The Saturday Review of Politics, Literature, Science, and Art was a London weekly newspaper established by A. J. B. Beresford Hope in 1855.

The first editor was the Morning Chronicle's ex-editor John Douglas Cook (1808?–1868), and many of the earlier contributors had worked on the Chronicle. Cook was a Scotsman who had lived in India: he had a house in Tintagel, Cornwall, and is buried there. A stained-glass window in the parish church commemorates him. The political stance of the Saturday Review was Peelite liberal Conservatism. The paper, benefiting from the recent repeal of the Stamp Act, aimed to combat the political influence of The Times. The first issue appeared on 3 November 1855.

Frank Harris was editor from 1894 to 1898.

Contributors included Dorothy Richardson, Lady Emilia Dilke, Anthony Trollope, H. G. Wells, George Bernard Shaw, Eneas Sweetland Dallas, Max Beerbohm, Walter Bagehot, James Fitzjames Stephen, Charles Kingsley, Max Müller, Guy Thorne, George Birkbeck Hill, Dante Gabriel Rossetti, Oscar Wilde and future Prime Minister Lord Salisbury.

== Germania est delenda ==
In the 1890s, the magazine published several articles that expressed an anti-German sentiment, summed up in the quote Germania est delenda (Germany needs to be destroyed) which was modeled after Cato's "Carthago delenda est" (Ceterum censeo Carthaginem esse delendam).

Our chief rival in trade and commerce today is not France but Germany. In case of a war with Germany, we should stand to win much and lose nothing; whereas, in case of a war with France, no matter what the outcome might be, we are sure to lose heavily.

— 'Our True Foreign Policy', Saturday Review, 24 August 1895, p.17.

The biological view of foreign policy is plain. First, federate our colonies and prevent geographical isolation turning the Anglo-Saxon race against itself. Second, be ready to fight Germany, as Germania est delenda; (Germany must be destroyed) third, be ready to fight America when the time comes. Lastly, engage in no wasting wars against peoples from whom we have nothing to fear.

— 'A Biological View of Our Foreign Policy'

Three years ago when the Saturday Review began to write against the traditional pro-German policy of England, its point of view made it isolated among leading organs of opinion. When, in February 1896, one of our writers, discussing the European Situation, declared Germany the first and immediate enemy of England, the opinion passed as an individual eccentricity. ... What Bismarck realized, and what we too may soon come to see, is that not only is there the most real conflict of interests between England and Germany, but that England is the only Great Power who could fight Germany without tremendous risk and without doubt of the issue. ... Our work over, we need not even be at the pains to alter Bismarck's words, and to say to France and Russia: Seek some compensation. Take inside Germany whatever you like: you can have it.

— 'England and Germany', Saturday Review, 11, 1897, p.17

== Later years ==
Gerald Barry became editor in 1924. He resigned in 1930, refusing an order from the board of directors to support the United Empire Party; his last issue roundly condemned the new party, while the first after his departure wholly endorsed it. Barry and much of the staff set up the rival Week-End Review, which later merged with the New Statesman.

By the 1930s the Saturday Review was in decline and in 1933 was purchased by the eccentric Lucy, Lady Houston, with the intention of using it to promote her fascist views on Britain and the Empire. Lady Houston was a hands-on proprietor who soon took over the editorship herself, despite the fact that she was in her late seventies. Running the paper from her home in Hampstead, or from her luxury yacht, the Liberty, she attacked the politicians whom she thought responsible for the country's weakness – mainly Ramsay MacDonald, Stanley Baldwin, and Anthony Eden. She also took a strong line against the Soviet Union, believing Bolshevik influence to be responsible for many of the ills of the country and British Empire. When Lady Houston died in December 1936 the paper was continued for some months by a group of people who had worked for her. The Saturday Review closed in 1938.
