= Piers Brendon =

British writer

Piers Brendon Ph.D., FRSL
- Born: 21 December 1940 (age 85); Stratton, Cornwall, England, UK
- Education: Shrewsbury School; Magdalene College, Cambridge
- Occupations: Historian and writer
- Employer(s): Cambridge School of Art, Churchill College, Cambridge

Piers Brendon FRSL (born 21 December 1940) is a British historian and writer, known for historical and biographical works.

== Life ==
Brendon was educated at Shrewsbury School and Magdalene College, Cambridge, where he read history. He received a Ph.D. degree for his thesis, Hurrell Froude and the Oxford Movement, which was published, with much modification, in 1974.

From 1965 to 1978, he was lecturer in history, then principal lecturer and head of department, at what is now Anglia Ruskin University. Since 1979, he has worked as a freelance writer of books, journalism and for television.

In 1995, he became a fellow of Churchill College, Cambridge and was keeper of the Churchill Archives Centre from 1995 to 2001, in succession to Correlli Barnett. Brendon was himself succeeded by Allen Packwood.

Brendon was elected a Fellow of the Royal Society of Literature in 2009.

== Works ==
- Hurrell Froude and the Oxford Movement. London: Paul Elek. 1974. ISBN 0-236-31080-1 – via Internet Archive.
- Hawker of Morwenstow: Portrait of a Victorian Eccentric. London: Jonathan Cape. 1975. ISBN 0-224-01122-7 – via Internet Archive.
- A Quest of the Sangraal, Cornish Ballads & Other Poems (1975; Robert Stephen Hawker, editor)
- Eminent Edwardians. London: Secker & Warburg. 1979. ISBN 0-436-06810-9 – via Internet Archive.
- The Life and Death of the Press Barons (1983)
- Winston Churchill: A Brief Life (1984)
- Ike - the Life and Times of Dwight D. Eisenhower (1986)
- Our Own Dear Queen (1986)
- Thomas Cook - 150 Years of Popular Tourism (1991)
- The Age of Reform 1820–1850 (1994)
- The Motoring Century: Story of the Royal Automobile Club (1997)
- The Dark Valley: A Panorama of the 1930s (2000; ISBN 0-375-70808-1)
- The Windsors - A Dynasty Revealed 1917–2000, with Phillip Whitehead (2000: ISBN 0712667970. Original 1994; ISBN 978-0340610138)
- The Decline and Fall of the British Empire. London: Jonathan Cape. 2007. ISBN 978-0-307-26829-7 – via Internet Archive.
- Eminent Elizabethans (2013, Penguin Books, ISBN 978-0-099-53263-7)
- Tom Sharpe: A Personal Memoir (2024)
