= Isabella Glyn =

Shakespearean actress

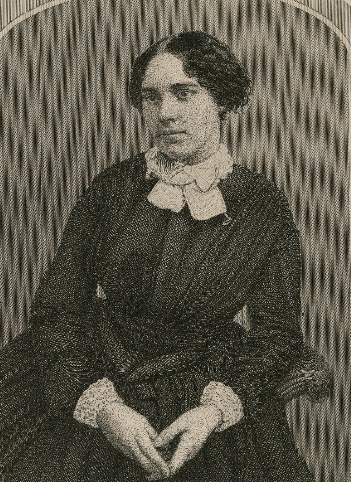
- Born: 22 May 1823; Edinburgh, Scotland, UK
- Died: 18 May 1889 (aged 65); London, England, UK
- Occupation: Actress
- Spouse(s): Edward Wills; Eneas Sweetland Dallas

Isabella Glyn (22 May 1823 – 18 May 1889) was a well-known Victorian-era Shakespearean actress.

== Life ==
Isabella Glyn was born in Edinburgh on 22 May 1823. She made her first stage appearance in Manchester on 8 November 1847, where she appeared as Constance in Shakespeare's King John. She next debuted at the Olympic in London as Lady Macbeth on 28 January 1848. She played at Sadler's Wells Theatre from 1848–51; and gave her first public Shakespearian reading September 1851. She appeared at Drury Lane as Bianca in Fazio on 26 December 1851.

She made subsequent appearances at St. James' in 1854, at Standard in 1855, at Sadler's Wells Theatre in 1859, and Princess's Theatre in 1867. She also gave recitals at Boston in 1870. She gave Shakespearian readings at Steinway hall and at St. James in 1878 and 1879. She was at the end of her career a theatrical instructor; and, the latest adherent of the Kemble school of acting. Her portrait appeared frequently in many popular magazines and journals during her lifetime.

== Death ==
Isabella Glyn died of cancer, four days before her 66th birthday, at 13 Mount St. Grover Square, London on 18 May 1889. She was buried 22 May 1889 at Kensal Green Cemetery.

== Family ==
She was married twice. Her first marriage was to Edward Wills. This marriage, however, was brief due to her husband's premature death. Her second marriage was to the notable The Times journalist, Eneas Sweetland Dallas to whom she was married in Glasgow in December 1853. They had a second wedding in London on 12 July 1855. They were divorced on her petition on 10 May 1874. It was a source of much scandal at the time. Shortly after her case came to trial, she was imprisoned at Holloway for contempt of court in declining to give up documents relating to her divorce case. She was released from custody on 28 June 1879.

== Sources ==
This article incorporates text from a publication now in the public domain: Knight, John Joseph (1890). "Glyn, Isabella Dallas". In Stephen, Leslie (ed.). Dictionary of National Biography. Vol. 21. London: Smith, Elder & Co.

- Modern English Biography, Volume I (A -- H), ed. by Frederick Boase, London: Frank Cass & Co. LTD, 1965.
