= Eneas Sweetland Dallas =

Scottish journalist and author

Eneas Sweetland Dallas (E. S. Dallas) (1828–1879) was a Scottish journalist and writer.

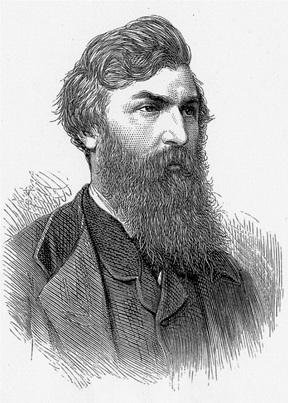
E. S. Dallas, London Illustrated News, 1879

== Biography ==
E.S. Dallas was the elder son of John Dallas of Jamaica, a planter of Scottish parentage, and his wife Elizabeth (née Baillie), the daughter of the Rev. Angus McIntosh of Tain and sister of Rev. Caldor McIntosh. He was born in Jamaica in 1828 and was brought to England when he was four years of age. He was educated at the Edinburgh University, where he studied philosophy under Sir William Hamilton, and acquired the habit of applying notions derived from eclectic psychology to the analysis of aesthetic effects in poetry, rhetoric, and the fine arts.

His first publication in which he proved his mastery of this line of investigation was entitled Poetics, an Essay on Poetry, a work which he produced in 1852, while he resided in London. He first gained notice in London by sending an article to The Times, a critique which by its vigour and profundity secured immediate attention.

For many years afterwards, he was on John Thadeus Delane's staff at The Times, where he wrote biography, politics, and literary criticism.

Dallas also contributed to the Daily News, the Saturday Review (London), the Pall Mall Gazette, and the World. For about a year and a half, in 1868–69, he was editor of Once a Week. In 1866 he produced two volumes of a projected four-volume work named The Gay Science, a title borrowed from Provençal troubadours. It was an attempt to discover the source in the constitution of the human mind of the pleasure afforded by poetry. The subject was, however, too abstruse for the general reader, and the book did not meet with the attention which it deserved.

He acted as a special correspondent for The Times at the Paris exhibition of 1867, and again sent interesting letters to The Times from Paris during the siege of 1870. In 1868 he edited an abridgment of Samuel Richardson's Clarissa. Afterwards he wrote a treatise on gastronomy, based on the famous work of Brillat-Savarin; to it he attached the pseudonym of A. Kettner, and the title was Kettner's Book of the Table, a Manual of Cookery, 1877. More recently he was engaged on a new edition of François de La Rochefoucauld's Maxims, and he wrote an elaborate article on that work, which was unpublished at the time of his death.

In December 1853, he married, according to Scottish law, the well-known actress Miss Isabella Glyn (then the widow of Edward Wills), and on 12 July 1855, he was again married to her at St George's, Hanover Square. A separation followed not long after, and the marriage was dissolved in the divorce court on the wife's petition, 10 May 1874.

E.S. Dallas died at 88 Newman Street, north of Oxford Street, London, 17 January 1879, and was buried at Kensal Green Cemetery on 24 January.

Notable descendants of his include the Scottish writer and actor turned Islamic scholar Ian Dallas.
