= Robson Roose =

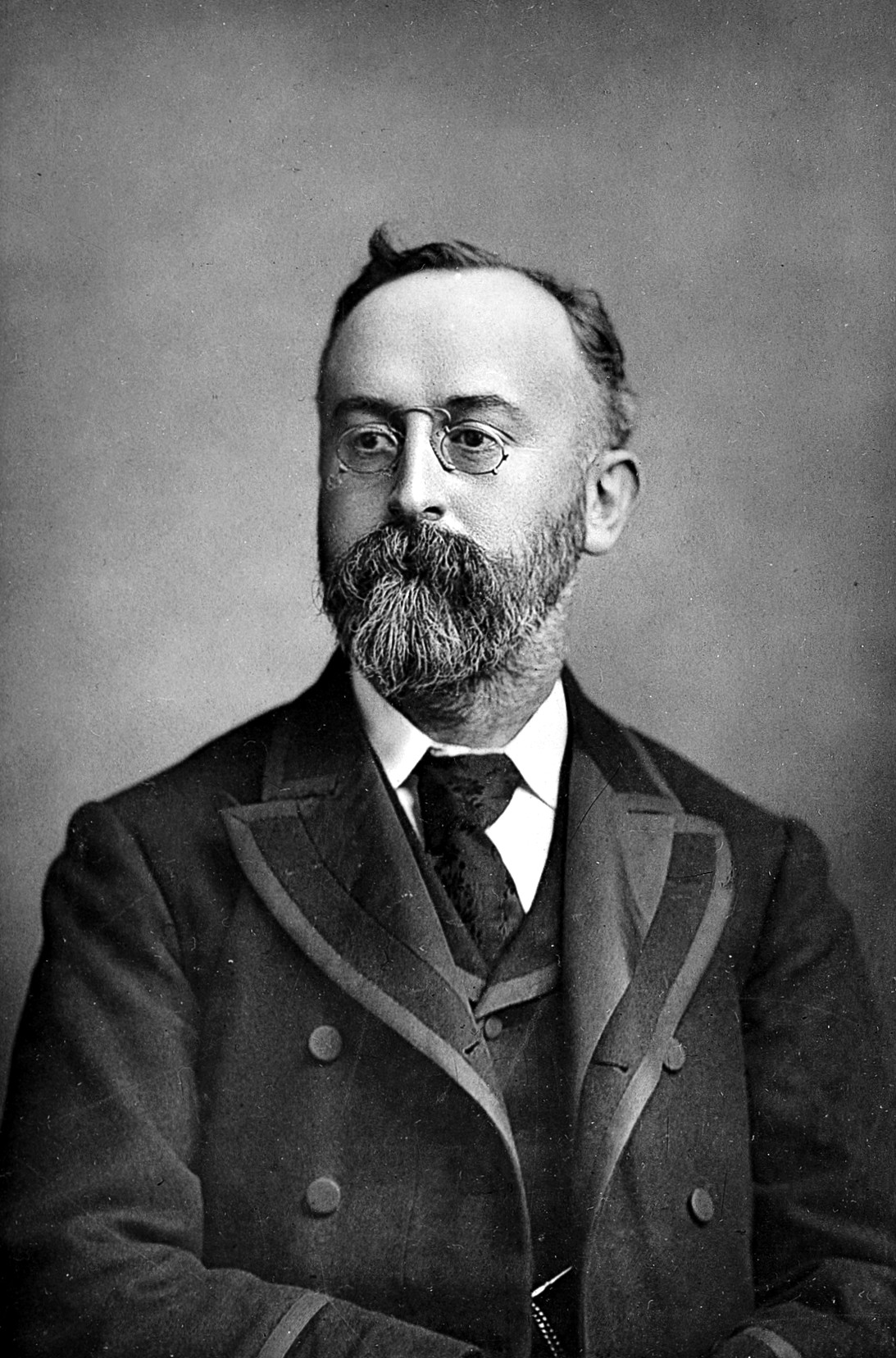
Robson Roose, 1892 photograph

Edward Charles Robson Roose (1848–1905) was an English physician, a fashionable London society doctor of the late Victorian period.

== Early life ==
Born at 32 Hill Street, Knightsbridge, London, on 23 November 1848, he was third son of Francis Finley Roose, solicitor, and his wife Eliza Burn, and grandson of the brewer Sir David Charles Roose. He went to Guy's Hospital, London, and afterwards spent some time in Paris. He obtained the licence of the Society of Apothecaries in 1870, and in the same year he was admitted L.R.C.P. and L.R.C.S. Edinburgh. In 1872 he became M.R.C.S. England; M.R.C.P. Edinburgh in 1875, and F.R.C.P. Edinburgh in 1877. He graduated M.D. at Brussels in 1877.

== Society doctor ==
Roose first practised at 44 Regency Square, Brighton. In 1885 he migrated to 49 Hill Street, Berkeley Square, London. Here he built up a large and fashionable practice. He owed his professional success to his social popularity.

Doctor to Lord Randolph Churchill and Jennie Churchill, Roose treated the young Winston Churchill, aged 11, for pneumonia in March 1886. He entered Trinity Hall, Cambridge that year, but did not reside or take a degree. With Thomas Buzzard, he was attending physician to Lord Randolph who was terminally ill in the 1890s. Other patients indicated in his British Medical Journal obituary were Joseph Chamberlain, Henry Labouchère, Montagu Williams, Edmund Yates and Spencer Compton Cavendish, 8th Duke of Devonshire; it mentioned also his "art of managing patients".

== Later life ==
Later in life Roose became director of a company interested in Kent coal-mining which involved him in litigation. He limited his professional work, and then retired to East Grinstead, Sussex, where he died on 12 February 1905, of hepatic cirrhosis.

== Works ==
Roose published a number of popular medical works:

- Remarks upon some Disease of the Nervous System, Brighton, 1875.
- Gout and its Relations to Diseases of the Liver and Kidneys, 1885; 7th edit. 1894; translated into French from the third edition, Paris, 1887; and into German from the fourth edition, Vienna and Leipzig, 1887.
- The Wear and Tear of London Life, 1886.
- Infection and Disinfection, 1888.
- Nerve Prostration and other Functional Disorders of Daily Life, 1888; 2nd edit. 1891. Roose's theories were influenced by Charles-Édouard Brown-Séquard.
- Leprosy and its Prevention as illustrated by Norwegian Experience, 1890.
- Waste and Repair in Modern Life, 1897.

== Family ==
Roose married in 1870 Edith Huggins, daughter of Henry Huggins, D.L.; she died in 1901. They had four sons and a daughter, Katharine Edith. Edith and the daughter made an appearance at court on 4 March 1891.

== Arms ==
Coat of arms of Robson Roose
Notes Confirmed 20 March 1901 by Sir Arthur Vicars, Ulster King of Arms. Crest On a wreath of the colours a peacock in his pride Proper gorged with a collar and pendent therefrom a four leaved shamrock Or. Escutcheon Gules three water bougets in pale between two flaunches invected Argent. Motto Je Ne Change Qu'En Mourant
