= The World (1753 newspaper) =

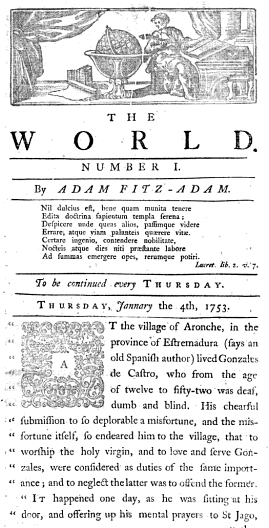
The World, No.1, 1753

The World (1753–1756) was a London 18th century weekly newspaper. Contributors included Edward Moore, Horace Walpole, E. S. Dallas, and Charles Hanbury Williams.

The first issue of The World on Thursday January 4, 1753 included the following introduction by Editor Edward Moore.

"Having thus satisfied the public of my amazing abilities, and having, no doubt, raised its curiosity, to an extraordinary height, I shall descend, all at once, from my doctorial dignity, to address myself to my readers as the author of a weekly paper of amusement, called The World. My design in this paper is to ridicule, with novelty and good-humour, the fashions, follies, vices, and absurdities, of that part of the human species which calls itself "The World", and to trace it through all its business, pleasures, and amusements. But though my subjects will chiefly confine me to the town, I do not mean never to make excursions into the country; on the contrary, when the profits of these lucubrations have enabled me to set up a one-horse chair, I shall take frequent occasions of inviting my reader to a seat in it, and of driving him to scenes of pure air, tranquility, and innocence, from smoke, hurry, and intrigue.

There are only two subjects which, as matters stand at present, I shall absolutely disclaim touching upon; and these are religion and politics. The former of them seems to be so universally practised, and the latter so generally understood, that to enforce the one, or to explain the other, would be to offend the whole body of my readers. To say truth, I have serious reasons for avoiding the first of these subjects. A weak advocate may ruin a good cause. And if religion can be defended by no better arguments than some I have lately seen in the public papers and magazines, the wisest way is to say nothing about it. In relation to politics, I shall only observe, that the minister is not yet so thoroughly acquainted with my abilities as to trust me with his secrets. The moment he throws aside his reserve, I shall throw aside mine, and make the public as wise as myself.

My readers will, I hope, excuse me, if hereafter they should find me very sparing of mottoes to these essays. I know very well that a little Latin or Greek, to those who understand no language but English, is both satisfactory and entertaining. It gives an air of dignity to a paper, and is a convincing proof that the author is a person of profound learning and erudition. But in the opinion of those who are in the secret of such mottoes, the custom is, as Shakspeare says, "more honoured in the breach than the observance"; a motto being generally chosen after the essay is written, and hardly ever having affinity to it through two pages together. But the truth is, I have a stronger reason for declining this custom: it is, that the follies I intend frequently to treat of, and the characters I shall from time to time exhibit to my readers, will be such as the Greeks and Romans were entirely unacquainted with.

It may perhaps be expected, before I dismiss this paper, that I should take a little notice of my ingenious brother authors, who are obliging the public with their daily and periodical labours. With all these gentlemen I desire to live in peace, friendship, and good neighbourhood; or if any one of them shall think proper to declare war against me unprovoked, I hope he will not insist upon my taking further notice of him, than only to say, as the old Serjeant did to his ensign who was beating him, "I beseech your honour not to hurt yourself".
