= Bargrave Deane =

English judge (1846–1919)

The Right Honourable Sir Bargrave Deane
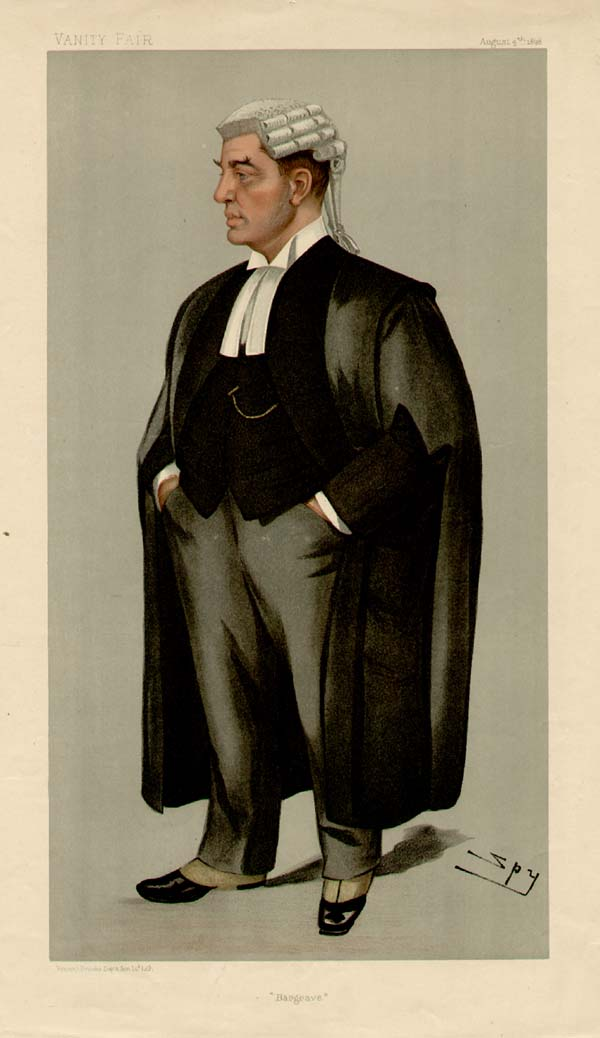
- "Bargrave" - caricature by Spy in Vanity Fair, 4 August 1898

Justice of the High Court
- In office 1 February 1905 – 1917
- Succeeded by: Sir Maurice Hill

Personal details
- Born: 28 April 1848
- Died: 21 April 1919 (aged 70) London

Sir Henry Bargrave Finnelley Deane, PC (28 April 1848 – 21 April 1919) was an English judge.

He was the only son of Sir James Parker Deane and was educated at Winchester College and Balliol College, Oxford where he won the International Law essay prize in 1870.

In 1870, he was called to the Bar, and from 1892 worked primarily in the Probate, Divorce and Admiralty Division of the High Court of Justice. He was made Queen's Counsel in 1896.

He served as Recorder of Margate from 1885 until he was raised to the bench as a Justice of the High Court on 1 February 1905, being knighted at Buckingham Palace on 10 February. He retired in 1917, was granted an annuity of £3,500, and was sworn of the Privy Council on 16 November that year.

From 1908 to 1911, he was the first Knight Principal of the Imperial Society of Knights Bachelor. He died in London.

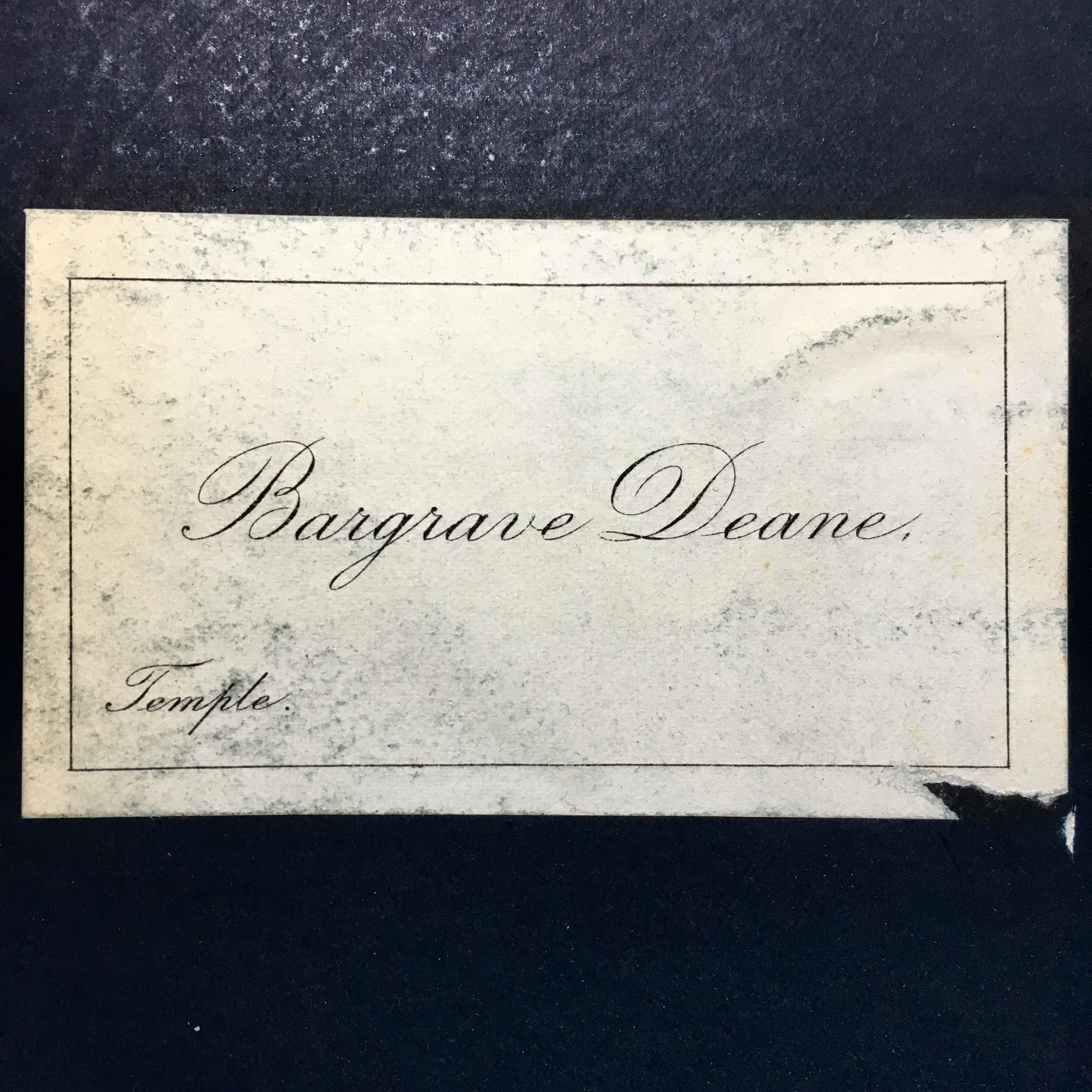
Bookplate of Sir Henry Bargrave Deane, from his copy of 'Wykehamica' by H. C. Adams (1878).

New title	Knight Principal of the Imperial Society of Knights Bachelor; 1908–1911	Succeeded by Henry Pellatt
