= Shelden =

Shelden is a surname. Notable people with the surname include:

- Carlos D. Shelden (1840–1904), American soldier and politician
- Copeland Shelden (1907–1977), American orthodontist
- C. Hunter Shelden (1907–2003), American physician and advocate of the seat belt
- Michael Shelden (born 1951), American biographer and teacher
- Ransom B. Shelden Sr. (1814–1878), American city founder
