= Bruce Castle School =

Coordinates: 51°35′57.6″N 0°4′30.3″W

Information
- Established: 1827
- Closed: 1891

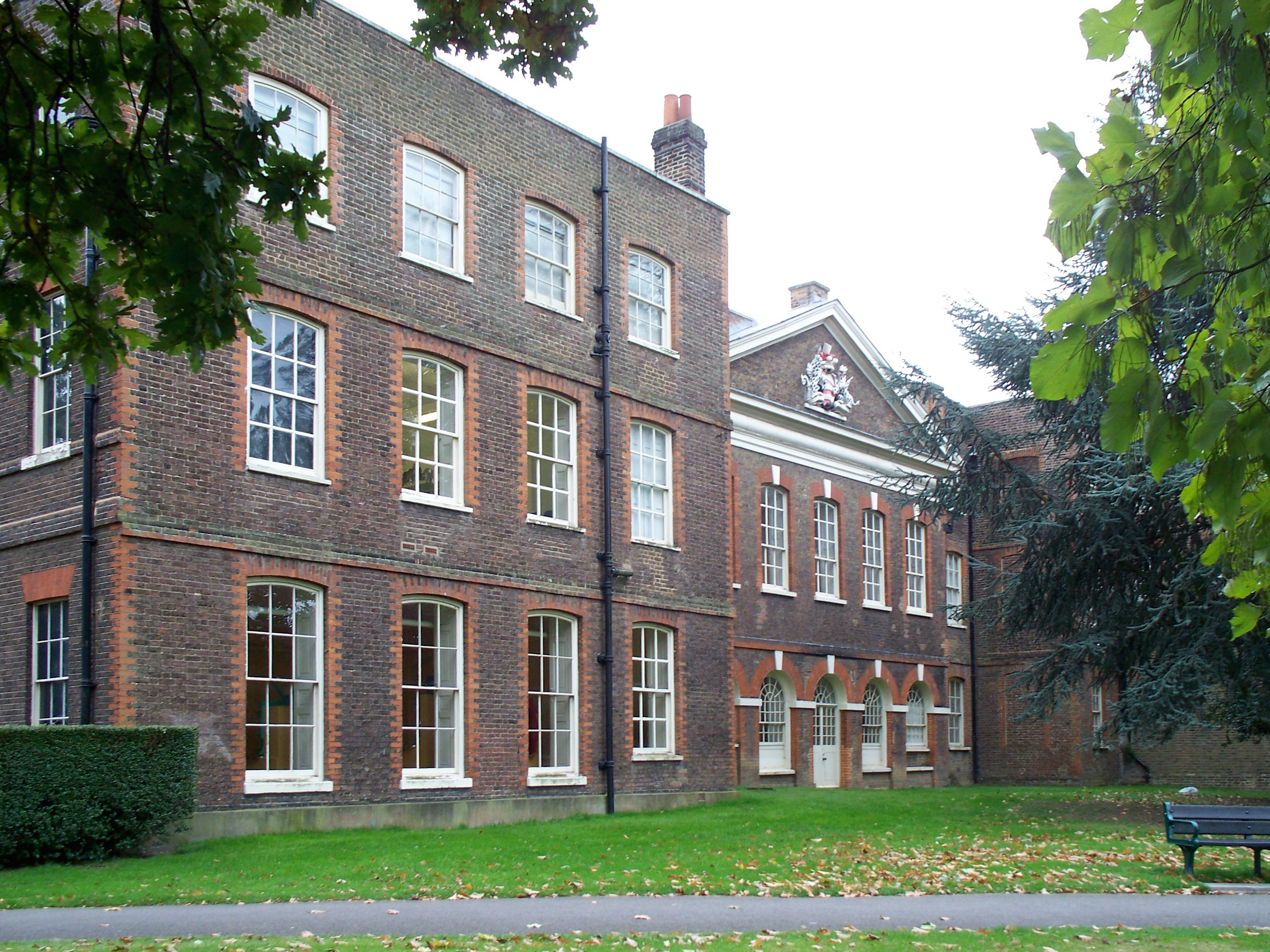
Bruce Castle, the north elevation

Bruce Castle School, at Bruce Castle, Tottenham, was a progressive school for boys established in 1827 as an extension of Rowland Hill's Hazelwood School at Edgbaston. It closed in 1891.

== Origins ==
In 1819, Rowland Hill moved his father's Hill Top School from central Birmingham, establishing a new school called Hazelwood at Edgbaston, an affluent suburb, as an "educational refraction of Priestley's ideas". Hazelwood soon became a model for the education of the new middle classes, aiming to give sufficient knowledge and skills to enable a boy to continue self-education throughout a life "most useful to society and most happy to himself". The new school, which Hill designed himself, had both a science laboratory and a swimming pool. In his Plans for the Government and Liberal Instruction of Boys, Hill argued that kindness, instead of corporal punishment, and moral influence, rather than fear, should be to the fore in school discipline. Science should be a compulsory subject, and boys were to be self-governing. Hazelwood School gained international attention when Marc Antoine Jullien visited the school and wrote about it in the issue of Revue encyclopédique for June 1823, then sent his own son there.

== Foundation ==
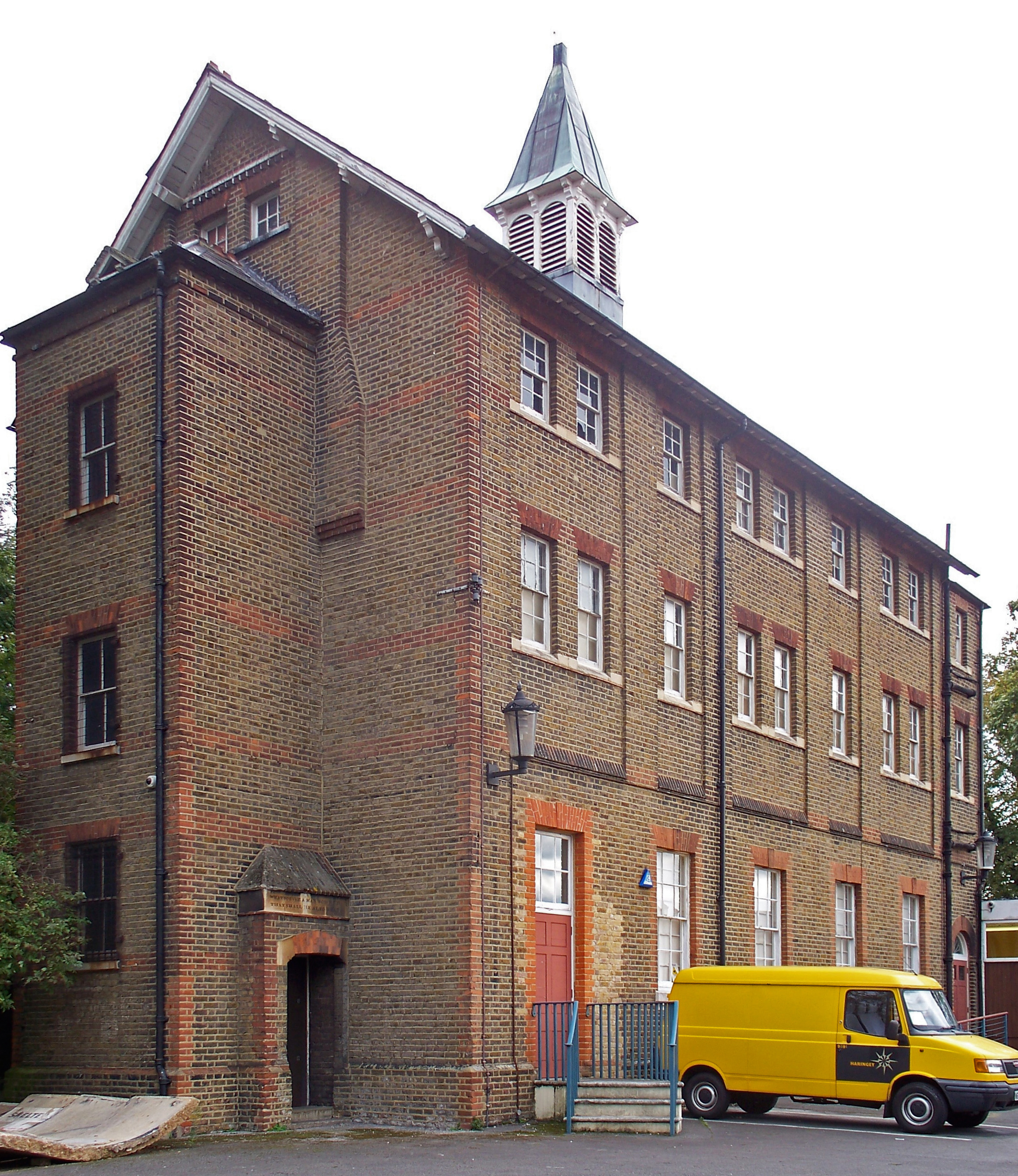
A 19th-century extension built for the school

Hazelwood so impressed Jeremy Bentham that in 1827 a branch of the school was created at Bruce Castle in Tottenham, with Rowland Hill as its head master. Unfortunately for the old school, the new one proved much more popular than the old, with boys transferring to it in large numbers, and in 1833 the original Hazelwood School closed and became a home for Francis and Caroline Clark (sister of Rowland Hill) and their large family. Its educational system was continued at the new Bruce Castle School.

== History ==
From its beginning Rowland Hill ran the school along radical lines, inspired by his friends Richard Price, Thomas Paine, and Joseph Priestley. Its principle was that the role of the schoolmaster is to instill the desire to learn, more than to impart facts. There was no corporal punishment and alleged transgressions were tried by a court of pupils. The school's curriculum included foreign languages, science and engineering. At the time, most established schools focussed on Classics, and for a school to include engineering in its curriculum was almost unheard of.

In 1829 and 1830, Hill employed Edward William Brayley to lecture on physical sciences, both at Hazelwood and at Bruce Castle. In the biography of one early pupil, Sir Henry Barkly (1815–1898), the Oxford Dictionary of National Biography says that "...the school's particular curriculum endowed him with a lifetime interest in science and statistics.

The school taught the sons of Charles Babbage, the computing pioneer, and of many diplomats based in London, especially from the new nations of South America. One such was the son of José Rufino Echenique, a former President of Peru.

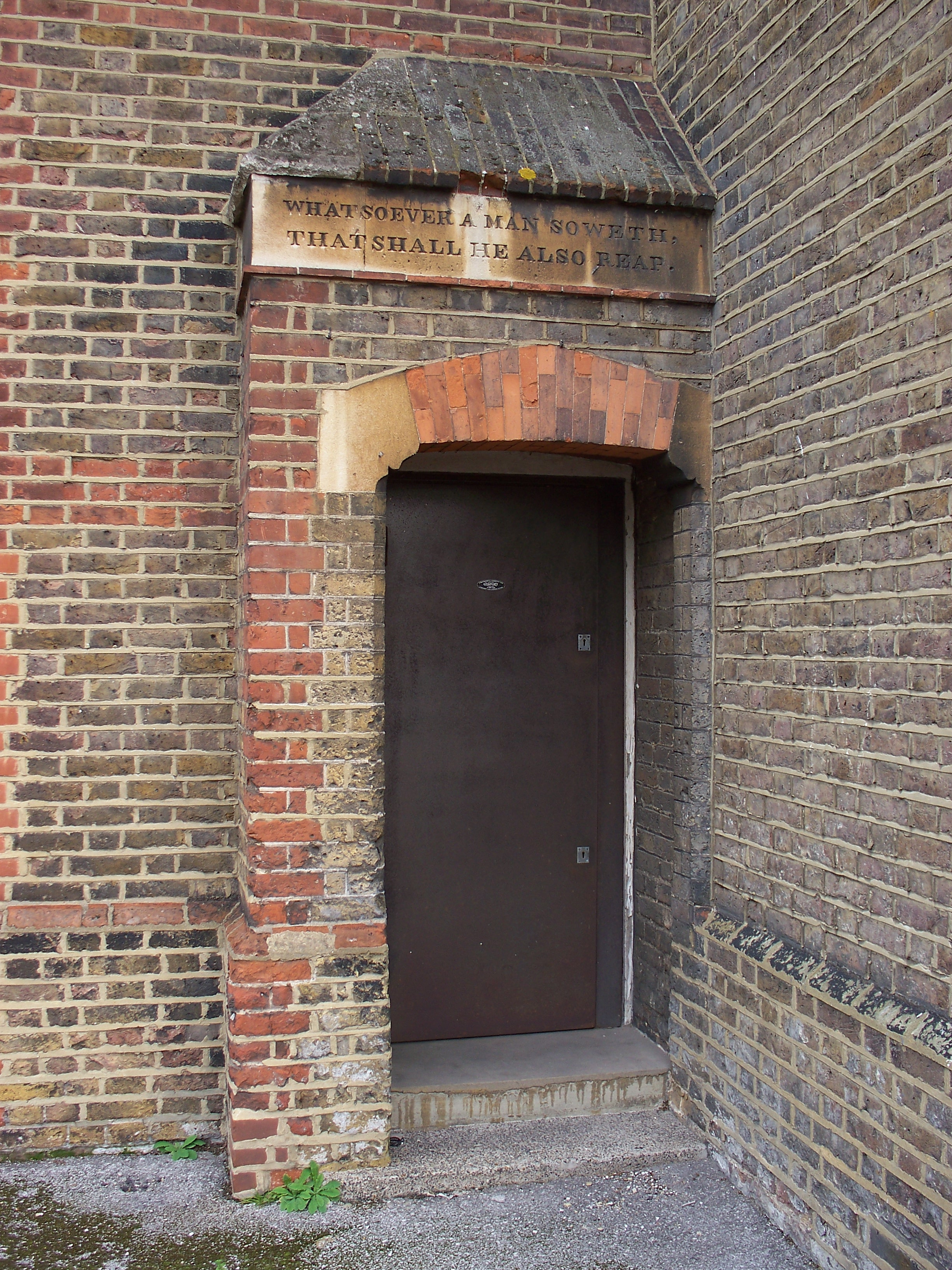
Part of the new building. An inscription over the door reads: "Whatsoever a man soweth, that shall he also reap".

In 1839 Rowland Hill was appointed as head of the General Post Office, where he introduce the world's first postage stamps. He left the school in the hands of his younger brother, Arthur Hill, who continued as head master until 1868, when he was succeeded by his son Birkbeck Hill. He retired in 1877, ending his family's long connection with the school. The Rev. William Almack succeeded him.

During the School's time, Tottenham's character changed. The construction of the Northern and Eastern Railway in 1840 made commuting to central London possible, and in 1872 the Great Eastern Railway opened a line from Enfield to Liverpool Street, with a station at Bruce Grove.

The Bruce Castle School was in some ways a victim of its own success. As its methods were adopted elsewhere, parents returned to traditional schools which had adapted themselves to a new age. The Rev. William Almack continued to run the school until 1891, when it was closed. The Municipal Borough of Tottenham bought the house and grounds, which were opened to the public as Bruce Castle Park in June 1892. The Park is still in use, and is adjacent to Broadwater Farm.

A printing press designed by Rowland Hill and built by pupils of the school is on display at London's Science Museum.

== Head masters ==
- 1827–1839: Rowland Hill
- 1839–1868: Arthur Hill
- 1868–1877: Birkbeck Hill
- 1877–1891: Rev. William Almack

== Notable Old Brucastilians ==
See also Category:People educated at Bruce Castle School

- Sir Henry Barkly (1815–1898), politician and colonial governor
- Dion Boucicault (1820–1890), dramatist and actor
- Sir William Bird (1855–1950), solicitor and Conservative politician
- J. Comyns Carr (1849–1916), drama and art critic, author, poet, playwright and theatre manager.
- Sir Oscar Clayton (1816–1892), surgeon and courtier
- Edmund Creswell (1849–1931), played for the Royal Engineers in the 1872 FA Cup Final
- Frederic Creswell (1866–1948), mining engineer and South African Minister of Defence
- Herbert James Draper (1863–1920), painter
- Wilson Fox (1831–1887), physician
- George Birkbeck Hill, literary critic and head master of the school
- Joseph Moses Levy (1812–1888), newspaper editor and publisher
- Charles Robson (1859–1943), cricketer
- John Scott (1852–1860), cricketer and barrister
- Frederick Selous (1851–1917), explorer
- Henry Sweet (1845–1912), philologist, phonetician and grammarian
- William Terriss (1847–1897), actor
- James Wilson (1849–1929), New Zealand politician and farmer
- Herbert Ward (1873–1897), Southampton footballer and Hampshire cricketer.
- Jerningham Wakefield (1820–1879), New Zealand politician
