= Maurice Hill (judge) =

British judge

Sir Maurice Hill
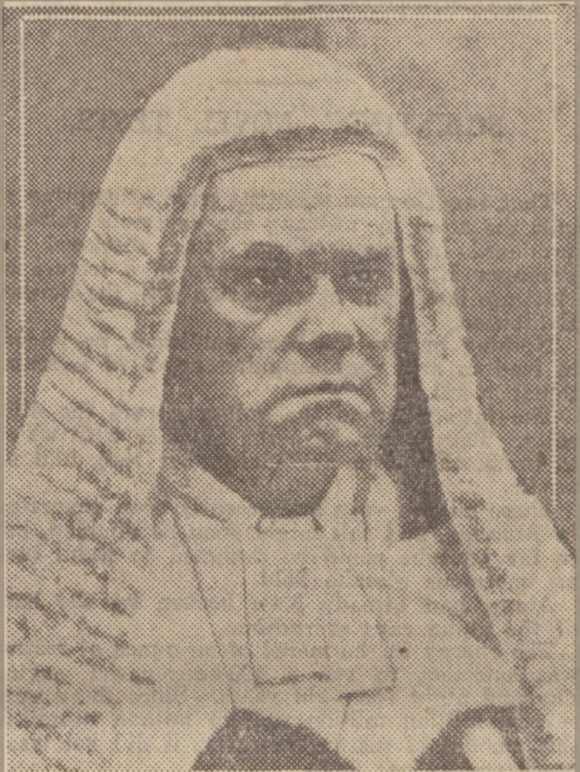

Justice of the High Court
- In office 1917–1930
- Preceded by: Sir Bargrave Deane

Personal details
- Born: Edward Maurice Hill; 8 January 1862 Middlesex, England
- Died: 6 June 1934 (aged 72) Wimbledon, London, England

Sir Edward Maurice Hill (8 January 1862 – 6 June 1934) was a British judge.

Born in Middlesex, the eldest son of Sir George Birkbeck Norman Hill, he was educated at Haileybury College and Balliol College, Oxford, where he was an Exhibitioner, taking Firsts in classical moderations (1881) and literae humaniores (1884). He was called to the bar by the Inner Temple in 1888, and took silk in 1910. His practice was in shipping law, and he was acknowledged as a leading expert in marine insurance. During World War I, he became a government adviser in shipping matters, and was knighted for his services in 1916.

On 18 January 1917, Hill was appointed, on the recommendation of Lord Finlay, to the High Court and assigned to the Probate, Divorce and Admiralty Division. During the first eight years of his judicial career, he was almost exclusively occupied with the large number of admiralty cases that had arisen as a consequence of the War, trying 1313 admiralty cases between 1917 and 1924. Due to the heavy strain of the work and the death of his wife, his health gave way in 1924, and a judge was added to the Division in 1925. When the volume of admiralty cases began to decline, he began to try probate and divorce cases as well. He resigned from the bench in 1930.
