= National Churchill Library and Center =

The National Churchill Leadership Center (NCLC)
- 38.899331°N 77.047453°W
- Location: Washington, D.C., United States
- Established: 2016

Other information
- Director: Justin Reash
- Website: https://winstonchurchill.org/

The National Churchill Leadership Center (NCLC) formerly known as the National Churchill Library and Center is a public library and museum at the George Washington University (GWU) in Washington, D.C., dedicated to the life and work of former British Prime Minister Winston Churchill. It is located on the ground level of the GWU's Gelman Library.

The NCLC was officially opened on 29 October 2016 and is a collaboration between the George Washington University and the International Churchill Society. The concept of a Churchill research library in the United States was conceived in 2012 by International Churchill Society Chairman, Laurence Geller CBE, and the then President of the George Washington University, Steven Knapp. It was the first research facility in the U.S. capital dedicated to the study of Churchill.

The NCLC contains hundreds of volumes by and about Churchill; a touchscreen exhibit based on the 2012 exhibition "Churchill: The Power of Words" at the Morgan Library in New York; online access to the Churchill Archive housed at Churchill College, Cambridge; and primary sources including the engagement diary cards that recorded Churchill's schedule during World War II.

== See also ==
- Churchill Archive
- Churchill War Rooms
- International Churchill Society
- National Churchill Museum
