= International Churchill Society =

Historical society

Coordinates: 51.5022°N 0.1295°W

The International Churchill Society (ICS)
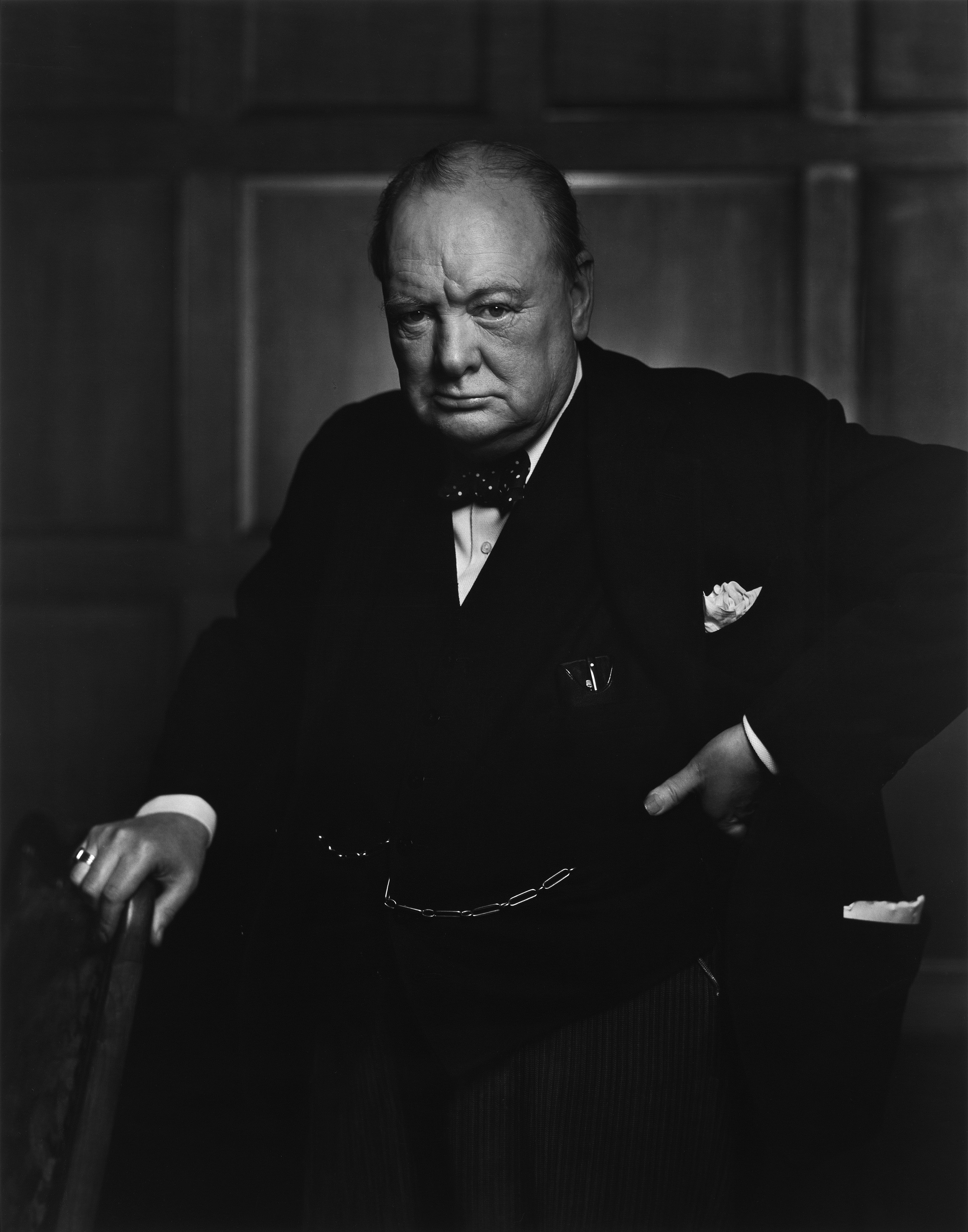
- Founder of The International Churchill Society (ICS) Sir Winston Churchill
- Formation: 1968
- Location: Washington, D.C.
- President: Randolph S Churchill
- Website: winstonchurchill.org

The International Churchill Society (ICS), formerly known as the Churchill Centre, studies the life and works of Winston Churchill. It is based in the United States. The Society's exhibits are located at the Churchill War Rooms in London, and the National Churchill Library and Center at the George Washington University in Washington D.C.

The Society sponsors an annual International Churchill Conference and numerous regional events. With grants from the US National Endowment for the Humanities, the Society has conducted seminars for high school teachers in the United States and United Kingdom.

The society publishes Finest Hour, a quarterly journal which discusses Churchill's political philosophy and its relevance to today's issues.

The Society's offices are located in Washington, D.C. at the National Churchill Library and Center (NCLC).

== History ==
The predecessor organizations were the Winston S. Churchill Study Unit (1968), a chapter of the American Topical Association, and The Churchill Centre. In 2008 The Churchill Centre merged with the American Friends of the Churchill Museum, to form The Churchill Centre and Museum at the Cabinet War Rooms, London. In 2016, with the opening of the National Churchill Library and Center in Washington, D.C., The Churchill Centre was merged into a newly formed entity once again called the International Churchill Society which combined the memberships of The Churchill Centre and the Friends of the National Churchill Museum in Fulton, Missouri.

== The National Churchill Leadership Center (NCLC) ==
The Society partnered with the George Washington University to create a library and museum in Washington, DC. It opened on 29 October 2016.

== See also ==
- Winston Churchill Memorial Trusts
