= Paddington South =

Parliamentary constituency in the United Kingdom, 1885–1974

- Former borough constituency for the House of Commons
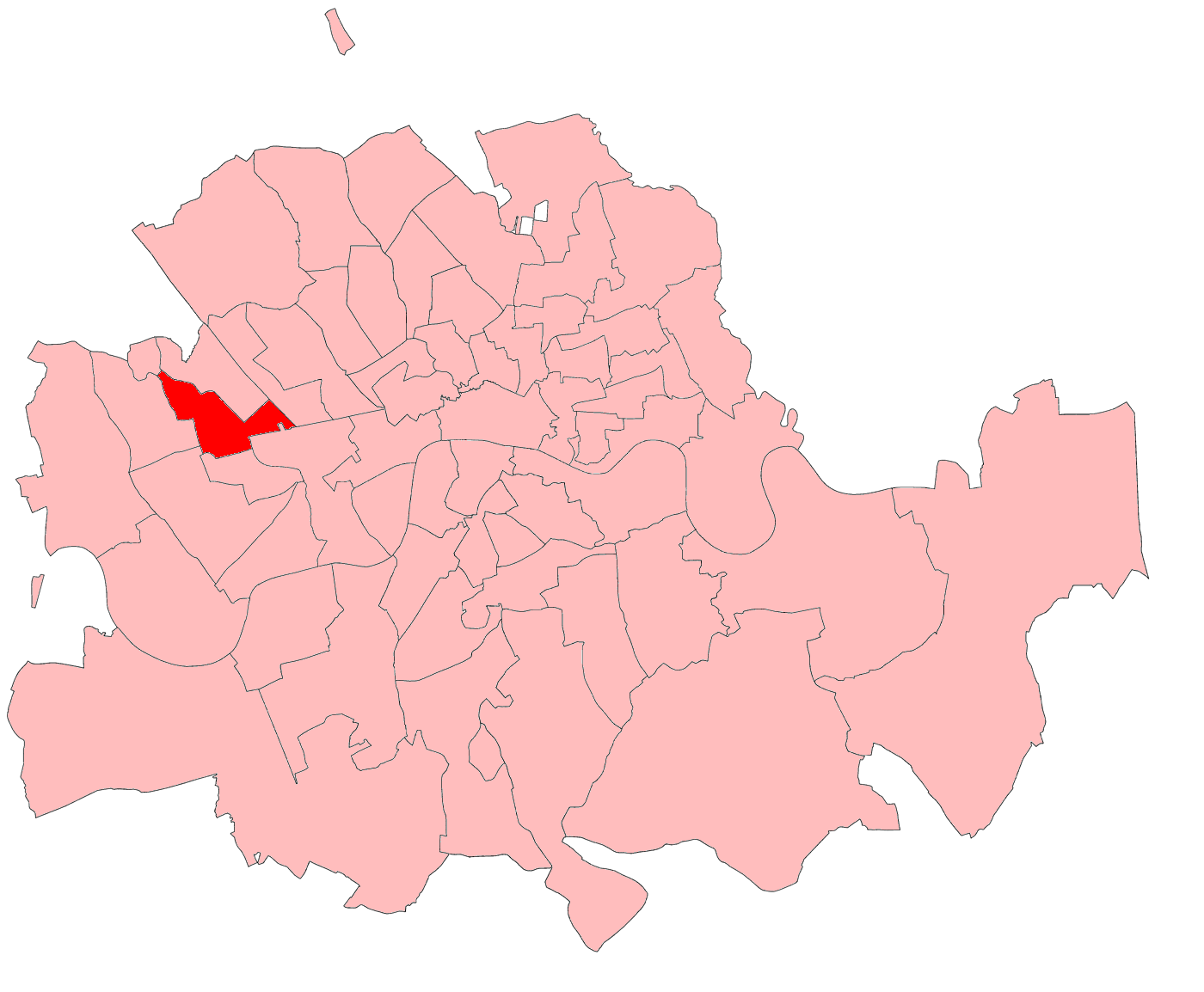
- Paddington South in London, 1885-1918

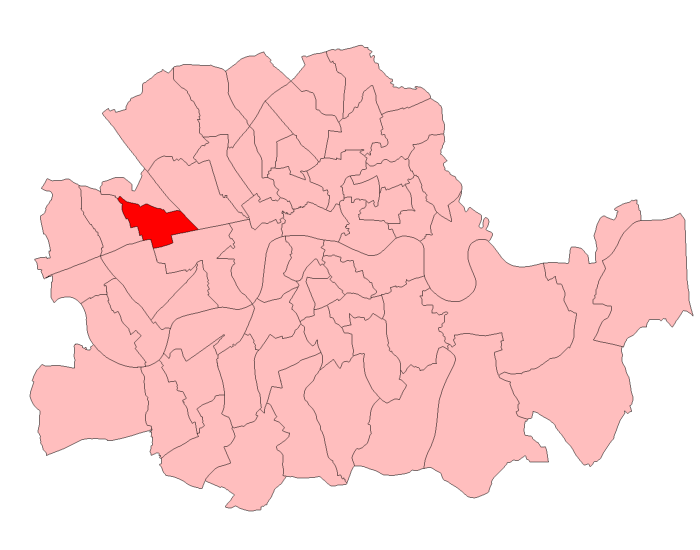
- Paddington South in London, 1918-74

1885–February 1974
- Seats: one
- Created from: Marylebone
- Replaced by: Paddington

Paddington South was a Parliamentary constituency in London which returned one Member of Parliament. It was a compact urban area, but predominantly wealthy, and was most famously represented by Lord Randolph Churchill during the latter part of his career.

== Boundaries ==

The constituency was originally made up of the southern part of Paddington Parish. In the Redistribution of Seats Act 1885 it was defined as including the No. 1, No. 3 and No. 4 wards of the Parish. This comprised an area bounded by Bayswater Road and Kensington Gardens on the south, Chepstow Place and Ledbury Road on the west, Harrow Road, Westbourne Terrace and Praed Street on the north, and Edgware Road on the east.

In 1918 there were boundary changes which moved the northern boundary further north to the Grand Union canal from the Harrow Road to Little Venice, then back on to the Harrow Road between Little Venice and Edgware Road. At this point, the constituency was defined as the following wards of the Metropolitan Borough of Paddington: Hyde Park, Lancaster Gate East, Lancaster Gate West, Westbourne, and the part of the Church ward south of a line on the southern side of the Grand Junction Canal to the Harrow Road Bridge, and thence along the middle of the Harrow Road.

In 1950 there was no change in the boundary but the definition was changed to take account of ward boundary changes which had taken place in 1919. The constituency was defined as the Church, Hyde Park, Lancaster Gate East, Lancaster Gate West and Westbourne wards of the Metropolitan Borough of Paddington. No changes were made in 1955, but due to a falling electorate, the Boundary Commission recommended that Paddington North and Paddington South be merged into a single Paddington constituency in a report issued in 1969. This change took effect at the February 1974 general election.

== Constituency profile ==
Although the boundaries were slightly changed during its history, the principal areas of the constituency remained the same. In the east, the Hyde Park Estate had been built on land owned originally by the Bishop of London and later by the Church Commissioners in the 1820s starting with Connaught Square; it was originally known as Tyburnia after the River Tyburn. This area was always a prosperous one and no longer had the problem of the Tyburn gallows which were removed in 1783. However, the early 20th century saw some of the houses divided into flats and a wholescale redevelopment was undertaken under the Church Commissioners in the 1950s.

West of this estate, on the north side of Kensington Gardens, is Lancaster Gate, built in 1856 but with many later buildings including those to replace bomb damage. The Barrie Estate, built by the London County Council in the 1950s, was one of the few social housing blocks to be built near the park. In later years, many of the terraces were replaced with or converted to hotels. Further west and beyond Queensway came apartment blocks such as Orme Court. North of this area the stuccoed terraces were built in the mid-19th century to provide good quality accommodation although not of the very highest class.

On Queensway, Whiteleys Department Store had been founded in 1863 and steadily expanded, having a major rebuilding in 1908–12. Between this area and Westbourne Terrace was an area redeveloped as the Hallfield Estate after 1947 by Paddington Borough Council using Denys Lasdun as architect. To the west was Westbourne Grove which developed as a shopping street in the 1860s and leading to Notting Hill. Between Westbourne Grove and the railway line which led to Paddington railway station were smaller houses and garden squares. Although originally developed as a residential area of some quality, this area swiftly declined.

In the very last years of the constituency, disused railway sidings north of Westbourne Park Road were developed by Westminster City Council as the high-density Brunel Estate. North of the railway line, and between the canal and Harrow Road, was an industrial area which included the London Lock Hospital. The area added to the constituency after 1918 included some poor quality housing around the northern end of Westbourne Terrace, which was the scene for much of the 1950 film The Blue Lamp before being cleared and redeveloped by the London County Council as the Warwick Estate in the 1960s. The changes in 1918 also brought into the constituency the Paddington Railway station and Paddington Basin.

Overall, this made for a constituency which moved slowly but perceptibly down the social scale during the years, although the preponderance of the electorate were still prosperous at all times.

In 1966, 10% were born in the New Commonwealth.

== Members of Parliament ==
Election	Member	Party
1885	Lord Randolph Churchill	Conservative
1895 by-election	George Fardell	Conservative
1910	Henry Harris	Conservative (Note: Harris was returned as a supporter of the Lloyd George coalition in 1918)
1922	Douglas King	Conservative
1930 by-election	Ernest Taylor	Empire Free Trade Crusade
1931	Ernest Taylor	Conservative
1950	Somerset de Chair	Conservative
1951	Robert Allan	Conservative
1966	Nicholas Scott	Conservative
Feb 1974	constituency merged with Paddington North into Paddington	

== Political history ==
=== 1885 ===
At the 1885 general election, the seat was expected to be a reasonably fair bet for the Conservatives and therefore Conservative MP Lord Randolph Churchill chose it as a bolthole after his existing constituency of Woodstock was abolished in boundary changes. Churchill had originally declared his intention to fight in the Birmingham Central division, but decided to go for this constituency where he had his London home. Churchill was not a very great fan of the constituency, regarding it as inferior in social status to a rural Conservative stronghold.

There was a dispute within the local Liberal Association when it came to ballot on the selection of a candidate on 30 October 1885 between Alderman William Lawrence and Hilary Skinner. Lawrence, who was the incumbent Liberal MP for City of London, later complained that he had been induced to stand, and then found that a large number of previously unknown people who were not on the electoral register had been added to the committee only 48 hours before the ballot, and that that was the reason Skinner won on the night by seven votes. Lawrence therefore decided to fight the seat as an unofficial Liberal candidate. Skinner invited Lawrence to arbitration as to who should get the nomination, but Lawrence refused.

The end results proved that the expectations for the constituency had been accurate. Liberal voters remained loyal to their official candidate.

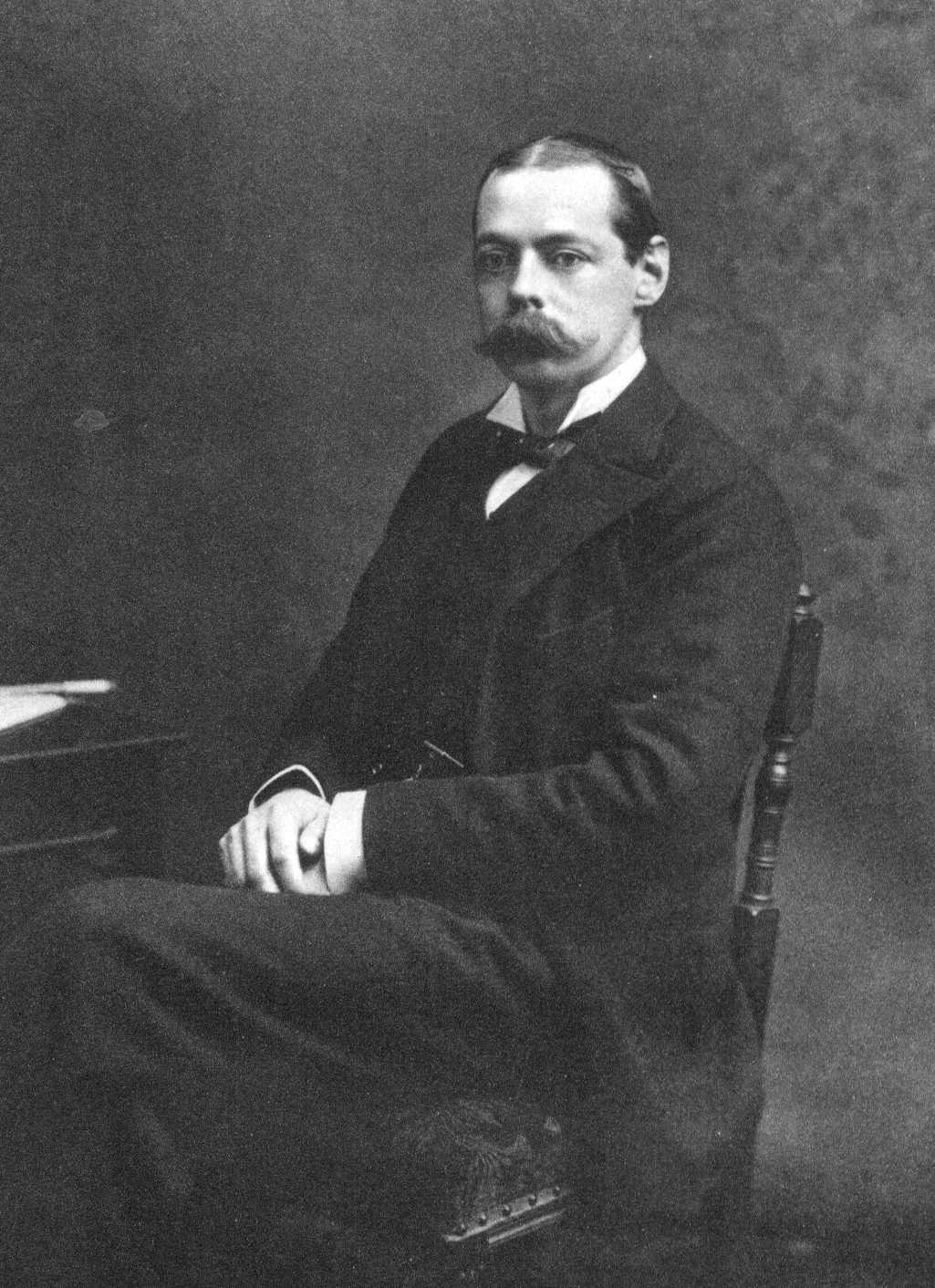
Churchill

General election 1885: Paddington South
Party	Candidate	Votes	%	±%
Conservative	Randolph Churchill	2,731	67.5	
Liberal	Hilary Skinner	1,025	25.3	
Independent Liberal	William Lawrence	290	7.2	
Majority		1,706	42.2	
Turnout		4,046	77.9	
Registered electors		5,193		
Conservative win (new seat)				

=== 1886 ===
For this election, the Liberal Party entered the contest with few illusions, given a national tide against them. Rev. Page Hopps, the Liberal candidate, came from Leicester and said at a public meeting at the opening of the campaign that he had no hope of beating Lord Randolph Churchill but had decided to fight because of abusive language used in Churchill's election address and in order to show him that he could not have South Paddington all to himself. Churchill was not daunted; his election address was the origin of the much-quoted description of Gladstone as "an old man in a hurry". The result was regarded as a strong rebuff to the local Liberals, and when Churchill had to submit to re-election following his appointment as Chancellor of the Exchequer, he ran unopposed.

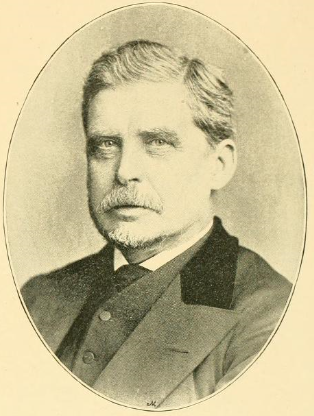
Hopps

General election 1886: Paddington South
Party	Candidate	Votes	%	±%
Conservative	Randolph Churchill	2,576	77.0	+9.5
Liberal	John Page Hopps	769	23.0	−2.3
Majority		1,807	54.0	+11.8
Turnout		3,345	64.4	−13.5
Registered electors		5,193		
Conservative hold		Swing	+5.9	

Later in 1886, Churchill was appointed Chancellor of the Exchequer, requiring a by-election in which he was re-elected unopposed.

By-election, 11 Aug 1886: Paddington South
Party	Candidate	Votes	%	±%
Conservative	Randolph Churchill	Unopposed		
Conservative hold				

=== 1892 ===
Churchill's relationship with his constituency association had come under strain following his resignation from the government and criticism of it. His dissatisfaction with the party became so widespread that it was rumoured that he intended to stand down, although no announcement was made. Eventually, with a general election imminent, on 3 February 1892 the Chairman of the Paddington South Conservative Association wrote to Churchill asking him to confirm whether it was his intention to seek re-election as a Conservative, and whether he would support the general policy of the Conservative Party. Churchill responded that he did intend seeking re-election, and it would be as a Conservative, and that he would give the same support he had given in the past. This response was not entirely satisfactory to the executive of the association, but a majority decided that he would be recommended for endorsement as their candidate.

Churchill's enthusiastic support for the Moderate (i.e. Conservative) candidates in the London County Council election of that spring helped his standing in the Conservative Association and the constituency, and when a general meeting of the Association was held in March, there were only four members voting against his endorsement. No Liberal candidate came forward and he was once again returned unopposed.

General election 1892: Paddington South
Party	Candidate	Votes	%	±%
Conservative	Randolph Churchill	Unopposed		
Conservative hold				

=== 1895 ===
Fardell

The death of Lord Randolph Churchill led to a by-election at which the choice of Conservative candidate was the key decision. The first thought was that the constituency might prove a base for Charles Ritchie, the former President of the Local Government Board who had lost his seat in the east end in the 1892 election. However, Ritchie's role in establishing the London County Council had made him unpopular among Conservatives as the council had become a Liberal dominated body. Instead, the executive of the Paddington South Conservative Association unanimously chose their chairman, George Fardell, who had been a member of the Vestry, the Metropolitan Board of Works and the London County Council, and had a considerable popularity in the division (he claimed, and was not contradicted in the claim, that Lord Randolph Churchill had named him as his successor).

Among the ordinary members of the Association, Ritchie still had a following. At the general meeting of the Association on 2 February 1895, he sent a letter stating that he agreed that his name could go forward to follow Lord Randolph Churchill but did not want to consent to any course of action that would cause dissension in the Association. This diplomatic withdrawal was largely accepted and only one member (Sir Joseph Dimsdale) voted against the adoption of Fardell. The Liberals, having waited for the Conservatives to choose their candidate, again opted out of the contest given Fardell's popularity, and Fardell was returned unopposed.

By-election, 10 Feb 1895: Paddington South
Party	Candidate	Votes	%	±%
Conservative	George Fardell	Unopposed		
Conservative hold				

Fardell was unanimously re-adopted in the general election a few months later, and again ran unopposed.

General election 1895: Paddington South
Party	Candidate	Votes	%	±%
Conservative	George Fardell	Unopposed		
Conservative hold				

=== 1900 ===
Fardell faced no difficulties in securing renomination at this election. The Liberal Association sought a candidate to stand against him, but could not find one, and Fardell was therefore again unopposed.

General election 1900: Paddington South
Party	Candidate	Votes	%	±%
Conservative	George Fardell	Unopposed		
Conservative hold				

=== 1906 ===
The local Liberal Party had only just divided up the St Pancras Liberal Association into two separate constituency associations for the North and South divisions. The newly formed South Paddington Liberal Association, under the presidency of Captain Sinclair, selected Williamson Milne. Milne was a Presbyterian, born in Glasgow in 1863. He was senior partner in the London firm of Milne, Gaff & Stirling, chartered accountants. However, Fardell's popularity (he had been knighted since the previous election) held and he won the seat by nearly two to one.

Milne

General election 1906: Paddington South
Party	Candidate	Votes	%	±%
Conservative	George Fardell	2,919	66.0	N/A
Liberal	Charles Williamson Milne	1,502	34.0	New
Majority		1,417	32.0	N/A
Turnout		4,421	72.0	N/A
Registered electors		6,143		
Conservative hold		Swing	N/A	

=== 1910 ===
On 22 June 1909, Sir George Fardell wrote to the President of the South Paddington Conservative Association to inform him he had decided not to contest the division at the next election, as he was retiring from political life. The Association immediately proceeded to choose a candidate and on 21 July the Executive decided to recommend Henry Harris, one of the constituency's representatives on the London County Council, as the new candidate. Shortly thereafter the South Paddington Liberal Association chose a locally-resident barrister, F. T. H. Henlé, as their candidate. The circumstances of the election, in which the Conservatives highlighted the tax increases of the 1909 budget, helped Harris improve on Fardell's 1906 majority. The election of December was essentially a rerun of that in January.

General election January 1910: Paddington South
Party	Candidate	Votes	%	±%
Conservative	Henry Harris	3,677	72.2	+6.2
Liberal	Frederick Thomas Henry Henlé	1,419	27.8	−6.2
Majority		2,258	44.4	+12.4
Turnout		5,096	79.4	+7.4
Conservative hold		Swing	+6.2	

General election December 1910: Paddington South
Party	Candidate	Votes	%	±%
Conservative	Henry Harris	3,210	71.6	−0.6
Liberal	Frederick Thomas Henry Henlé	1,274	28.4	+0.6
Majority		1,936	43.2	−1.2
Turnout		4,484	69.9	−9.5
Conservative hold		Swing	-0.6	

=== 1914 ===
Another General Election was required to take place before the end of 1915. The political parties had been making preparations for an election to take place and by July 1914, the following candidates had been selected;

- Unionist: Henry Harris
- Liberal:

=== 1918 ===
At the 'coupon' election of 1918, Harris received the endorsement of the Coalition and was therefore readopted without any difficulty. The South Paddington Liberal Association, despite supporting Asquith and therefore opposing the Coalition, had declined in its organisation and therefore once again declined to field a candidate. Paddington had a Borough Labour Party at the time but its efforts were concentrated in the much more promising North division, and therefore Harris once again had the luxury of an unopposed re-election.

General election 1918: Paddington South
Party		Candidate	Votes	%	±%
C	Unionist	Henry Harris	Unopposed		
	Unionist hold				
C indicates candidate endorsed by the coalition government.

=== 1922 ===
In June 1921, Sir Henry Harris (as he had become known, to stop him being confused with the leading Liberal Percy A. Harris on the London County council) announced that he would not contest the next general election. That November, Captain Douglas King was selected. King was a Government Whip and sitting MP for North Norfolk having won it at the 1918 election, but feared (correctly, as it turned out) that it would not be possible to keep it Conservative.

However, King was the second candidate in the race as the Anti-Waste League had announced on 31 July 1921 the selection of Ernest Sawyer as its candidate for the division. Sawyer decided to fight as an unofficial Conservative and his supporters established the Independent Conservative Association of South Paddington to promote him; he had the advantage over King of being a local resident, and many important local Conservatives backed him. Sawyer insisted that he was a supporter of Bonar Law, and that Law's endorsement of King came from ignorance of local circumstances. He used King's membership of the government under David Lloyd George to impeach his commitment to Conservatism, insisting that he himself was an "unfettered loyal supporter of the Conservative government".

The Paddington Borough Labour Party had not been reformed as two Divisional Labour Parties, largely due to resistance on the part of the leadership who felt it would dilute their power and resented pressure from the Labour Party to reorganise. They once again concentrated on Paddington North. No Liberal candidate was nominated. The division within Conservative ranks therefore drew attention to the election. King's statements that there was no difference between his policy and that of Lloyd George, and his 1918 pledge to be free of party ties, were publicised to show that he had acted hypocritically in becoming a Whip for Bonar Law.

The result of the election, a victory of more than two to one for King, was a surprise to many.

General election 1922: Paddington South
Party	Candidate	Votes	%	±%
Unionist	Douglas King	9,699	67.1	N/A
Ind. Conservative	Ernest Edward Sawyer	4,764	32.9	New
Majority		4,935	34.2	N/A
Turnout		14,463	50.5	N/A
Unionist hold		Swing	N/A	

=== 1923 ===
The Conservatives went into the 1923 election with the dispute of the previous year having been settled in King's favour and able to present a united front. An unopposed return was thought likely, but at a late stage Hubert Carr-Gomm came forward as a Liberal candidate. Carr-Gomm had been MP for Rotherhithe from 1906 to 1918 and Private Secretary to Henry Campbell-Bannerman as Prime Minister, but had no links to the area. Poorly prepared, he was able to take only 33% of the vote.

Carr-Gomm

General election 1923: Paddington South
Party	Candidate	Votes	%	±%
Unionist	Douglas King	9,971	67.1	0.0
Liberal	Hubert Carr-Gomm	3,939	32.9	New
Majority		6,032	43.4	+9.2
Turnout		13,910	46.3	−4.2
Unionist hold		Swing		

=== 1924 ===
The disintegration of the Liberal Party in London led to their withdrawal from Paddington in 1924. Douglas King, by now a Commodore, was returned unopposed.

General election 1924: Paddington South
Party	Candidate	Votes	%	±%
Unionist	Douglas King	Unopposed	N/A	N/A
Unionist hold		Swing	N/A	

=== 1929 ===
Commodore King was again returned unopposed at this election. He was one of only seven MPs to enjoy re-election without a contest, and one of only three in Great Britain.

General election 1929: Paddington South
Party	Candidate	Votes	%	±%
Unionist	Douglas King	Unopposed	N/A	N/A
Unionist hold		Swing	N/A	

=== 1930 ===
On Wednesday 20 August 1930, Commodore King's cutter yacht Islander sank in a gale near Fowey, Cornwall. All six aboard, including King himself, were lost. The South Paddington Conservative Association turned to its usual supply of candidates, the representatives of the constituency on the London County Council, and invited the 66-year-old Sir Herbert Lidiard (Chairman of the Association for the previous 16 years) to be their candidate, an invitation which Lidiard accepted after some reluctance. The Labour Party entered the contest with Dorothy Evans, Secretary of the Association of Women Clerks and Secretaries.

Interest was however already aroused at the prospect of the United Empire Party of Viscount Rothermere contesting the byelection. One constituent wrote to The Times to report that he had been canvassed by the party. On 15 September, the party announced that Mrs Nell Stewart-Richardson would be its candidate. At this stage it also seemed likely that there would be a Liberal candidate, although the local association quickly announced that it did not intend to sponsor anyone.

Meanwhile, the Empire Free Trade Crusade, normally allied with the United Empire Party but failing on this occasion due to Lord Beaverbrook's dislike of Mrs Stewart-Richardson, met with Sir Herbert Lidiard who pledged his support for Empire Free Trade but refused to go into Parliament with his hands tied. The Empire Crusaders then resolved to request the Conservative Association to choose a different candidate. When Lidiard declared that he would break the whip to vote in favour of Empire Free Trade, a statement welcomed by Beaverbrook, Neville Chamberlain wrote to him asking for clarification; Lidiard replied stating that he took this position in order to preserve the unity of his local association. In consequence, official Conservative endorsement was withdrawn on 30 September.

This decision led the United Empire Party to withdraw its endorsement from Mrs Stewart-Richardson, although she refused to withdraw from the election. However, Lidiard and the Conservative Association tried to forge a compromise by passing a resolution (6 October) which declared that Lidiard realised that only loyalty to the Conservative Party would see Empire Free Trade enacted. A few days later, Conservative Central Office decided to restore official support and the writ for the byelection was moved. The volte-face by Lidiard incensed Beaverbrook who organised a meeting of Empire Crusaders on 17 October at which Vice-Admiral Ernest Taylor was adopted as the Empire Crusader candidate. Lord Rothermere also pledged his support for Taylor.

There was a lively campaign with a great attendance and much heckling at public meetings in support of the various candidates. Beaverbrook and Rothermere's newspapers strongly supported their candidate. Vice-Admiral Taylor soon eclipsed Mrs Stewart-Richardson as the principal right-wing challenger to the Conservative, despite her insistence on standing even "if an Admiral or anybody else came and took her policy"; the South Paddington division had one of the highest proportions of women voters in the country. Lidiard was accused of having broken his pledge by a questioner, in a meeting which ended with blows being struck. The Labour Party also turned up outside other election meetings with loudspeaker vans, and made a special attempt to canvass domestic servants in the many large houses in the constituency.

Because of the interest, the count was switched from the Thursday night following the poll, to the Friday morning at Paddington Town Hall. The poll on 30 October saw a turnout of 60%, higher than normal in such an area, and the police were much in evidence to ensure order (3,000 people lined Westbourne Grove to hear Vice-Admiral Taylor). Shortly after noon, the result was declared with Vice-Admiral Taylor winning by 941. Taylor said the result was a great blow "to those wobblers who, while not opposing [Empire Free Trade], are afraid to adopt it". Lidiard hit at the press, saying that he had been beaten "by the most intensive press campaign of abuse and misrepresentation ever known in any by-election in our political history", and asserted that "the electors have been misled". Labour polled just over a quarter of the vote.

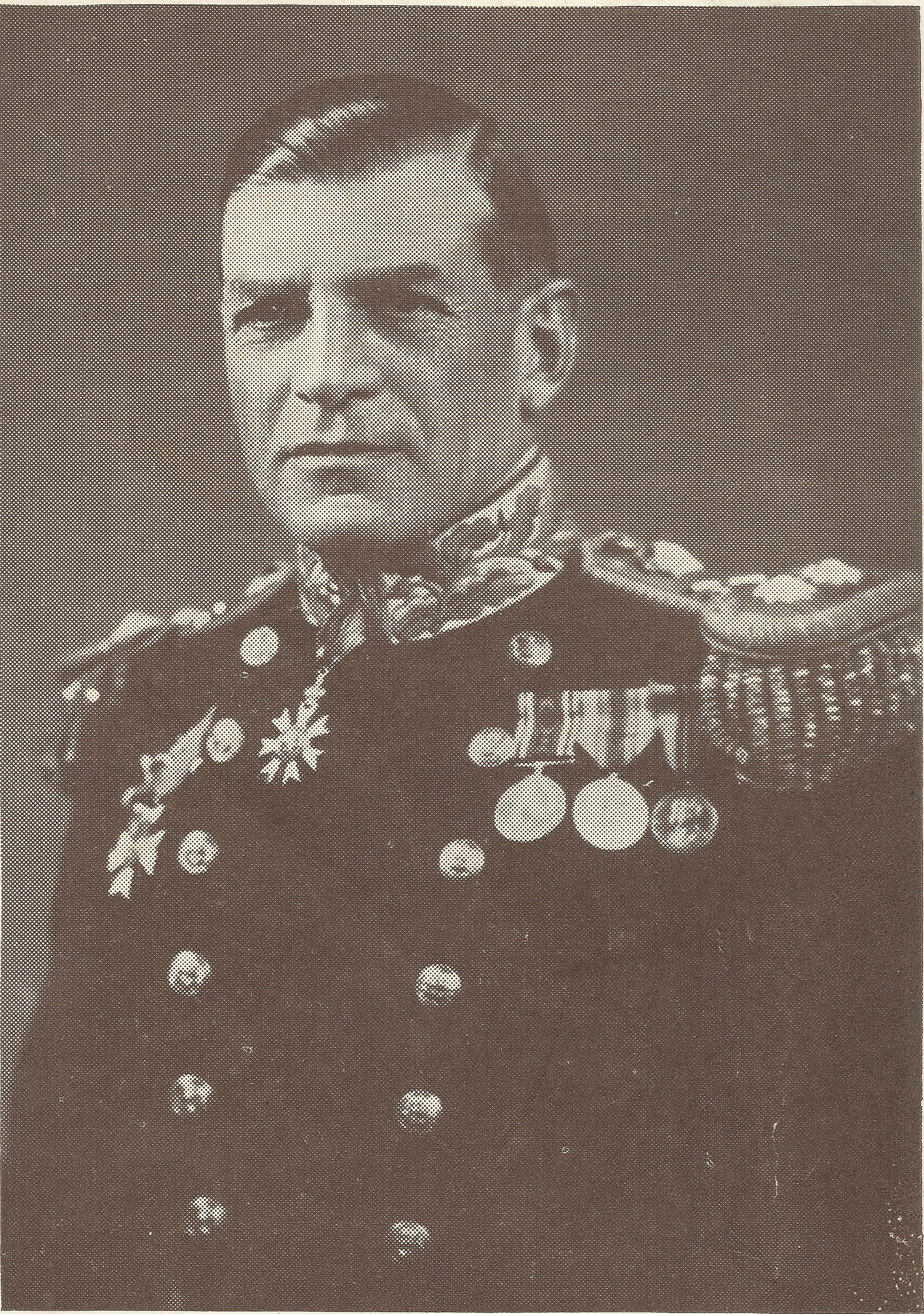
Taylor

1930 Paddington South by-election
Party	Candidate	Votes	%	±%
Empire Crusade	Ernest Taylor	11,209	37.4	New
Conservative	Herbert Lidiard	10,268	34.3	N/A
Labour	Dorothy Evans	7,944	26.6	New
United Empire Party	Alexandra Stewart-Richardson	494	1.7	New
Majority		1,415	5.2	N/A
Turnout		29,915	57.9	N/A
Empire Crusade gain from Conservative		Swing	N/A	

=== 1931 ===
Following the bruising byelection, the South Paddington Conservative Association quickly moved to select a new candidate to challenge Taylor at the following general election, and in December 1930 picked Herbert Williams who was the former MP for Reading and a junior minister in the Baldwin government in 1928–29. The Conservative whips in Parliament swiftly noticed that Taylor's voting pattern was no different from a Conservative MP, and in January 1931 offered him the candidacy at Camberwell North if he would relinquish South Paddington, an offer which Taylor declined, telling the press "I am the Conservative member for the constituency, and I am entitled to call my organization the Conservative Association". When the full membership of the South Paddington Conservative Association met on 27 January 1931, a motion to endorse Vice-Admiral Taylor was defeated by hundreds of votes to 13.

All seemed set for another fight between two Conservatives, when the 1931 economic crisis turned political life upside down. Taylor backed the National government in the first House of Commons vote, and at a meeting organised by the South Paddington Conservative and Empire Crusade Association on 30 September insisted that he would be fighting the division at the general election. On 5 October, Williams announced "in the present national emergency" that he would withdraw his candidature, and the South Paddington Conservative Association declared that it would not divide the forces supporting the National government. Taylor therefore obtained Conservative endorsement and in a straight fight with Labour candidate Lucy Cox (a former schoolmistress then working as Secretary of the 'No More War' Movement) easily prevailed.

General election 1931: Paddington South
Party	Candidate	Votes	%	±%
Conservative	Ernest Taylor	27,206	85.7	N/A
Labour	Lucy Cox	4,532	14.3	N/A
Majority		22,674	71.4	N/A
Turnout		31,738	71.4	N/A
Conservative hold		Swing	N/A	

=== 1935 ===
Five years after the byelection, the divisions within Conservatism in the division were becoming forgotten and Taylor had built up something of a personal following. Ronald Thomson, who was a salesman and Paddington Borough Councillor for Church Ward, fought as the Labour candidate and cut Taylor's majority, although by less than the national swing.

General election 1935: Paddington South
Party	Candidate	Votes	%	±%
Conservative	Ernest Taylor	21,344	78.9	−6.8
Labour	Ronald William Thomson	5,722	21.1	+6.8
Majority		15,622	57.8	−13.6
Turnout		27,066	55.7	−15.7
Conservative hold		Swing	-6.8	

=== 1939 ===
With another election expected to be called by 1940, Labour adopted G.I.Thain as their candidate to unseat Ernest Taylor, however, the election never took place.

=== 1945 ===
Following the end of the war, the Conservatives were confident of re-election and Vice-Admiral Taylor again offered himself as the Conservative candidate. Labour selected Charles Wegg-Prosser, a former Articled Clerk to a Solicitor, and a Major in the London Irish Rifles. Wegg-Prosser had undertaken an unusual journey to the Labour Party, having been attracted to economic fascism while at university and been appointed as Principal Speaker for the East End of London by the British Union of Fascists (he stood as a BUF candidate for the London County Council in 1937). However he had never been an anti-Semite and after the election wrote to Sir Oswald Mosley protesting his use of antisemitism and resigning from the party. Wegg-Prosser later became a forceful and effective anti-fascist speaker.

Labour put some effort into winning the campaign, and shortly after the poll (but before the result was declared), one of the campaign organisers was fined 40 s. for using a loud-speaker so loud that a neighbour said it sounded like "a brass band in the room". However, Taylor was re-elected by more than 3,500 votes.

General election 1945: Paddington South
Party	Candidate	Votes	%	±%
Conservative	Ernest Taylor	13,131	57.8	−21.1
Labour	Charles Wegg-Prosser	9,601	42.2	+21.1
Majority		3,530	15.6	−42.2
Turnout		22,732	64.2	+8.5
Conservative hold		Swing	-21.1	

=== 1950 ===
By now in his early seventies, Vice-Admiral Taylor decided in 1947 to retire at the next election. In February 1948 the Conservatives chose the author Somerset de Chair as their candidate. De Chair had been elected MP for South West Norfolk in 1935 but was defeated in 1945 by 53 votes. His wife was elected to the London County Council from Paddington South in 1949.

Labour reselected Charles Wegg-Prosser, who had been elected to Paddington Borough Council in November 1945, and had now set up a Solicitor's practice on Praed Street. For the first time in 27 years the Liberals entered the field, with commercial law barrister Saul Myer fighting the seat. With a much increased turnout, de chair kept the seat Conservative with Labour suffering more from Liberal intervention.

General election 1950: Paddington South
Party	Candidate	Votes	%	±%
Conservative	Somerset de Chair	19,964	55.93	
Labour	Charles Wegg-Prosser	13,141	36.82	
Liberal	Saul Myer	2,589	7.25	New
Majority		6,823	19.11	
Turnout		35,694	74.04	
Conservative hold		Swing		

=== 1951 ===
Shortly after the election, Thelma de chair discovered that her husband had for two years been renting a flat in Belgravia for his mistress, Carmen Appleton. She was outraged, and the local Conservatives were sympathetic to her. Somerset de chair was left in no doubt that he would not be readopted, and on 14 June 1950 he announced that he would not be fighting the next election. On 28 June, Judge Bensley Wells granted Thelma de chair a decree nisi of divorce on grounds of the adultery of her husband in an undefended suit.

With a narrow Parliament and an election possibly imminent, the Conservative Association quickly selected Robert Allan as their new candidate. Allan, a former Commander in the Royal Naval Volunteer Reserve, was then the General Manager of the Investors Chronicle and the Banker, and had fought previous elections in his native Dunbartonshire. Labour initially selected Robert S. W. Pollard, but Pollard resigned the candidacy on 15 February 1951 stating that as a pacifist and a member of the Society of Friends, he could not accept the Labour government's rearmament programme. The party then fell back to Charles Wegg-Prosser, who had become the principal Labour Party member locally. The Liberals declined to fight again following their lost deposit the previous year.

Despite the presence of Herbert Morrison at an eve of poll joint meeting in support of both the Paddington candidates, Labour was unable to reduce the Conservative majority.

General election 1951: Paddington South
Party	Candidate	Votes	%	±%
Conservative	Robert Allan	20,741	59.8	+2.9
Labour	Charles Wegg-Prosser	13,932	40.2	+3.4
Majority		6,809	19.6	+0.5
Turnout		34,673	71.7	−2.3
Conservative hold		Swing		

=== 1955 ===
After the tumult of the previous years, the 1955 general election was a relatively dull affair with Charles Wegg-Prosser again providing the only opposition to Robert Allan. In line with the national swing, Allan improved his majority.

General election 1955: Paddington South
Party	Candidate	Votes	%	±%
Conservative	Robert Allan	18,479	61.8	+2.0
Labour	Charles Wegg-Prosser	11,432	38.2	–2.0
Majority		7,047	23.6	+4.0
Turnout		30,181	64.3	−7.4
Conservative hold		Swing		

=== 1959 ===
Charles Wegg-Prosser decided not to be the Labour candidate in the 1959 election, and the South Paddington Constituency Labour Party selected Dennis Nisbet, a left-winger who was an administrative officer of the National Coal Board. Despite the large Conservative majority in previous elections, the constituency was being looked at by Labour as a potential target due to the low turnout and large turnover in the electorate, being identified as such by a committee headed by Harold Wilson. However, Robert Allan had by now been appointed as a junior Minister and was unruffled by any Labour threat: he improved his majority with a slightly above average swing.

General election 1959: Paddington South
Party	Candidate	Votes	%	±%
Conservative	Robert Allan	16,006	64.7	+2.9
Labour	Dennis John Nisbet	8,719	35.3	–2.9
Majority		7,287	29.4	+5.8
Turnout		24,725	60.4	−3.9
Conservative hold		Swing		

=== 1964 ===
South Paddington Constituency Labour Party became increasingly identified with the left in the 1960s. The CLP passed a resolution calling on Hugh Gaitskell to resign over the Clause IV row in July 1960 and its delegates championed "the transfer of power from the capitalist class into the hands of the workers" at Labour Party conference. Angry delegations from the local party sometimes disturbed Paddington Borough Council meetings. William Dow, a councillor from Westbourne Ward, was selected as candidate. Dow was charged with obstruction of the police over an incident when he tried to prevent the eviction of a family from St Stephen's Gardens in August 1963.

In such circumstances the Liberal Party decided that they should fight the seat in the hope of re-establishing themselves as leading challengers to the Conservatives. They selected John Glyn Barton, a solicitor from Hampstead, who won some publicity for himself in September 1963 by personally digging up the road outside his home to find a broken water main which he blamed for the loss of water to his home. However, before the election Barton stood down and was replaced by Philip Cowen, an investment analyst.

Meanwhile, Robert Allan left the government in 1960 to become Treasurer of the Conservative Party, an unpaid post that was identified as a stepping-stone to higher office. He fought the 1964 election campaign supporting the Conservative policy on housing, and opposing the Labour policy of lowering mortgage rates, claiming that this would require tax subsidies. The result showed the Liberals cutting into the Conservative vote more than Labour, and Allan's majority was reduced to 3,399.

General election 1964: Paddington South
Party	Candidate	Votes	%	±%
Conservative	Robert Allan	10,838	52.73	
Labour	William Dow	7,439	36.19	
Liberal	Philip Maurice Raymond Cowen	2,278	11.08	New
Majority		3,399	16.54	
Turnout		20,555	58.35	
Conservative hold		Swing		

=== 1966 ===
Following the 1964 election, the Labour Party decided that the situation in South Paddington CLP could no longer be tolerated. The South Paddington Young Socialists' branch circulation of Trotskyist literature spurred the party to act. On 10 February 1965, it was announced that the constituency party had been disbanded and that a new organisation would be formed from the bottom up. The disbanded CLP then purported to expel from membership George Brown, who lived in the constituency, on the grounds that he had broken Labour Party policy. Many of the leading members of the disbanded CLP were not readmitted to the new organisation, including William Dow. The Labour candidate was an odd compromise: Hon. Conrad Russell was a son of Bertrand Russell, then well known for his activities in the Committee of 100, but was himself a moderate.

Robert Allan vacated his office as Treasurer of the Conservative Party in October 1965, and announced on 3 February 1966 that he would stand down at the general election in order to devote more time to his business interests. The Conservative Association did not have long to choose their new candidate and picked Nicholas Scott who was a printing and publishing executive and Holborn Borough Councillor. The Liberals selected Dudley Savill, a tenants' representative on the board of the Notting Hill Housing Trust that owned many local properties.

The election showed an above-average swing to Labour, and although Nicholas Scott was elected, his majority of only 1,443 looked potentially vulnerable in the long-term.

General election 1966: Paddington South
Party	Candidate	Votes	%	±%
Conservative	Nicholas Scott	10,297	48.30	
Labour	Conrad Russell	8,854	41.53	
Liberal	Dudley Alexander Temple Savill	2,170	10.18	
Majority		1,443	6.77	
Turnout		21,321	62.39	
Conservative hold		Swing		

=== 1970 ===
The small size of the constituency was by now very apparent: it was one of the smallest electorates of all, and the Boundary Commission's report in 1969 recommended the merger of the two Paddington seats. However, the Labour government decided to postpone the implementation of the report, and Paddington South ended up having its last election in 1970. Nicholas Scott had established a reputation as a very moderate Conservative, supporting reforms to abortion, homosexuality and divorce on free votes, vigorously opposing Enoch Powell's views on racial integration and becoming President of Progress for Economic and Social Toryism (PEST).

Labour chose Richard Balfe, then still a student researcher, to fight the seat. The Liberal candidate was Eric Pemberton, a business manager in his early 30s. Neither party believed they could challenge the Conservative hold on the constituency and Scott was re-elected with his majority increased to 2,613, although the swing to the Conservatives was notably smaller than in some neighbouring seats.

General election 1970: Paddington South
Party	Candidate	Votes	%	±%
Conservative	Nicholas Scott	10,526	53.15	
Labour	Richard Balfe	7,913	39.95	
Liberal	Eric Pemberton	1,367	6.90	
Majority		2,613	13.20	
Turnout		19,806	57.41	
Conservative hold		Swing		

== Notes ==
Parliament of the United Kingdom
Preceded by Derby	Constituency represented by the chancellor of the Exchequer; 1886	Succeeded by St George's, Hanover Square
