= 1906 London local elections =

Local elections in England

- 1 November 1906

All 1,353 councillors in all 28 London boroughs
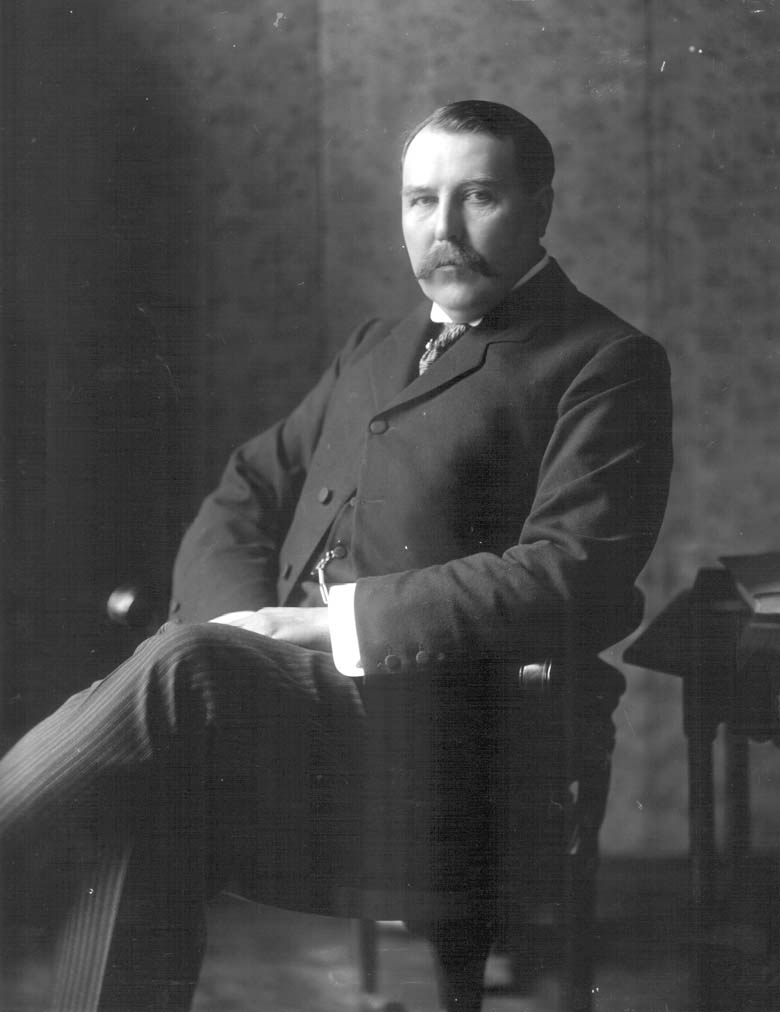
	First party	Second party
Leader	Henry Harris	Thomas Wood
Party	Municipal Reform	Progressive
Councils	22	3
Councils +/–	▲22	▼6
Councillors	929	254
- Results by Borough in 1906. (Blue indicates Municipal Reform, yellow indicates the Progressives and light blue indicates independent control)

Local government elections took place in London on 1 November 1906.

All council seats in all 28 metropolitan boroughs were up for election.

The results were a landslide victory for the Conservatives, who stood as Municipal Reformers. Prior to the election, a central Municipal Reform Committee had been formed in September 1906, and the new organisation absorbed the former Moderate Party, who formed the opposition to the Progressives on the county council, as well as groups on the borough councils that opposed what they termed the "Progressive-Socialist Party".

The Municipal Reformers won 22 boroughs. This compared to three for the Liberals, who stood as Progressives, two for Independents and the nascent Labour Party losing its only borough, Woolwich.

== Political control ==
Summary of council election results:

	Previous control	New control	Municipal Reform	Progressive	Labour and Socialist	Independent
Battersea	Progressive	Progressive	25	29	-	-
Bermondsey	Moderate	Municipal Reform	32	20	2	-
Bethnal Green	Progressive	Progressive	-	30	-	-
Camberwell	Progressive	Municipal Reform	43	11	-	6
Chelsea	Moderate	Municipal Reform	33	3	-	-
Deptford	Progressive/Labour	Municipal Reform	30	1	-	5
Finsbury	Progressive	Municipal Reform	34	13	1	6
Fulham	Progressive/Labour	Municipal Reform	36	-	-	-
Greenwich	Progressive/Independent	Municipal Reform	20	5	-	5
Hackney	Progressive	Progressive/Independent	18	22	-	20
Hammersmith	Moderate	Progressive	15	19	1	1
Hampstead	Independent	Independent	-	-	-	42
Holborn	Moderate	Municipal Reform	37	4	-	1
Islington	Progressive	Municipal Reform	58	2	-	-
Kensington	Moderate	Municipal Reform	43	5	6	6
Lambeth	Moderate	Municipal Reform	55	4	1	-
Lewisham	Progressive	Municipal Reform	42	-	-	-
Paddington	Moderate	Municipal Reform	49	7	-	4
Poplar	Progressive/Labour	Municipal Reform	22	9	9	2
St. Marylebone	Moderate	Municipal Reform	51	5	-	4
St. Pancras	Progressive	Municipal Reform	48	10	2	-
Shoreditch	Moderate	Municipal Reform	31	9	2	-
Southwark	Progressive	Municipal Reform	32	27	1	-
Stepney	Progressive/Independent	Municipal Reform	42	14	-	4
Stoke Newington	Independent	Independent	-	-	-	30
Wandsworth	Moderate	Municipal Reform	58	-	-	2
Westminster	Moderate	Municipal Reform	53	5	2	-
Woolwich	Labour	Municipal Reform	22	-	13	1
