= Lady Juliet Tadgell =

British heiress

- Born: Ann Juliet Dorothea Maud Wentworth-Fitzwilliam; 24 January 1935 (age 91); London, England
- Education: University of Oxford (MFA)
- Spouses: Victor Hervey, 6th Marquess of Bristol (m. 1960; div. 1972) Somerset de Chair (m. 1974; died 1995) Christopher Tadgell (m. 1997)
- Children: Lord Nicholas Hervey; Lady Anne Hervey; Helena, Lady Rees-Mogg
- Parent(s): Peter Wentworth-Fitzwilliam, 8th Earl Fitzwilliam; Olive Dorothea Plunket

Lady Ann Juliet Dorothea Maud Tadgell (née Wentworth-Fitzwilliam; born 24 January 1935), previously Marchioness of Bristol, is a British heiress, race horse breeder, and landowner. She consistently appears on the Sunday Times Rich List with an estimated net worth of £45 million, based on family assets she inherited in 1948.

== Early life and education ==
Lady Juliet was born to Peter Wentworth-Fitzwilliam, Viscount Milton, the only son of the 7th Earl Fitzwilliam, and his wife, Olive Plunket.

In 1943, when she was eight, her father inherited the title of Earl Fitzwilliam, and she became Lady Juliet. By this time, her parents' marriage was strained, and there was talk of divorce. In 1948, Earl Fitzwilliam died in a plane crash in France with his lover, Kathleen Cavendish, Marchioness of Hartington, the widow of the heir to the Dukedom of Devonshire and a sister of the future U. S. President John F. Kennedy. As her father's only child, Lady Juliet, still aged only thirteen, inherited his whole unentailed estate and his huge art collection. The following year, she and her mother left the vast stately home of Wentworth Woodhouse in South Yorkshire, and most of its contents were sold.

Lady Juliet holds a Master of Fine Arts degree from the University of Oxford.

== Marriages and family life ==
In 1960, Lady Juliet married Victor Hervey, 6th Marquess of Bristol, twenty years her senior, eighteen days after he inherited peerages and estates on his father's death. He had been divorced the previous year and in his twenties had been made bankrupt, declared the "No.1 Playboy of Mayfair", and gaoled for a drunken dare jewel robbery. The couple had two children:

- Lord Nicholas Hervey (26 November 1961 – 26 January 1998)
- Lady Anne Hervey (26 February 1965), stillborn

The couple separated in 1965 and divorced in 1972.

In 1974, she married Somerset de Chair, who was a former Conservative Member of Parliament for South West Norfolk and Paddington South. The couple had one child:

- Helena Anne Beatrice Wentworth Fitzwilliam de Chair (born October 1977), who became a writer for an oil industry trade magazine. She married the Rt Hon. Sir Jacob Rees-Mogg, future Conservative politician and son of former Times editor Lord Rees-Mogg, on 13 January 2007 at Canterbury Cathedral. They have six children.

After her second husband's death, in 1997, Lady Juliet married thirdly the architectural historian Christopher Tadgell and lives with him at her estate of Bourne Park, near Canterbury, Kent.

Her daughter Helena attended the University of Bristol, and her son Nicholas was educated at Eton College, followed by Yale University.

On 26 January 1998, two days after her 63rd birthday, her son Nicholas committed suicide.

== Wealth and inheritance ==
As the only child of the 8th Earl Fitzwilliam, Lady Juliet inherited his estates, which have since passed into a trust for her benefit, and include his vast art collection, including four paintings by George Stubbs and six by Anthony van Dyck and properties in England, Ireland and the United States. She consistently makes the Sunday Times Rich List, rising in 2009 to 1550th in the ranking with £35 million, although she suffered a £10 million drop that year because of the recession. She ran a stud farm and continues to own some racehorses.

== Ancestry ==
Ancestors of Lady Juliet Tadgell

8. William Wentworth-FitzWilliam, Viscount Milton
4. William Wentworth-Fitzwilliam, 7th Earl Fitzwilliam
9. Laura Beauclerk
2. Peter Wentworth-Fitzwilliam, 8th Earl Fitzwilliam
10. Lawrence Dundas, 1st Marquess of Zetland
5. Lady Maud Dundas
11. Lady Lilian Lumley
1. Lady Juliet Wentworth-Fitzwilliam
12. William Plunket, 4th Baron Plunket
6. Hon. Benjamin Plunket
13. Anne Lee Guinness
3. Olive Plunket
14. Sir Thomas Butler, 10th Baronet, of Cloughgrenan
7. Dorothea Butler
15. Hester Bellingham
