= 1930 Paddington South by-election =

UK parliamentary by-election

The 1930 Paddington South by-election was held on 30 October 1930. The by-election was held due to the death of the incumbent Conservative MP, Commodore Douglas King. It was won by the Empire Free Trade Crusade candidate Ernest Taylor.

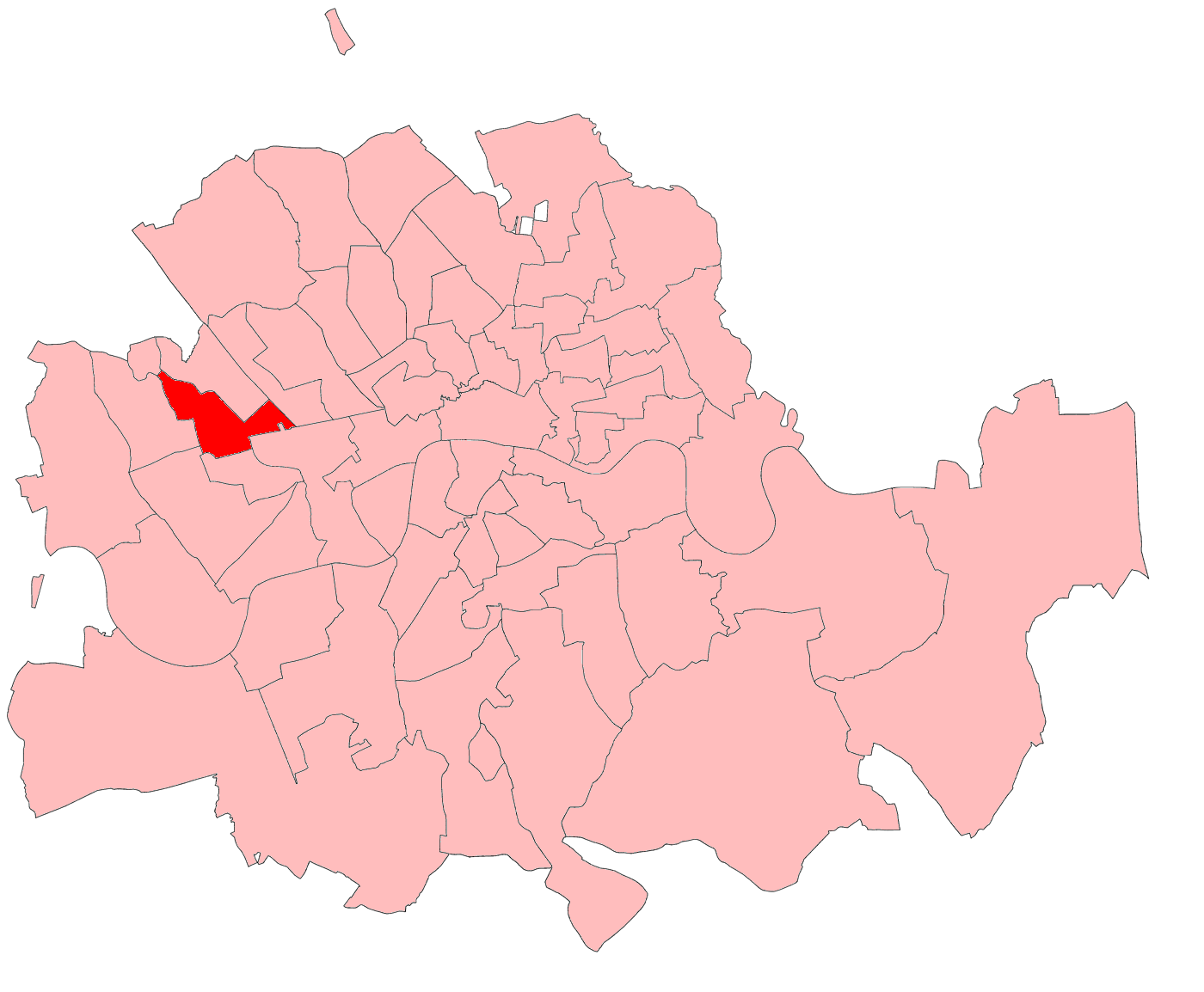
Paddington South in the metropolitan area, 1885–1918

On Wednesday 20 August 1930, King's cutter yacht Islander sank in a gale near Fowey, Cornwall. All six aboard, including King himself, were lost. The South Paddington Conservative Association turned to its usual supply of candidates, the representatives of the constituency on the London County Council, and invited the 66-year-old Sir Herbert Lidiard (Chairman of the Association for the previous 16 years) to be their candidate, an invitation which Lidiard accepted after some reluctance. The Labour Party entered the contest with Dorothy Evans, Secretary of the Association of Women Clerks and Secretaries.

Interest was however already aroused at the prospect of the United Empire Party of Viscount Rothermere contesting the byelection. One constituent wrote to The Times to report that he had been canvassed by the party. On 15 September, the party announced that Mrs Nell Stewart-Richardson would be its candidate. At this stage it also seemed likely that there would be a Liberal candidate, although the local association quickly announced that it did not intend to sponsor anyone.

Meanwhile the Empire Free Trade Crusade, normally allied with the United Empire Party but failing on this occasion due to Lord Beaverbrook's dislike of Mrs Stewart-Richardson, met with Sir Herbert Lidiard who pledged his support for Empire Free Trade but refused to go into Parliament with his hands tied. The Empire Crusaders then resolved to request the Conservative Association to choose a different candidate. When Lidiard declared that he would break the whip to vote in favour of Empire Free Trade, a statement welcomed by Beaverbrook, Neville Chamberlain wrote to him asking for clarification; Lidiard replied stating that he took this position in order to preserve the unity of his local association. In consequence, official Conservative endorsement was withdrawn on 30 September.

This decision led the United Empire Party to withdraw its endorsement from Mrs Stewart-Richardson, although she refused to withdraw from the election. However, Lidiard and the Conservative Association tried to forge a compromise by passing a resolution (6 October) which declared that Lidiard realised that only loyalty to the Conservative Party would see Empire Free Trade enacted. A few days later, Conservative Central Office decided to restore official support and the writ for the byelection was moved. The volte-face by Lidiard incensed Beaverbrook who organised a meeting of Empire Crusaders on 17 October at which Vice-Admiral Ernest Taylor was adopted as the Empire Crusader candidate. Lord Rothermere also pledged his support for Taylor.

There was a lively campaign with a great attendance and much heckling at public meetings in support of the various candidates. Beaverbrook and Rothermere's newspapers strongly supported their candidate. Vice-Admiral Taylor soon eclipsed Mrs Stewart-Richardson as the principal right-wing challenger to the Conservative, despite her insistence on standing even "if an Admiral or anybody else came and took her policy"; the South Paddington division had one of the highest proportions of women voters in the country. Lidiard was accused of having broken his pledge by a questioner, in a meeting which ended with blows being struck. The Labour Party also turned up outside other election meetings with loudspeaker vans, and made a special attempt to canvass domestic servants in the many large houses in the constituency.

Because of the interest, the count was switched from the Thursday night following the poll, to the Friday morning at Paddington Town Hall. The poll on 30 October saw a turnout of 60%, higher than normal in such an area, and the police were much in evidence to ensure order (3,000 people lined Westbourne Grove to hear Vice-Admiral Taylor). Shortly after noon, the result was declared with Vice-Admiral Taylor winning by 941. Taylor said the result was a great blow "to those wobblers who, while not opposing [Empire Free Trade], are afraid to adopt it". Lidiard hit at the press, saying that he had been beaten "by the most intensive press campaign of abuse and misrepresentation ever known in any by-election in our political history", and asserted that "the electors have been misled". Labour polled just over a quarter of the vote.

Paddington South by-election, 1930
Party	Candidate	Votes	%	±%
Empire Crusade	Ernest Taylor	11,209	37.4	New
Conservative	Herbert Lidiard	10,268	34.3	N/A
Labour	Dorothy Evans	7,944	26.6	New
United Empire Party (Note: Mrs Stewart-Richardson was the candidate of the local United Empire Party but was not endorsed by the party nationally, which supported Ernest Taylor)	Alexandra Stewart-Richardson	494	1.7	New
Majority		1,415	5.2	N/A
Turnout		29,915	57.9	N/A
Empire Crusade gain from Conservative		Swing	N/A	
