= Lord Allan =

Lord Allan may refer to:

- Robert Allan, Baron Allan of Kilmahew (1914–1979), British politician
- Richard Allan, Baron Allan of Hallam (born 1966), British politician
