= Douglas King (politician) =

Royal Navy officer

Commodore The Right Honourable Douglas King CB CBE DSO VD
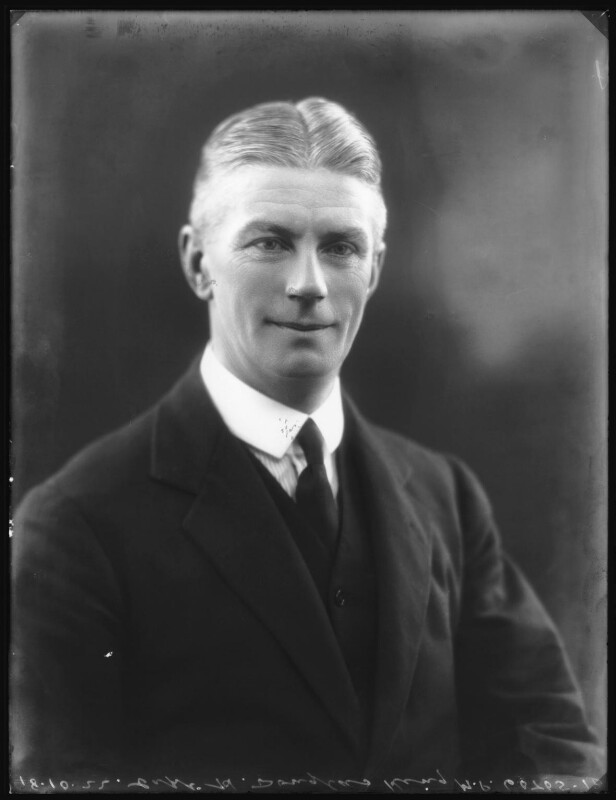

Financial Secretary to the War Office
- In office 11 November 1924 – 13 January 1928
- Monarch: George V
- Prime Minister: Stanley Baldwin
- Preceded by: Jack Lawson
- Succeeded by: Duff Cooper

Secretary for Mines
- In office 13 January 1928 – 4 June 1929
- Monarch: George V
- Prime Minister: Stanley Baldwin
- Preceded by: George Lane-Fox
- Succeeded by: Ben Turner

Personal details
- Born: 1 June 1877 London, England
- Died: 20 August 1930 (aged 53)
- Party: Conservative

Commodore Henry Douglas King, CB, CBE, DSO, VD, PC (1 June 1877 – 20 August 1930) was a British naval commander and Conservative politician. He served under Stanley Baldwin as Financial Secretary to the War Office between 1924 and 1928 and as Secretary for Mines between 1928 and 1929.

== Early life ==
King was born in London, the son of Captain Henry Welchman King. He trained as a Merchant Navy officer in HMS Conway from 1891 to 1893. After Conway he served initially in the mercantile navy, then served in the Royal Navy before joining P & O. He left the sea in 1899 and took up farming for a short while. However, he soon turned to studying law and was called to the Bar, Middle Temple, in 1905. He stood as the Conservative candidate for Norfolk North in the two general elections of 1910, but was defeated on both occasions. At the outbreak of the First World War in 1914 he obtained a commission in the Royal Navy Volunteer Reserve and served at the Siege of Antwerp and Gallipoli. He was awarded the Distinguished Service Order in recognition of his services at Gallipoli in 1915. He was also given the French Croix de Guerre and was appointed a Commander of the Order of the British Empire in 1919.

== Political career ==
At the 1918 general election King once again stood for Norfolk North and was this time elected. King was named a Unionist candidate in the official list of Coalition Government endorsements, but he wrote to The Times stating he had left the party before the election and should be classed as an independent. He later rejoined the party.

In parliament he initially served as Parliamentary Private Secretary to Sir Leslie Wilson, Chairman of the National Maritime Board, and then to Sir Hamar Greenwood, the Chief Secretary for Ireland. In 1921 he was appointed a Conservative whip. The following year he was returned to parliament for Paddington South and entered the government under Bonar Law as a Lord of the Treasury (government whip), a position he held until January 1924, the last year under the premiership of Stanley Baldwin. When the Conservatives returned to office in November 1924, King was made Financial Secretary to the War Office and a member of the Army Council. He held this post until 1928, and was then Secretary for Mines until the Baldwin administration fell in 1929. The latter year he was also sworn of the Privy Council following the 1929 Dissolution Honours. He had been appointed a Companion of the Order of the Bath (CB) in the 1927 Birthday Honours.

== Personal life ==
King married the only daughter of W. R. Swan, of Adelaide, Australia. In 1910 he acquired and later rebuilt The Dales in Upper Sheringham, Norfolk, and lived there until his death.

On 20 August 1930 his cutter yacht Islander sank in a gale off Fowey, Cornwall. All six aboard, including King, were lost at sea. King's memorial at All Saints Church in Upper Sheringham states that the yacht was "smashed to pieces" on the rocky coast of Lanivet Bay, Cornwall, during a "fierce summer storm" and that, "at sunset in the calm stillness of a beautiful summer evening, his ashes were, by his own wish, taken out to sea by the Sheringham lifeboat and within sight of his old home scattered over the face of the waters".

Parliament of the United Kingdom
Preceded by Noel Buxton	Member of Parliament for North Norfolk; 1918–1922	Succeeded by Noel Buxton
Preceded by Sir Henry Percy Harris	Member of Parliament for Paddington South; 1922–1930	Succeeded by Sir Ernest Taylor
Political offices
Preceded by Jack Lawson	Financial Secretary to the War Office; 1924–1928	Succeeded by Duff Cooper
Preceded by George Lane-Fox	Secretary for Mines; 1928–1929	Succeeded by Ben Turner
