= Christopher Tadgell =

British architectural historian (born 1939)

Christopher Ernest Tadgell (born 15 May 1939) is a British scholar of architectural history. He taught for over thirty years, and following retirement continues to research, photograph, and write about architecture.

== Education and academic career ==
Tadgell studied art history at the Courtauld Institute of Art in London. He was awarded his PhD in 1974 upon the completion of his thesis on the Neoclassical architectural theorist Ange-Jacques Gabriel.

Tadgell taught at the University of London and at the Kent Institute of Art and Design in Canterbury, holding the F.L. Morgan Professor of Architectural Design position at the University of Louisville, and membership of the Institute for Advanced Study, Princeton. Tadgell has lectured on architectural history topics at Canterbury College, Kent Institute of Art and Design, Brown University, Harvard University, Columbia University, Cornell University, and Princeton.

In 1983, Tadgell was elected a Fellow of the Society of Antiquaries of London. Between 2008 and 2016, he served as a trustee of the World Monuments Fund. He is currently a trustee of the Academy of Ancient Music.

Photographs by Tadgell are currently being digitised by the Courtauld Institute of Art as part of their Conway Library digitisation project.

== Publications ==
- 1978: Baroque & Rococo Architecture and Decoration, with Anthony Blunt, Alastair Laing, and Kerry Downes. London: Elek.
- 1986: The Forts of India, with Rita Sharma and Vijay Sharma. London: Collins.
- 1998: Hellenic Classicism: The Ordering of Form in the Ancient Greek World. London: Ellipsis.
- 1998: Imperial Form: From Achaemenid Iran to Augustan Rome. London: Ellipsis.
- 1998: Imperial Space: Rome, Constantinople and the Early Church. London: Ellipsis.
- 2000: Japan: The Informal Contained. London: Ellipsis.
- 2002: The History of Architecture in India: From the Dawn of Civilization to the End of the Raj. London: Phaidon.
- 2007: Antiquity: Origins, Classicism and the New Rome. Abingdon; New York: Routledge.
- 2008: Islam: From Medina to the Magreb and from the Indies to Istanbul. Abingdon: Routledge.
- 2008: The East: Buddhists, Hindus and the Sons of Heaven. Abingdon: Routledge.
- 2009: The West: From the Advent of Christendom to the Eve of Reformation. Abingdon: Routledge.
- 2012: Reformations: From High Renaissance to Mannerism in the New West of Religious Contention and Colonial Expansion. Abingdon; New York: Routledge.
- 2020: The Louvre and Versailles: The Evolution of the Proto-typical Palace in the Age of Absolutism. Abingdon; New York: Routledge.

== Personal life ==
Tadgell was born in Sydney, Australia on 15 March 1939. He is married to Lady Juliet Tadgell (née Wentworth-Fitzwilliam). They live on Bourne Park estate in Kent.
