= John Edwin Hilary Skinner =

English barrister and journalist

John Edwin Hilary Skinner (1839–1894) was an English barrister and journalist, known as a war correspondent.

== Life ==
The elder son of Allen Maclean Skinner, Q.C., and a descendant of Matthew Skinner, was born in London in January 1839, and educated at London University, where he graduated LL.D. in 1861. In the same year he was called to the bar at Lincoln's Inn, and went the northern circuit.

A good linguist, he obtained a commission from the Daily News as special correspondent with the Danish Army in the Second Schleswig War. He was present during the campaign down to the Battle of Als at the end of June, when Christian IX of Denmark presented him with the Dannebrog order. He visited America, and then reported the Austro-Prussian War of 1866.

In 1867 Skinner ran the blockade into Crete, then part of the Ottoman Empire. During the Franco-Prussian War of 1870, he was attached to the staff of the Crown Prince of Prussia's staff, and described the war from the battle of Wörth to the battle of Sedan. He carried his account of the decisive battle from Donchery, near Sedan, to London, riding neck and neck with William Howard Russell of The Times, and crossing from Ostend in the same boat. Their stories appeared simultaneously on 6 September, having been anticipated only in the Pall Mall Gazette.

For a short time, in the spring of 1881, Skinner was assistant judicial commissioner in Cyprus. In 1885 he unsuccessfully contested the constituency of Paddington South against Lord Randolph Churchill.

On 30 April 1864 Skinner married Louisa Sarah Chaplin (1838–1897); they had one daughter, Caroline Louisa (1873–1936). He died at Sétif in Algeria, where he had gone for his health, early in November 1894.

== Works ==
Skinner wrote:

- The Tale of Danish Heroism (London, 1865) attempted to deal with the Schleswig-Holstein question.
- After the Storm (London, 1866), dealing with the United States, Canada (of which he advocated the independence), and Mexico.
- Roughing it in Crete (London, 1867), advocating the cession of Crete to Greece.
- Turkish Rule in Crete in the Eastern Question Association papers (No. ix. 1877), against Turkish government.

== Notes ==
Attribution

This article incorporates text from a publication now in the public domain: Lee, Sidney, ed. (1897). "Skinner, John Edwin Hilary". Dictionary of National Biography. Vol. 52. London: Smith, Elder & Co.
