= Benjamin Wegg-Prosser =

British consultant and political adviser

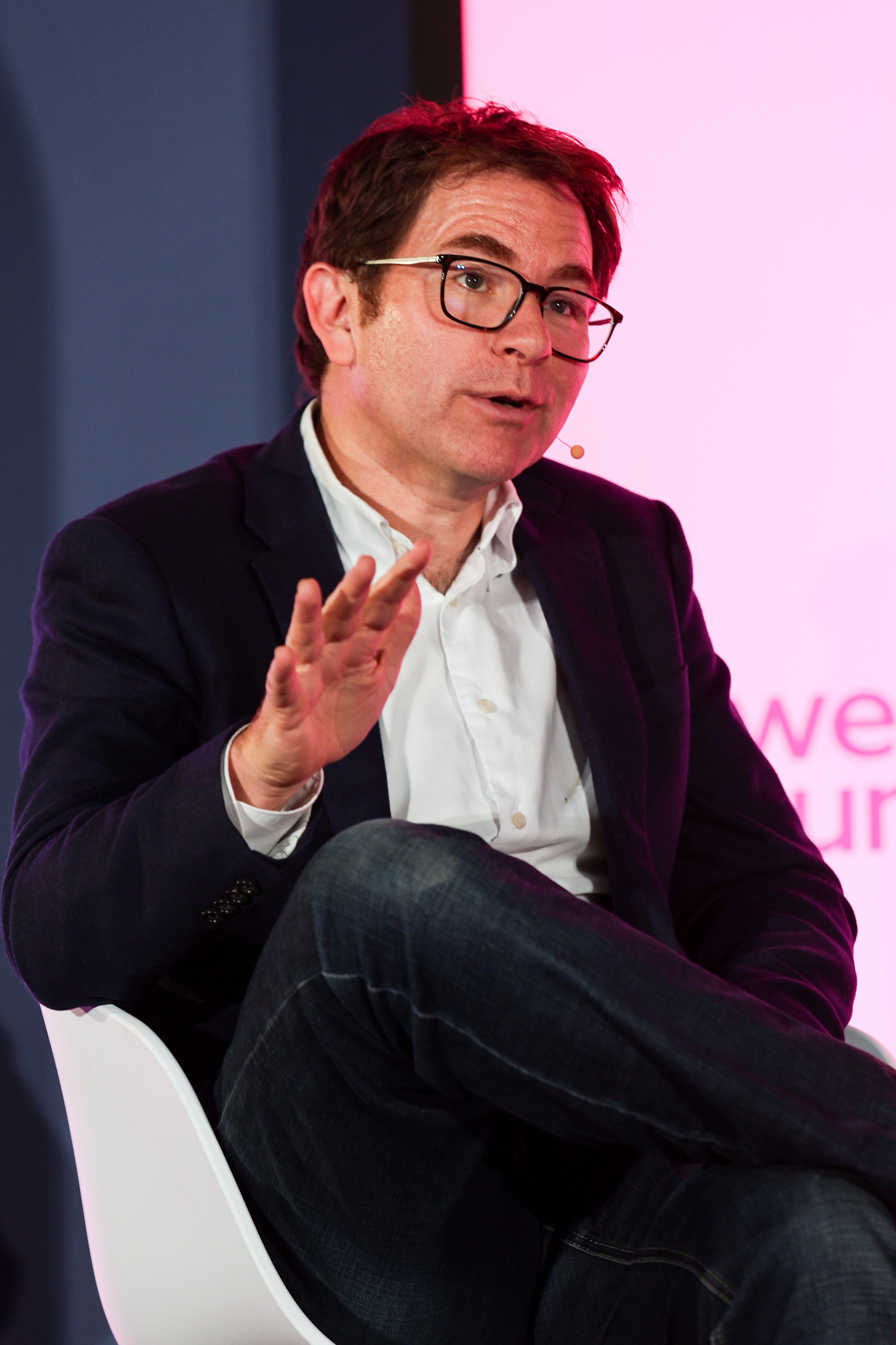
Wegg-Prosser in 2024

Benjamin Charles Wegg-Prosser (born 11 June 1974) is a British consultant and political adviser. He was the CEO and co-founder of Global Counsel, a London-based strategic consultancy and lobbying organisation, in business from 2016 to 2026. (Note: Global Counsel entered administration in February 2026.) Wegg-Prosser was Tony Blair's Director of Strategic Communications at 10 Downing Street.

== Early life ==
Wegg-Prosser's father is the solicitor Stephen Wegg-Prosser. His mother Victoria, née Bird, has been a producer for the BBC.

His grandfather Charles Wegg-Prosser was a British Union of Fascists candidate for Limehouse in the 1937 London County Council election, before repudiating the party and joining Labour. After service in the British Army in World War II, his grandfather served as a councillor on the Metropolitan Borough of Paddington for many years in the 1940s and 1950s, and then an alderman.

He was educated at Southbank International School and the University of Sheffield (BA Politics, 1995).

== Career ==
Wegg-Prosser worked for Peter Mandelson before leaving in December 1998 and working briefly for media group Pearson PLC, before joining The Guardian in 2000. His father acted for Mandelson in the purchase of a home which was investigated by the Parliamentary Commissioner for Standards in 1999.

At The Guardian he held positions as publisher of The Guardian’s politics website, general manager of the education website, and finally publisher of Society Guardian. As publisher of the latter he launched a series of brand extensions including conferences, books, magazines and new sections in the newspaper.

From 2005 to 2007 Wegg-Prosser was Tony Blair's Director of Strategic Communications at 10 Downing Street, where he oversaw a series of innovations including the launch of Downing Street's e-petitions service. He also implemented the first YouTube channel for any head of government, which Blair launched in April 2007.

In 2007 he joined SUP Media, a Moscow-based digital media company, where he was Director of Corporate Development. SUP Media is a Moscow-based online media company which owns LiveJournal.com, Championat.ru, Gazeta.ru, +SOl and Victory SA. In 2008 he additionally became a consultant for recently created public relations company The Ledbury Group, focusing on new media and political relations.

As of 2013, Wegg-Prosser was managing partner of Global Counsel, a London-based strategic consultancy chaired by Peter Mandelson. In April that year, Wegg-Prosser became a director of the Labour Party supporting blog LabourList.

In September 2013, Wegg-Prosser released internal 10 Downing Street emails about the internal fight in September 2006 to prevent Tony Blair being replaced as prime minister by Gordon Brown, which eventually happened in June 2007.

Wegg-Prosser was a funder of Labour Tomorrow, a campaigning group with several senior Labour Party figures on its board, which opposed the leadership of Jeremy Corbyn.

=== Involvement with Jeffrey Epstein ===
On 5 February 2026, Wegg-Prosser was identified as the author of an email to convicted sex trafficker Jeffrey Epstein from his Global Counsel email address, seemingly on behalf of Mandelson, in a US Government document release regarding Epstein. It was also revealed that Wegg-Prosser met with Epstein in 2010and shared business plans for Global Counsel; at the time, Epstein was under house arrest awaiting trial for child sex trafficking offences. On 6 February 2026, Wegg-Prosser resigned as CEO of Global Counsel due to the recent revelations about the links with Epstein; 13 days later, the 100-strong firm confirmed it was going into administration after clients severed relationships over Epstein. Regarding Epstein, Wegg-Prosser has previously said "I had the misfortune to meet Epstein on one occasion ... It was a short meeting of no consequence and thankfully was never to be repeated."
