= George Fardell =

British politician

Fardell in 1895.

Sir Thomas George Fardell (26 October 1833 – 12 March 1917) was a British Conservative Party politician.

He was the youngest son of Reverend Henry Fardell, a Church of England clergyman who held the posts of Canon of Ely and vicar of Wisbech, Isle of Ely, Cambridgeshire and his wife Eliza Sparke, daughter of Bowyer Sparke, Bishop of Ely.

He was educated at Eton College and Christ Church, Oxford, graduating BA in 1856. In 1862 he was called to the bar at Lincoln's Inn. He practised on the Norfolk Circuit before being appointed as Registrar in Bankruptcy in Manchester in 1868.

From 1877 he was involved in various local government bodies in London. He was a member of the Metropolitan Board of Works representing Paddington Vestry from 1885 to 1889, and was a Moderate Party member of the London County Council for South Paddington from 1889 to 1898.

He was the member of parliament (MP) for Paddington South from 1895 to 1910. In 1897 he was knighted.

Parliament of the United Kingdom
Preceded by Lord Randolph Churchill	Member of Parliament for Paddington South; 1895–Jan 1910	Succeeded by Henry Percy Harris
