= Charles Wegg-Prosser =

British politician and solicitor (1910–1996)

Charles Wegg-Prosser (16 August 1910 – 7 October 1996) was a British politician and solicitor.

Wegg-Prosser attended Downside School, then studied at Oriel College, Oxford and became a solicitor. In 1934, he joined the British Union of Fascists (BUF), soon becoming director of the group's Shoreditch branch. For the April 1936 edition of the Fascist Quarterly, Wegg-Prosser wrote "The Worker and the State", denouncing Communist governments as "controlled, not by national workers, but by parasitic Jews" and Fabianism as a "Jewish racket."

At the 1937 London County Council election, he stood for the party in Limehouse, and the party then relocated him to Paddington.

Wegg-Prosser became disillusioned with fascism, making contact with anti-fascist activists, and leaving the BUF at the end of 1937. He then began speaking out against the group's anti-semitism and fondness of dictatorship, and was admitted to the Labour Party, on a year's probation. He served in the British Army during World War II.

In 1945, Wegg-Prosser was elected to Paddington Metropolitan Borough Council, soon becoming chair of its finance committee, and then leader of the Labour group on the council. He stood unsuccessfully in Paddington South at the 1945, 1950, 1951 and 1955 UK general elections. He campaigned against Peter Rachman, was the first chair of the North Kensington Law Centre, and was the first Labour activist to be elected to the governing body of the Law Society of England and Wales.

His grandson Benjamin Wegg-Prosser was Tony Blair's Director of Strategic Communications at 10 Downing Street.
