= Ernest Taylor (Royal Navy officer) =

British Royal Navy officer & politician (1876-1971)

Vice-Admiral Sir Ernest Taylor KCMG CVO
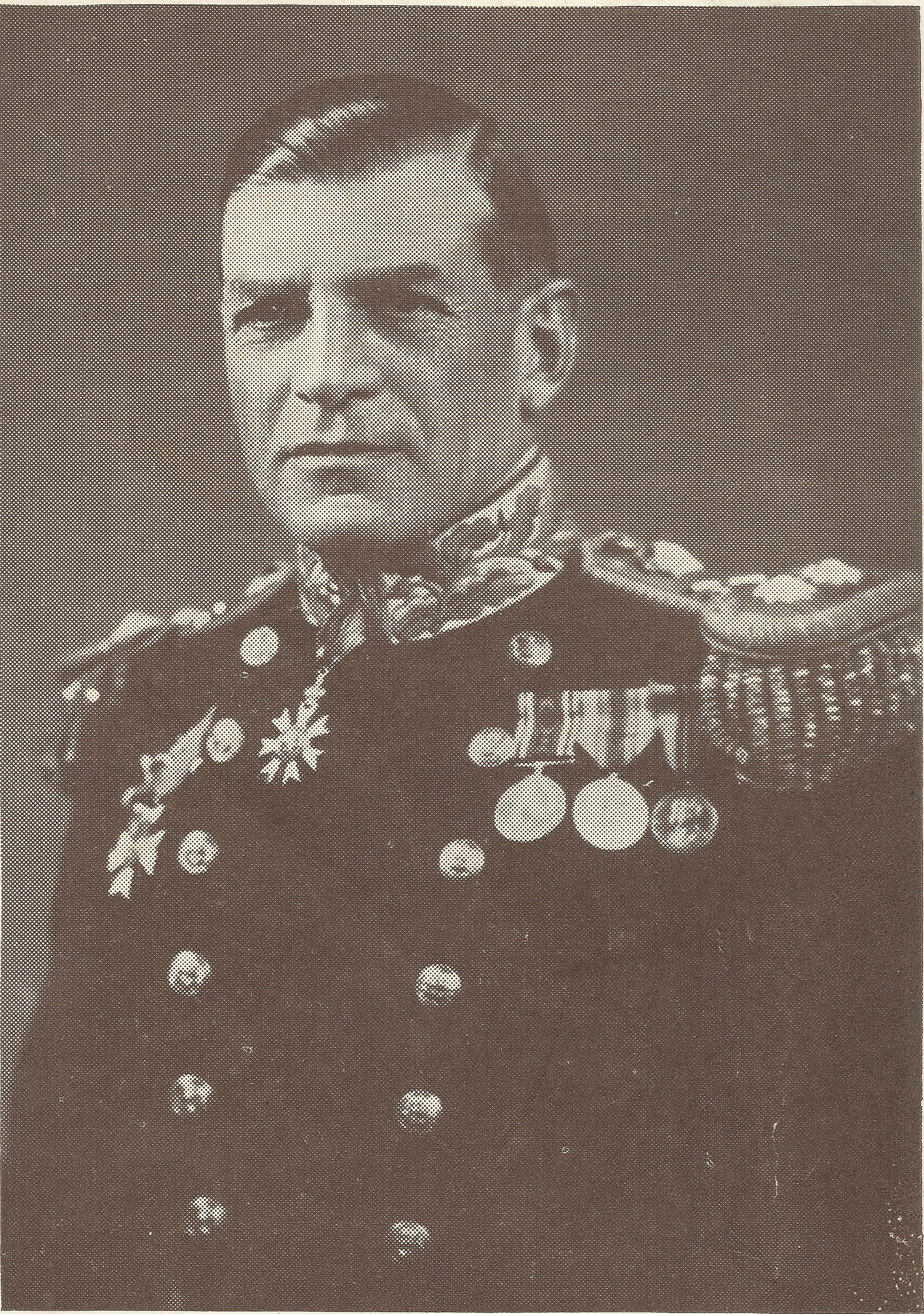

Member of Parliament for Paddington South
- In office 1930–1950
- Preceded by: Douglas King
- Succeeded by: Somerset de Chair

Personal details
- Born: 17 April 1876
- Died: 11 March 1971 (aged 94)
- Party: Empire Free Trade Crusade party Conservative
- Military career
- Allegiance: United Kingdom
- Branch: Royal Navy
- Service years: 1890–1925
- Rank: Vice-Admiral
- Units: HMS Britannia; HMS Renown; HMS Bacchante; HMS Queen; HMS Birmingham; HMS Renown
- Conflicts: World War I

Vice-Admiral Sir Ernest Augustus Taylor, KCMG, CVO (17 April 1876 – 11 March 1971) was a British Royal Navy officer and politician.

In 1898 he married Rose Campbell.

== Naval career ==
Taylor entered HMS Britannia in 1890 and went to sea two years later. In early May 1902, he was appointed gunnery lieutenant on the pre-dreadnought battleship HMS Renown, serving in the Mediterranean Squadron, and late the same year he was transferred to the armoured cruiser HMS Bacchante on her first commission in the same squadron.

He was assistant to the Director of Naval Ordnance from October 1911 to June 1912. In World War I, he commanded the pre-dreadnought HMS Queen and the light cruiser HMS Birmingham, and served as a flag Captain. He became Captain of the battlecruiser HMS Renown in 1919. With her, he was in 1920 in the entourage for the Prince of Wales's tours of Canada, the US, Australia and New Zealand.

== Political career ==
He was a member of London County Council from 1925 to 1928.

He was Member of Parliament (MP) for Paddington South from 1930 to 1950. He had won the 1930 Paddington South by-election as a candidate for the Empire Free Trade Crusade, retaining it in the 1931 General Election. He joined the Conservative Party after that general election.

Parliament of the United Kingdom
Preceded by Douglas King	Member of Parliament for Paddington South; 1930 – 1950	Succeeded by Somerset de Chair
