= Somerset de Chair =

British politician and writer (1911–1995)

Member of Parliament for Paddington South
- In office 23 February 1950 – 4 October 1951
- Preceded by: Ernest Taylor
- Succeeded by: Robert Allan

Member of Parliament for South West Norfolk
- In office 14 November 1935 – 15 June 1945
- Preceded by: Alan McLean
- Succeeded by: Sidney Dye

Personal details
- Born: Somerset Struben de Chair; 22 August 1911 Windsor, Berkshire, England
- Died: 5 January 1995 (aged 83) Antigua
- Party: Conservative
- Spouses: Thelma Grace Arbuthnot (m. 1932; div. 1950) Carmen Appleton (m. 1950; div. 1958) Margaret Patricia Manlove (m. 1958; div. 1974) Lady Juliet Wentworth-Fitzwilliam (m. 1974)
- Children: 6, including: Helena Rees-Mogg
- Parent(s): Admiral Sir Dudley Rawson Stratford de Chair; Enid Struben
- Education: Balliol College, Oxford
- Profession: Author, Politician

Military service
- Allegiance: United Kingdom
- Branch/service: British Army
- Rank: Captain
- Unit: Royal Horse Guards
- Battles/wars: Second World War; · Anglo-Iraqi War; · Battle of Palmyra

Somerset Struben de Chair (22 August 1911 – 5 January 1995) was an English author, politician, wartime soldier, and poet. Mostly themed in topical subjects of recent to classical history, he wrote several novels and a greater mass of non-fiction including in which he drew together as editor three works on Napoleon – spanning French-written memoirs to the French Emperor's novel Souper de Beaucaire.

== Early and personal life ==
De Chair was the younger son of Admiral Sir Dudley de Chair and Enid Struben, daughter of Henry William Struben, of Transvaal, South Africa. The de Chair family were high Huguenots, descending from René de la Chaire, whose grandson, Jean François, Councillor to Charles IX, was created a Marquis in 1600 by Henry IV. This branch of the family prospered through generations of work in the church and interests in farmland and stud farm land. He married firstly, on 8 October 1932, Thelma Grace (1911–1974), daughter of Harold Dennison Arbuthnot, of Merristwood Hall, Worplesdon, Surrey. They had two sons: Rodney Somerset and Peter Dudley. They divorced in 1950.

He then married that year, Mrs (June) Carmen Appleton, daughter of A. G. Bowen, of Brabourne, Kent. They had two sons: Rory and Somerset Carlo, and divorced in 1957. In 1958, de Chair married divorcée Margaret Patricia, daughter of K. E. Field-Hart; they had a daughter, Teresa Loraine Aphrodite (who married Sir Toby Clarke, 6th Baronet). The marriage also ended in divorce in 1974, whereupon he married his fourth wife, divorcée Lady Juliet Wentworth-Fitzwilliam (lately Marchioness of Bristol), only child of Peter Wentworth-Fitzwilliam, 8th Earl Fitzwilliam. They had a daughter, Helena, who married politician, columnist, historian and broadcaster Jacob Rees-Mogg.

Hurdler Lawrence Clarke is a grandson and his sister Theo Clarke an arts expert and MP for one parliamentary term, for Stafford.

== Career ==
Somerset de Chair was educated at The King's School, Parramatta, in New South Wales between 1923 and 1930 before attending Balliol College, Oxford.

He was a Conservative MP for South West Norfolk between 1935 and 1945, losing his seat by 53 votes. He was one of the Conservatives who voted against the government in the Norway Debate in May 1940. He then served as a Parliamentary Private Secretary in 1942–44. De Chair returned to Parliament as MP for Paddington South from 1950 to 1951. Many years later, in 1994, he stood in that year's European Parliament elections as the "Independent Anti European Superstate" candidate for Essex North and Suffolk South, coming in fourth place with 12,409 votes.

Since he had been a cadet in the Officers' Training Corps at Oxford, De Chair qualified for a commission as a Reserve Second Lieutenant of the Life Guards in 1938. He was mobilised on 24 August 1939, a few days before the United Kingdom's entry into World War II. He served as an intelligence officer with the 4th Cavalry Brigade during the Anglo-Iraqi War and the Syrian Campaign where he was wounded on 21 June 1941. Later service was with the General Staff with the rank of Acting Captain.

== Writings ==
De Chair wrote historical non-fiction, a number of now largely neglected novels, one play, three collections of poetry, and several works of autobiography. He also edited two volumes of the memoirs of Napoleon in English.

== Houses and art ==
De Chair was known for his extravagant taste and lived in a series of large country houses. He lived between 1944 and 1949 at Chilham Castle in Kent, and leased Blickling Hall in Norfolk, the former home of the Marquess of Lothian, from the National Trust. He owned St Osyth's Priory in Essex from 1954 until his death in 1995, and also bought Bourne Park House in Kent with his last wife, Lady Juliet Wentworth-Fitzwilliam.

== Bibliography ==
Fiction

- Enter Napoleon (1934)
- Red Tie in the Morning (1936)
- The Teetotalitarian State (1947)
- The Dome of the Rock (1948)
- The Story of a Lifetime (1954)
- Bring Back the Gods (1962)
- Friends, Romans, Concubines (1973)
- The Star of the Wind (1974)
- Legend of the Yellow River (1979)

Non-fiction

- The Impending Storm (1930)
- Divided Europe (1931)
- The Golden Carpet (1943)
- The Silver Crescent (1943)
- Mind on the March (1945)

Edited and translated

- The First Crusade (1945)
- Napoleon's Memoirs (1945)
- Napoleon's Supper at Beaucaire (1945)
- Julius Caesar's Commentaries (1951)
- Napoleon on Napoleon (1992)

Edited

- The Sea is Strong (1961)
- Getty on Getty (1989)

Autobiographies

- Buried Pleasure (1985)
- Morning Glory (1988)
- Die? I Thought I'd Laugh (1993)

Drama

- Peter Public (1932)

Poetry collections

- The Millennium (1949)
- Songs from St. Osyth: The Collected Verse (1970)
- Sounds of Summer (1992)

Parliament of the United Kingdom
Preceded by Alan McLean	Member of Parliament for South West Norfolk; 1935–1945	Succeeded by Sidney Dye
Preceded by Ernest Taylor	Member of Parliament for Paddington South; 1950–1951	Succeeded by Robert Allan
