= Helena Rees-Mogg =

British television personality

The Honourable Lady Rees-Mogg
- Born: Helena Anne Beatrix Wentworth Fitzwilliam de Chair; 1977 (age 48–49)
- Education: University of Bristol (BSc)
- Political party: Conservative
- Spouse: Jacob Rees-Mogg (m. 2007)
- Children: 6
- Parents: Somerset de Chair (father); Lady Juliet Tadgell (mother)
- Relatives: Peter Wentworth-Fitzwilliam, 8th Earl Fitzwilliam (maternal grandfather); Dudley de Chair (paternal grandfather); Lord Nicholas Hervey (half-brother); Lawrence Clarke (half-nephew); Theo Clarke (half-niece)

Helena Anne Beatrix Wentworth Fitzwilliam, Lady Rees-Mogg (née de Chair; born 1977), is a British heiress and television personality. She is married to Sir Jacob Rees-Mogg, former Conservative Member of Parliament for North East Somerset and Secretary of State for Business, Energy and Industrial Strategy.

== Early life and family ==
Rees-Mogg is the only daughter of Conservative MP Somerset de Chair and Lady Juliet Wentworth-Fitzwilliam, the only child and sole heiress of the very wealthy 8th Earl Fitzwilliam (d. 1948), who died in a small aircraft crash when she was aged 13. Also killed was his intended second wife, Kathleen Cavendish, Marchioness of Hartington, a daughter-in-law of the 10th Duke of Devonshire and a sister of U.S. President John F. Kennedy. The de Chair family, settled in England since the end of the seventeenth century, was of Huguenot descent and could trace their ancestry to Rene de la Chaire, whose grandson, Jean de la Chaire, was ennobled as a marquis in 1600 by Henry IV of France. They rose to gentry status through generations of clergy. Her half-brother was Lord Nicholas Hervey. She is the aunt of former Olympic athlete Lawrence Clarke and former Conservative MP Theo Clarke.

She grew up at her family's estate of Bourne Park near Canterbury, Kent.

== Education ==
Rees-Mogg studied chemistry at the University of Bristol. After her studies, she began working for Argus Media as a journalist.

== Family ==
In 2006, she became engaged to the Hon. Jacob Rees-Mogg, future Conservative politician and son of former Times editor Lord Rees-Mogg. She had first met Rees-Mogg when they were children, and they began dating the year before their engagement, after gaining the blessing of her mother. The couple were married at Canterbury Cathedral, Kent, in 2007, in a ceremony at which the post-Vatican II Mass was celebrated in Latin.

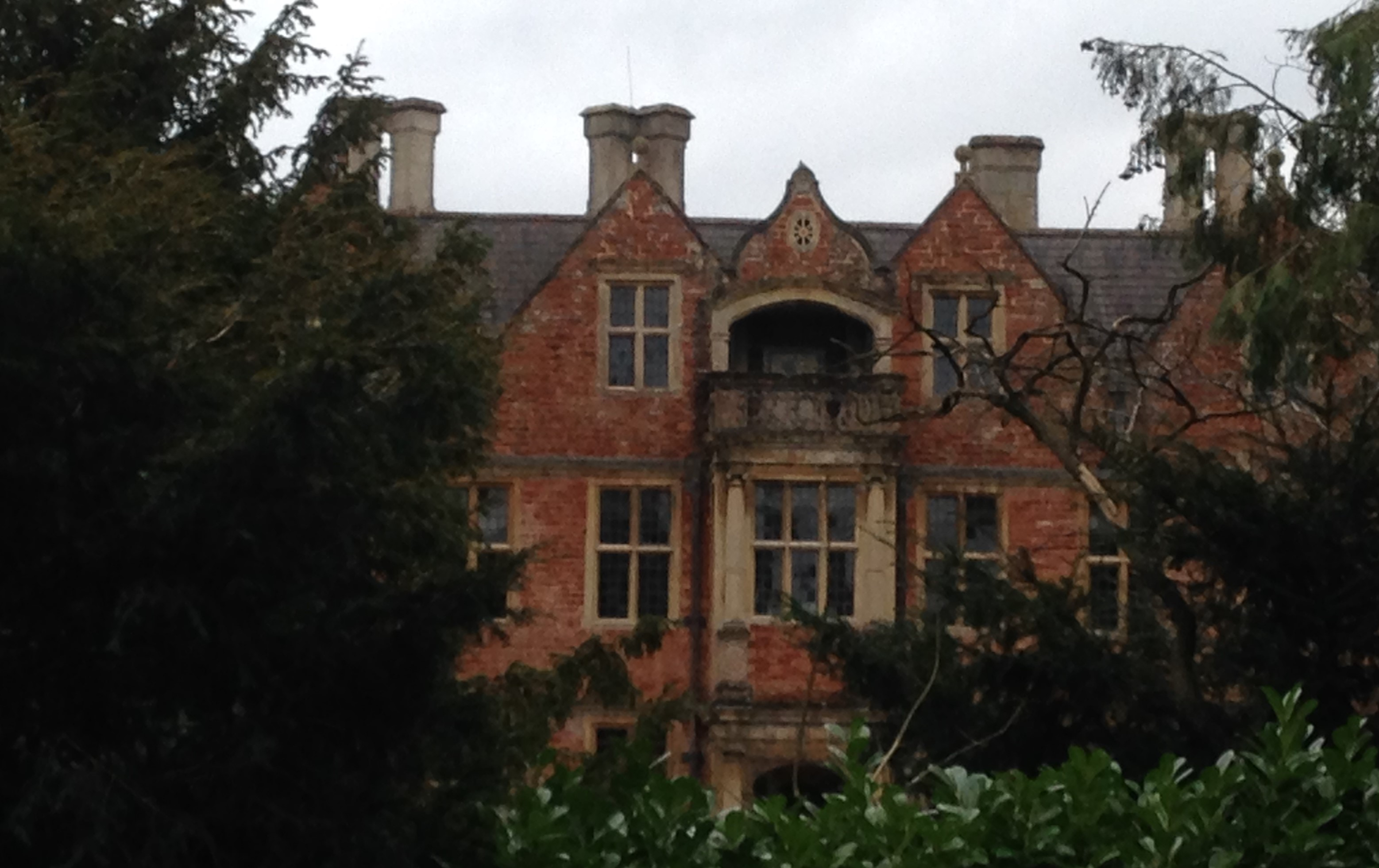
Since 2010, the Rees-Mogg family has lived at Gournay Court in Somerset.

In 2010, the couple purchased the Grade II* listed Gournay Court in West Harptree in Somerset, where they live with their six children: Peter, Mary, Thomas, Anselm, Alfred, and Sixtus.

== Wealth and inheritance ==
Rees-Mogg's mother, Lady Juliet Tadgell, inherited the estates of Rees-Mogg's grandfather, Peter Wentworth-Fitzwilliam, 8th Earl Fitzwilliam, in 1948 when he died in a plane crash at age 38. The estate, with an estimated net worth of £45 million, has since passed into a trust and incorporates Wentworth-Fitzwilliam's vast art collection, including four paintings by George Stubbs and six by Anthony van Dyck, as well as properties in England, Ireland and the United States. Rees-Mogg is the sole heiress to her mother's estate.

== Media ==
Along with her husband and children, Rees-Mogg stars in a reality television show about her family, Meet the Rees-Moggs, which premiered on Discovery+ on 2 December 2024. The season consists of five 40-45 minute long episodes. The show received mixed reviews, with Nick Hilton of The Independent deeming it "toothless, vapid, and not really fair on the kids", while The Guardian's Joel Goldby called it "impeccable reality TV". Lucy Mangan, also for The Guardian, wrote that "Helena quickly becomes the star of the show", claiming she delivers "brutal aperçus at every turn".
