= Nicholas Scott =

British politician

The Right Honourable Sir Nicholas Scott KBE
- Scott during a TV interview in 1996

Minister of State for Social Security
- In office 13 June 1987 – 20 July 1994
- Prime Minister: Margaret Thatcher; John Major
- Preceded by: John Major
- Succeeded by: William Hague

Parliamentary Under-Secretary of State for Northern Ireland
- In office 15 September 1981 – 11 September 1986
- Prime Minister: Margaret Thatcher
- Preceded by: John Patten; David Mitchell
- Succeeded by: Peter Viggers

Member of Parliament for Chelsea
- In office 10 October 1974 – 8 April 1997
- Preceded by: Marcus Worsley
- Succeeded by: Constituency abolished

Member of Parliament for Paddington South
- In office 31 March 1966 – 8 February 1974
- Preceded by: Robert Allan
- Succeeded by: Constituency abolished

Personal details
- Born: 5 August 1933 Edmonton, Middlesex, England
- Died: 6 January 2005 (aged 71) London, England
- Party: Conservative
- Spouses: Elizabeth Robinson (m. 1954; div. 1976) Cecilia Tapsell (m. 1979)
- Children: 5

Sir Nicholas Paul Scott KBE PC (5 August 1933 – 6 January 2005), also known as Nick Scott, was a British Conservative Party politician.

He was a liberal, pro-European Conservative who became President of the Tory Reform Group. During his time in the House of Commons he served in various ministerial roles including for social security and Northern Ireland.

== Early life ==
Scott was born in Edmonton, Middlesex, to an English father, Percival John Scott, a Metropolitan Police officer, and an Irish Catholic mother, Teresa Mary Scott (née Murphy). Nicholas was raised Catholic and attended Catholic schools.

In comparison to many Young Conservatives of Scott's generation who later made it into the cabinet, he stood out as not having gone to Oxbridge. His education was modest: at St Andrew's Catholic Primary in Streatham, then Clapham College, and then, part-time, at the City of London College and the City Literary Institute. He later secured jobs as a salesman, executive or director, first with Shell, then in the printing trade.

== Political career ==
=== 1956–1970 ===
Scott began his political career serving as a councillor on Holborn Borough Council 1956–59 and 1962–65.

Scott contested Islington South West at the 1959 general election and at the 1964 election.

Scott was made national chairman of the Young Conservatives in 1963. He entered the House of Commons on his third attempt, at the 1966 general election. He was returned as Member of Parliament (MP) for the Paddington South constituency, defeating Labour's Conrad Russell.

Scott quickly became one of the stand-out liberal Tory MPs, speaking out against discrimination of foreign students and demanding more nursery education. In 1968 when Labour home secretary James Callaghan proposed immigration limits on the entry of East African Asians with UK passports, Scott swam against the tide and refused to join the Conservative shadow government in supporting the limits. He was one of the first Conservative MPs to speak out against Enoch Powell's 1968 anti-immigration speech.

=== 1970–1975 ===
Scott was a protege of Iain Macleod who made him his parliamentary Private Secretary just one month before Macleod died in 1970. With the advent of the Heath government Scott stuck with his principles opposing the sale of arms to apartheid South Africa.

When his seat was abolished after boundary changes for the February 1974 election, he stood in the new Paddington seat, but lost to the outgoing Paddington North MP Arthur Latham.

Shortly after he lost his parliamentary seat in 1974, Time magazine picked Nicholas Scott as one of its 150 "future world leaders".

In October 1974, Marcus Worsley, the MP for the safe Conservative seat of Chelsea, decided to retire. Scott was selected as the new Conservative candidate, and at the October 1974 general election, he was returned with over 60% of the vote. He immediately took a seat on the opposition front bench as Edward Heath appointed him spokesman on housing.

=== 1975–1986 ===
Scott's prospects were greatly curtailed when Margaret Thatcher won the Conservative Party Leadership race. Thatcher was a proponent of a 'tougher', less liberal Conservatism. Scott was offered a more junior position, he refused to serve and became a rallying point for the "wets" within the party. He did little to appease Thatcher, opposing sending sports teams to apartheid South Africa, he was also a proponent of Proportional Representation, and abstained on new immigration restrictions.

Scott's championing of liberal causes led Labour politician Dick Crossman to describe him as "the most liberal Tory of them all". However, when Roy Jenkins tried to enlist him for the newly formed SDP in 1981, Scott remained loyal to the Conservative party and turned down the invitation.

He was made a Privy Councillor in 1989. A moderate Conservative, he fought to fend off Margaret Thatcher's more radical schemes and was the initial host of "Nick's Diner", the dining club where 'Wets' let off anti-Thatcher steam.

In 1981 when Jim Prior, seen as a leader of the 'wet' Conservatives, was transferred to Northern Ireland by Thatcher, Scott joined him as a junior Minister. Scott took charge of prisons and quickly came under criticism when there was a mass break out from the Maze Prison and faced calls to resign. Prior stood by him, declaring that if Scott was forced to resign he would go as well. Scott became the longest serving minister in Northern Ireland and was rewarded for his service by being made Minister of State.

Scott firmly believed in power sharing in Northern Ireland; this stance made him deeply unpopular with the loyalist element in Northern Ireland, many of whom felt that he had greater sympathy for a united Ireland than he admitted. He was a strong supporter of the Anglo-Irish Agreement, and was held in high regard by the Dublin government and by the SDLP.

=== 1987–1996 ===
In 1987 Scott was moved sideways to the Department of Social Security, and soon became Minister for the Disabled as well. The autonomy he had enjoyed in Northern Ireland away from Thatcher did not continue in this role. Scott made no secret of his disquiet at some of the reforms he was forced to put through. His period as Minister for the Disabled saw him come under attack from many campaigners, including his own daughter, a disability campaigner with RADAR, when on behalf of the Government he 'talked out' the Civil Rights (Disabled Persons) Bill, a private member's bill which aimed to outlaw discrimination on grounds of disability. Opposition MPs called for his resignation over this tactic, and he was forced to apologise for misleading the house. Despite this he could point to provisions for disabled people being over a quarter greater than they had been at the start of the Thatcher government. He was succeeded in this post by William Hague. Appointed a Member of the Order of the British Empire (MBE) in 1964, he was knighted in the same order in 1995.

Scott remained MP for Chelsea until the seat was abolished at the 1997 general election. He was initially selected as the Conservative candidate for the new Kensington and Chelsea constituency, but was subsequently deselected after allegations of alcoholism surfaced following an incident in which he was found passed out in a gutter during the party conference in Bournemouth.

== Cricket ==
Away from politics, Scott was a keen cricketer and widely regarded as a talented opening batsman. He turned out for a number of clubs throughout his career, including MCC, Free Foresters, and the Lords and Commons Cricket team. A Celebration of Lords and Commons Cricket 1850-1988 (1989) rued the fact that a busy political career had kept him away from the crease for far too many matches. Despite this his batting average was impressive: during a 16-year playing career for the Lords and Commons he scored over 2,000 runs, and in 1972 posted an average of 238 runs.

== Personal life ==
Scott was twice married. His first marriage to Elizabeth Robinson, by whom he had a son and two daughters, lasted from 1964 to their divorce in 1976. He married secondly to Hon. Cecilia Ann Tapsell, daughter of Bladen Hawke, 9th Baron Hawke, and had another son and daughter Patrick (Paddy) and Amber.

Scott died in London on 6 January 2005, aged 71. At the time of his death, he had Alzheimer's disease.

== Sources ==
- Wood, Alan H., ed. (1992). The Times Guide to the House of Commons 1992 (first ed.). Times Books. ISBN 978-0723004974.
- Ward, Inna, ed. (2005). Whitaker's Almanack (2006 ed.). A & C Black. ISBN 978-0713670189.

Parliament of the United Kingdom
| Preceded by Robert Allan | Member of Parliament for Paddington South; 1966 – February 1974 | Constituency abolished |
| Preceded by Marcus Worsley | Member of Parliament for Chelsea; October 1974 – 1997 | Constituency abolished |
Political offices
| Preceded by John Major | Minister of State for Social Security (Minister for the Disabled) (post transferred from Dept. of Health & Social Security to Department of Social Security 25 July 1988); 1987–1994 | Succeeded by William Hague |
