= Robert Allan, Baron Allan of Kilmahew =

British Conservative politician

The Right Honourable The Lord Allan of Kilmahew DSO OBE RD
- Allan in 1958

Member of Parliament for Paddington South
- In office 25 October 1951 – 30 March 1966
- Preceded by: Somerset de Chair
- Succeeded by: Nicholas Scott

Personal details
- Born: 11 July 1914
- Died: 4 April 1979 (aged 64)
- Party: Conservative
- Children: Sir Alex Allan
- Education: Clare College, Cambridge
- Occupation: Businessman, politician, and naval officer

Military service
- Allegiance: United Kingdom
- Branch/service: Royal Naval Volunteer Reserve
- Years of service: 1939–1946
- Rank: Commander
- Battles/wars: World War II
- Awards: Companion of the Distinguished Service Order; Officer of the Order of the British Empire; Decoration for Officers of the Royal Naval Reserve; Mentioned in Despatches; Commander of the Legion of Honour (France); Croix de guerre (France); Legion of Merit (United States)

Robert Alexander Allan, Baron Allan of Kilmahew, DSO, OBE, RD (11 July 1914 – 4 April 1979) was a British Conservative politician.

Allan was educated at Harrow School, Clare College, Cambridge and Yale University. He served in the Royal Naval Volunteer Reserve during World War II and was appointed an officer of the Order of the British Empire (OBE) in 1942, a Companion of the Distinguished Service Order (DSO) in 1944, and was awarded the French Croix de guerre.

Allan was Member of Parliament (MP) for Paddington South between 1951 and 1966. In 1958 and 1959, he was also Financial Secretary to the Admiralty.

On 16 July 1973, he was created a life peer as Baron Allan of Kilmahew, of Cardross in the County of Dunbartonshire.

His son Sir Alex Allan is a former senior civil servant, who served as chairman of the Joint Intelligence Committee.

Parliament of the United Kingdom
Preceded by Somerset de Chair	Member of Parliament for Paddington South; 1951–1966	Succeeded by Nicholas Scott
