= Empire Free Trade Crusade =

Defunct British political party

- Founder: Lord Beaverbrook
- Founded: July 1929
- Dissolved: Late 1930s (did not contest elections after 1931)
- Youth wing: Young Crusaders
- Ideology: Free trade Imperial Preference

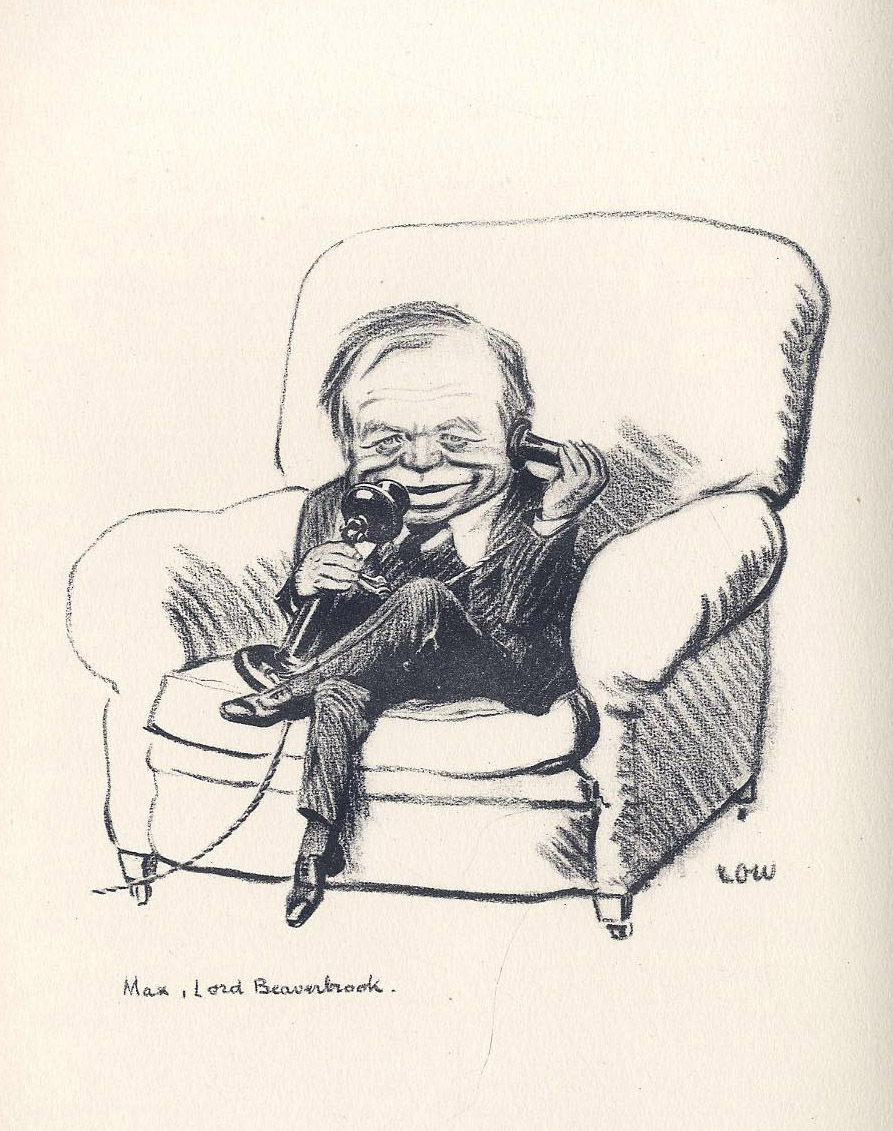
Caricature of Lord Beaverbrook by David Low, 1928

The Empire Free Trade Crusade was a political party in the United Kingdom. It was founded by Max Aitken, 1st Baron Beaverbrook in July 1929 to press for the British Empire to become a free trade bloc.

The group was founded to oppose both the Labour minority government, elected in 1929, and Conservative leader Stanley Baldwin's protectionist policies, which they viewed as an insufficient answer to their demands for "fiscal union of the Empire" (with stiff barriers against goods from rival trade blocs), a more extreme version of Imperial Preference.

Beaverbrook began enrolling members at the end of 1929, after concluding that Baldwin would not be won over to his aim. In 1930, he briefly joined Lord Rothermere's United Empire Party, and the two parties worked together thereafter.

A party youth group for under-25s, the Young Crusaders, was launched on 16 April 1930 in London.

In October 1930, Ernest Taylor stood for the party in the Paddington South by-election, winning a previously safe Conservative seat. A second candidate in the 1931 Westminster St George's by-election was beaten by the Conservatives. This began a decline for the group, accelerated when Taylor joined the Conservative Party after it won the 1931 UK general election. Beaverbrook maintained the group until the late 1930s, but it did not contest any further elections.
