= Dorothy Evans (trade unionist) =

British trade union leader

Dorothy Evans (1893 – 22 September 1943) was a British trade union leader.

== Life ==
Born in Stockport, Evans was educated at Stockport High School, then studied at the University of Manchester. From 1918 to 1931, she served as general secretary of the Association of Women Clerks and Secretaries (AWCS), and through this was active at the Trades Union Congress, serving on the Standing Joint Committee of Working Women's Organisations.

In her spare time, Evans studied to become a barrister, and was called to the bar in 1925. Despite this, she remained a trade union official. Also active in the Labour Party, she stood unsuccessfully in the 1930 Paddington South by-election.

In 1931, Evans left the AWCS and became secretary of the National Association of Women Civil Servants. She died in 1943, following a long illness.

Trade union offices
Preceded by ?	General Secretary of the Association of Women Clerks and Secretaries; 1918 – 1931	Succeeded by Anne Godwin
