= Henry Percy Harris =

British politician (1856–1941)

Portrait by Walter Stoneman, 1917

Sir Henry Percy Harris KBE (8 September 1856 - 23 August 1941) was a British Conservative Party politician who served first on the London County Council, and then as a Member of Parliament.

Henry Percy Harris was born on 8 September 1856, the son of Sir George David Harris, a member of the London County Council from its creation in January 1889. Henry Harris was educated at Eton College and Christ Church, Oxford University, before qualifying as a barrister in 1881.

Like his father, Henry Harris served on the London County Council, he representing Paddington from 1892 to 1910. He was deputy chairman of the Council between 1898–1899 and chairman between 1907 and 1908. He was among the Council group allied to the Conservative Party, first known as the Moderate Party then, from 1906, the Municipal Reform Party. From 1904 he led the group and later became chairman of the related London Municipal Society.

Harris was elected as Conservative and Unionist Member of Parliament (MP) for Paddington South at the general elections of January and December 1910. In the 1918 general election he stood as a Conservative supporter of David Lloyd George's coalition Government and was re-elected unopposed. He then retired from Parliament and did not contest the 1922 general election.

In 1917 he was appointed a Knight Commander (KBE) of the Order of the British Empire for his services as Chairman of the London War Pensions Committee.

He died on 23 August 1941 at the age of 84.

Parliament of the United Kingdom
Preceded by George Fardell	Member of Parliament for Paddington South; Jan 1910–1922	Succeeded by Douglas King
