= Association of Women Clerks and Secretaries =

Former trade union of the United Kingdom

The Association of Women Clerks and Secretaries (AWCS) was a British trade union from 1912 to 1941.

== History ==
The union formed in 1903 as the Association of Shorthand Writers and Typists and changed its name in 1912 to AWCS. It grew, partly because of World War I, from fewer than 900 members in 1916 to around 8000 in 1920. It became a member of the Trades Union Congress in 1919.

Anne Godwin joined the union in 1920 and became its main organizer in 1928.

In 1941 AWCS merged with the National Union of Clerks and Administrative Workers to form the Clerical and Administrative Workers Union.

== General Secretaries ==
1911: Florence
1916: Mabel Basnett
1918: Dorothy Evans
1931: Anne Godwin

== Archives ==
Records of the AWCS are kept in the London Metropolitan University's Trades Union Congress Library Collections.

== Further research ==
- Arthur Marsh; Victoria Ryan. 1997. The Clerks: a history of APEX, 1890-1989. Malthouse P.
- Historical Directory of Trade Unions, vol 1, pg. 46
