= Activation (disambiguation) =

Activation, in chemistry and biology, is the process whereby something is prepared or excited for a subsequent reaction.

It may also refer to:

- Product activation, a step in a software installation process
- Marketing activation, a phase in the marketing process
- Subroutine, the calling of a subroutine
- Neutron activation, induction of radioactivity by neutron radiation

== See also ==
- Activate
- Activator
