= Asian Sponsorship Association =

Singapore-based non-profit organisation

- Headquarters: Singapore
- Website: Asian Sponsorship Association

The Asian Sponsorship Association (ASA) is a non-profit organisation based in Singapore. It was established to improve sponsorship practices across Asia and promote the region’s role in the global sponsorship industry by enhancing knowledge, transparency, and investment efficiency.

== History ==
In September 2013, a decision was made by 150 industry professionals to create the Association and it has since been incorporated in Singapore in December 2013

It aims to address a lack of growth in the industry across Asia. According to specialist research agencies, Asia represents between 23% of the global sponsorship market (source: IEG, owned by GroupM of the WPP group) and 14% (source: Asia Sponsorship News, a privately owned consultancy) yet it holds 60% of the world's consumer base

This is caused by several factors:

- lack of experience among sponsors. Sponsorship is a new communications medium in Asia so as such brands are more used to older communication means - TV advertising, Print advertising, Out-of-home advertising etc. This results in a) a fear of investing into an unknown medium and b) little activation of a sponsorship campaign in other communication channels.
- not enough stakeholders have commissioned measurement research to prove the ROI (Return on Investment) of sponsorship marketing. Therefore sponsors don't invest
- few specialist research providers exist to cover the ground
- too much "Chairman's Choice" where the company head mandates that his/her company sponsors an event/celebrity etc. for less-than-commercial reasons
- lack of pricing transparency and benchmarks

Specialist service providers have been secured by the ASA to support its members. One such company is Asia Sponsorship News, or ASN. ASN is a market intelligence consultancy, operating since 2007, which distributes news, analytics and insights on a subscription basis, with a bespoke consultancy and training service. ASN's data allows sponsorship professionals trade faster and more efficiently in an environment of greater transparency.

The ASA also has 15 founding organisations to help advise the Association on its direction - these include HSBC, Google, Fox International Channels, Singapore Sports Council, Yum Group and many other blue-chip corporations. The ASA aims to be fully operational in Q2-2014 and will be based in Singapore
