= Jacob Rees-Mogg =

British politician (born 1969)

The Right Honourable Sir Jacob Rees-Mogg
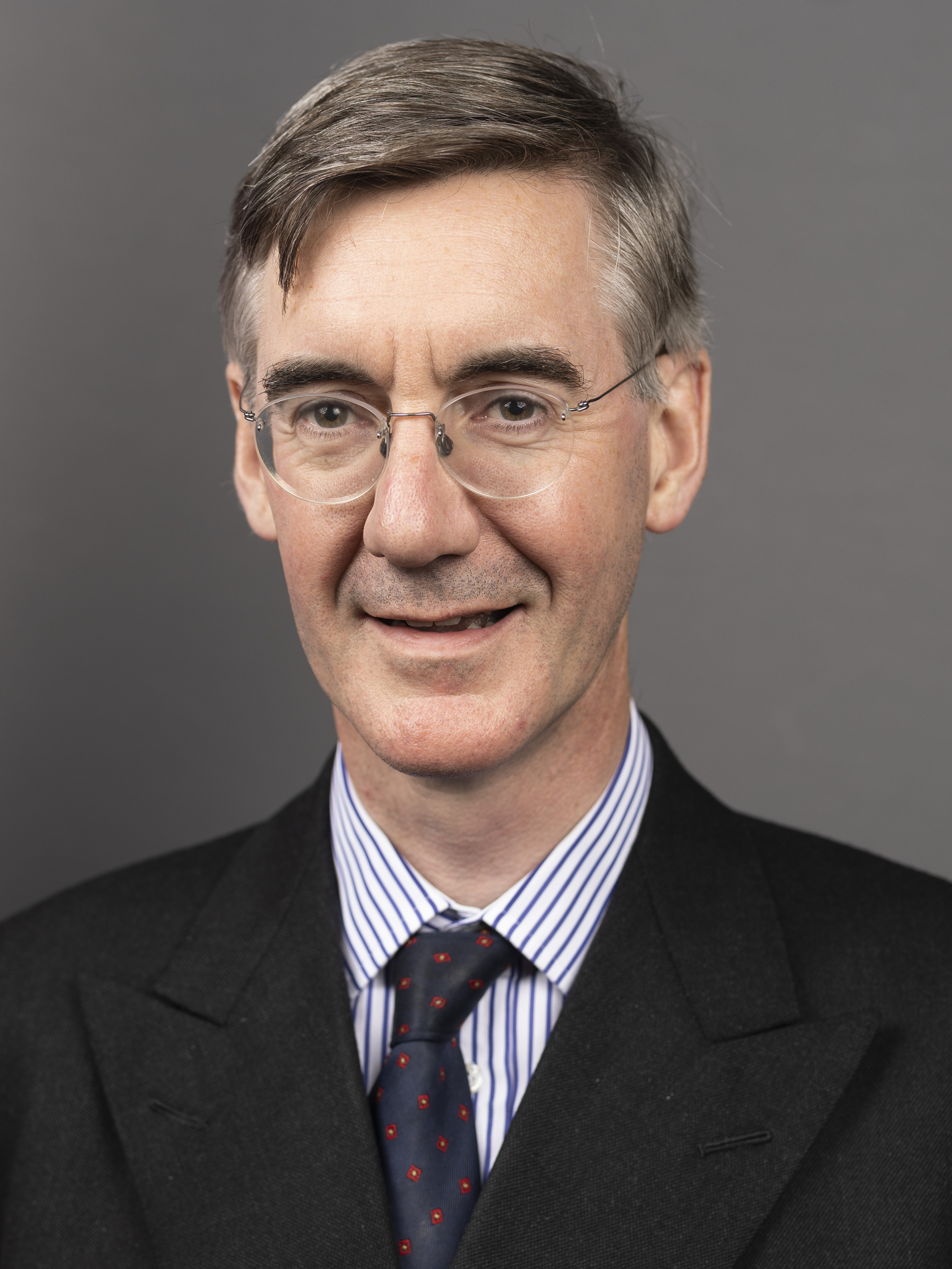
- Official portrait, 2022

Secretary of State for Business, Energy and Industrial Strategy
- In office 6 September 2022 – 25 October 2022
- Prime Minister: Liz Truss
- Preceded by: Kwasi Kwarteng
- Succeeded by: Grant Shapps

Minister of State for Brexit Opportunities and Government Efficiency
- In office 8 February 2022 – 6 September 2022
- Prime Minister: Boris Johnson
- Preceded by: The Lord Agnew of Oulton
- Succeeded by: Office abolished

Leader of the House of Commons Lord President of the Council
- In office 24 July 2019 – 8 February 2022
- Prime Minister: Boris Johnson
- Preceded by: Mel Stride
- Succeeded by: Mark Spencer

Chair of the European Research Group
- In office 9 January 2018 – 3 September 2019
- Deputy: Michael Tomlinson; Steve Baker; Mark Francois
- Preceded by: Suella Braverman
- Succeeded by: Steve Baker

Member of Parliament for North East Somerset
- In office 6 May 2010 – 30 May 2024
- Preceded by: Constituency established
- Succeeded by: Constituency abolished

Personal details
- Born: Jacob William Rees-Mogg; 24 May 1969 (age 57) Hammersmith, London, England
- Party: Conservative
- Spouse: Helena de Chair (m. 2007)
- Children: 6
- Parent: William Rees-Mogg (father)
- Relatives: Annunziata Rees-Mogg (sister)
- Education: Trinity College, Oxford (BA)
- Occupation: Politician; businessman; broadcaster
- Website: jacobreesmogg.com

Sir Jacob William Rees-Mogg (/riːs mɒɡ/; born 24 May 1969) is a British politician, businessman and broadcaster who served as the member of Parliament (MP) for North East Somerset from 2010 to 2024. A member of the Conservative Party, he served as Leader of the House of Commons and Lord President of the Council from 2019 to 2022. He also served as Minister of State for Brexit Opportunities and Government Efficiency from February to September 2022, and Secretary of State for Business, Energy and Industrial Strategy from September to October 2022. Rees-Mogg previously chaired the eurosceptic European Research Group (ERG) from 2018 to 2019 and has been associated with socially conservative views.

Rees-Mogg's hedge fund management business Somerset Capital Management allowed him to amass a significant fortune, estimated in 2016 at between £55 million and £150 million. Rees-Mogg unsuccessfully contested the 1997 and 2001 general elections before being elected as the MP for North East Somerset in 2010. He was reelected in 2015 and 2017, with an increased share of the vote each time, as well as in 2019, with a smaller share of the vote. Within the Conservative Party, he has joined the traditionalist and socially conservative Cornerstone Group.

During the premiership of David Cameron, Rees-Mogg was one of the Conservative Party's most rebellious MPs, opposing the whips on a number of issues. He became known for filibustering. A Eurosceptic, he proposed an electoral pact between the Conservatives and the UK Independence Party (UKIP) and campaigned for the UK to leave the European Union in the 2016 referendum. A member of the European Research Group (ERG), Rees-Mogg was elected its chairman in 2018. He attracted support for his opposition to the Chequers Agreement and Prime Minister Theresa May's proposed Brexit withdrawal agreement. He was promoted as a potential successor to May as Leader of the Conservative Party; he instead endorsed Boris Johnson in the 2019 leadership contest. Following Johnson's election as Conservative Leader and appointment as Prime Minister he appointed Rees-Mogg Leader of the House of Commons and Lord President of the Council. In February 2022, Rees-Mogg was moved by Johnson to the role of Minister of State for Brexit Opportunities and Government Efficiency. After Johnson resigned in July 2022, Rees-Mogg supported Liz Truss's bid to become Conservative leader. Following Truss's appointment as prime minister, she appointed Rees-Mogg as Business Secretary. He resigned as Business Secretary shortly after Truss left office on 25 October 2022. He was defeated at the 2024 general election, losing to the Labour Party's candidate, Dan Norris.

Rees-Mogg has been described as a conviction politician with anachronistic attitudes. Critics view him as a reactionary figure; his traditionalist attitudes have been characterised as obscuring controversial political views, some of which have made him the target of organised protests. His anachronistic style caused him to be dubbed the "Honourable Member for the 18th century". Since early 2023, Rees-Mogg has presented his own show for GB News.

== Life and career ==
=== Early life and education ===
Jacob William Rees-Mogg was born on 24 May 1969 in Hammersmith, London, the younger son of William Rees-Mogg (1928–2012), who was editor of The Times newspaper and was made a life peer in 1988, and his wife Gillian Shakespeare Morris, formerly his secretary, daughter of Thomas Richard Morris, a lorry driver, car salesman, local government politician, and Conservative mayor of St Pancras in London. He is a descendant of the Rees-Mogg family of Cholwell, Cameley. He is one of five children; his younger sister is Annunziata Mary Rees-Mogg.

In 1964 the family purchased Ston Easton Park, a country house near the village of Ston Easton in Somerset, where Rees-Mogg grew up attending weekly mass and Sunday school at the Roman Catholic Church of the Holy Ghost, Midsomer Norton. He started catechism in 1975 here under his governess and attended ordinary form mass. A few years later, in 1978, the family moved to the nearby village of Hinton Blewett where they purchased The Old Rectory, a Grade II listed former rectory. Living in Somerset, he regularly travelled to his family's second home in Smith Square, London, where he attended prep school at the private Westminster Under School.

Growing up, Rees-Mogg was primarily raised by the family's nanny Veronica Crook, whom he describes as a formative figure. Crook came to work for the family in 1965 to look after Rees-Mogg's older siblings, and later looked after Rees-Mogg's own children; in 2021 she had worked for the family for 56 years.

At age nine he made his first will and testament, and at thirteen he opened a Coutts bank account. When Rees-Mogg was ten, he was left £50 by a distant cousin, and his father, on his behalf, invested in shares in the now-defunct General Electric Company (GEC). Rees-Mogg said this event was the beginning of his interest in stock markets. Having learned how to read company reports and balance sheets, he later attended a shareholders' meeting at GEC, where he voted against a motion because dividends were too low. He subsequently invested in London-based conglomerate Lonrho, eventually owning 340 shares, and reportedly caused the company's chairman Lord Duncan-Sandys "discomfort" by quizzing him at an annual general meeting on the low dividends offered to shareholders. In 1981, at a shareholders' meeting of GEC, in which he owned 175 shares at the time, he told the chairman Lord Nelson that the dividend on offer was "pathetic", sparking amusement among board members and the media.

After prep school, Rees-Mogg entered Eton College, where he was described in a school report as a "particularly dogmatic" Thatcherite. Upon leaving Eton, he had his portrait painted by Paul Brason, a member of the Royal Society of Portrait Painters, for the Eton College Collections, which was later put on display during the Faces of 1993 Royal Society of Portrait Painters exhibition.

Rees-Mogg read history as an undergraduate student at Trinity College of the University of Oxford, graduating with upper second-class honours in 1991. Almost immediately after arriving in 1988, he was nominated by Cherwell for the title of "Pushy Fresher", printing a photograph of open-mouthed Rees-Mogg in a suit with the caption "What more need we say?". While at Oxford, he became president of the Oxford University Conservative Association with what Cherwell described as a "campaign for world domination and social adequacy". Rees-Mogg was a member and frequent debater at the Oxford Union and elected Librarian, but Damian Hinds defeated him for president of the Union. Reflecting on his time at university, Rees-Mogg regretted not having studied Classics.

=== Career ===
After graduating from Oxford in 1991, Rees-Mogg worked for J Rothschild Investment Management under Nils Taube before moving to Hong Kong in 1993 to join Lloyd George Management. During his tenure in Hong Kong, he became a close friend of its Governor Chris Patten and was a regular at Government House. Three years later, he returned to London and was put in charge of some of the firm's emerging markets funds. By 2003, he was managing a newly established Lloyd George Emerging Markets Fund. In 2007, Rees-Mogg left the company with a number of colleagues to set up their own fund management firm, Somerset Capital Management, with the aid of hedge fund manager Crispin Odey. Following Rees-Mogg's election as a Member of Parliament, he stepped down as chief executive of the company; however, he continues to receive income in his capacity as a partner.

In 2018, Somerset Capital opened an investment fund in Dublin in order to be legally able to continue to have European retail investors after Brexit. The new business prospectus listed Brexit as one of the risks, as it could cause "considerable uncertainty". Rees-Mogg, who remains a partner of the business but does not manage the funds nor make investment decisions, stated: "The decision to launch the fund was nothing whatsoever to do with Brexit."

Rees-Mogg's wealth has been estimated to be in excess of £100 million when combined with his wife's expected inheritance, which, according to The Guardian, has left him open to the criticism that he cannot understand the lives and concerns of many ordinary people. When interviewed by Channel 4 in March 2019, Rees-Mogg declined to answer suggestions that their calculations showed that he could have earned £7 million in the period since the referendum. In July 2019, Rees-Mogg resigned from his part-time role at Somerset Capital Management following his appointment as Leader of the House of Commons.

=== Parliamentary candidate and other roles ===
Rees-Mogg first entered politics at the 1997 general election at which, aged 27, he was selected as the Conservative Party candidate for Central Fife, a traditional Labour seat in Scotland. With an upper-class background on his father's side set against a predominantly working-class electorate, and having been described as being "so posh, it's as if he has been transported in time from a previous century", he caused some bewilderment among locals by canvassing the area with his family's nanny and touring the constituency in a Bentley, a claim that he later described as "scurrilous", stating it had been a Mercedes. With a name recognition of less than 2%, Rees-Mogg received 9% of the votes cast, a figure much lower than that of previous Conservative Party candidates for the area. However, no new Conservative MPs were elected in Scotland that year; the Conservative Party suffered its worst electoral defeat since 1906, and lost all its seats in Scotland.

In 1999, when it was being rumoured that his "anachronistically posh" accent was working against his chances of being selected for a safe Conservative seat, Rees-Mogg was defended by letter writers to The Daily Telegraph, one of whom claimed that "an overt form of intimidation exists, directed against anyone who dares to eschew the current, Americanised, mode of behaviour, speech and dress". Rees-Mogg himself stated (in The Sunday Times, 23 May 1999) that "it is rather pathetic to fuss about accents too much", though he then went on to say that "John Prescott's accent certainly stereotypes him as an oaf", a comment which he later said he regretted and for which he apologised. He later said: "I gradually realised that whatever I happened to be speaking about, the number of voters in my favour dropped as soon as I opened my mouth."

Rees-Mogg was selected as the Conservative candidate for The Wrekin in Shropshire for the 2001 general election, but lost to the sitting Labour MP Peter Bradley. In 2004, Rees-Mogg sought to be a parliamentary candidate in Kensington and Chelsea for the 2005 general election. However, he didn't get shortlisted. Later that year, he sought to be a candidate in Surrey Heath. He was shortlisted for the seat. However, Michael Gove was selected instead. From 2005 to 2008, he was the elected Chairman of the Cities of London and Westminster Conservative Association.

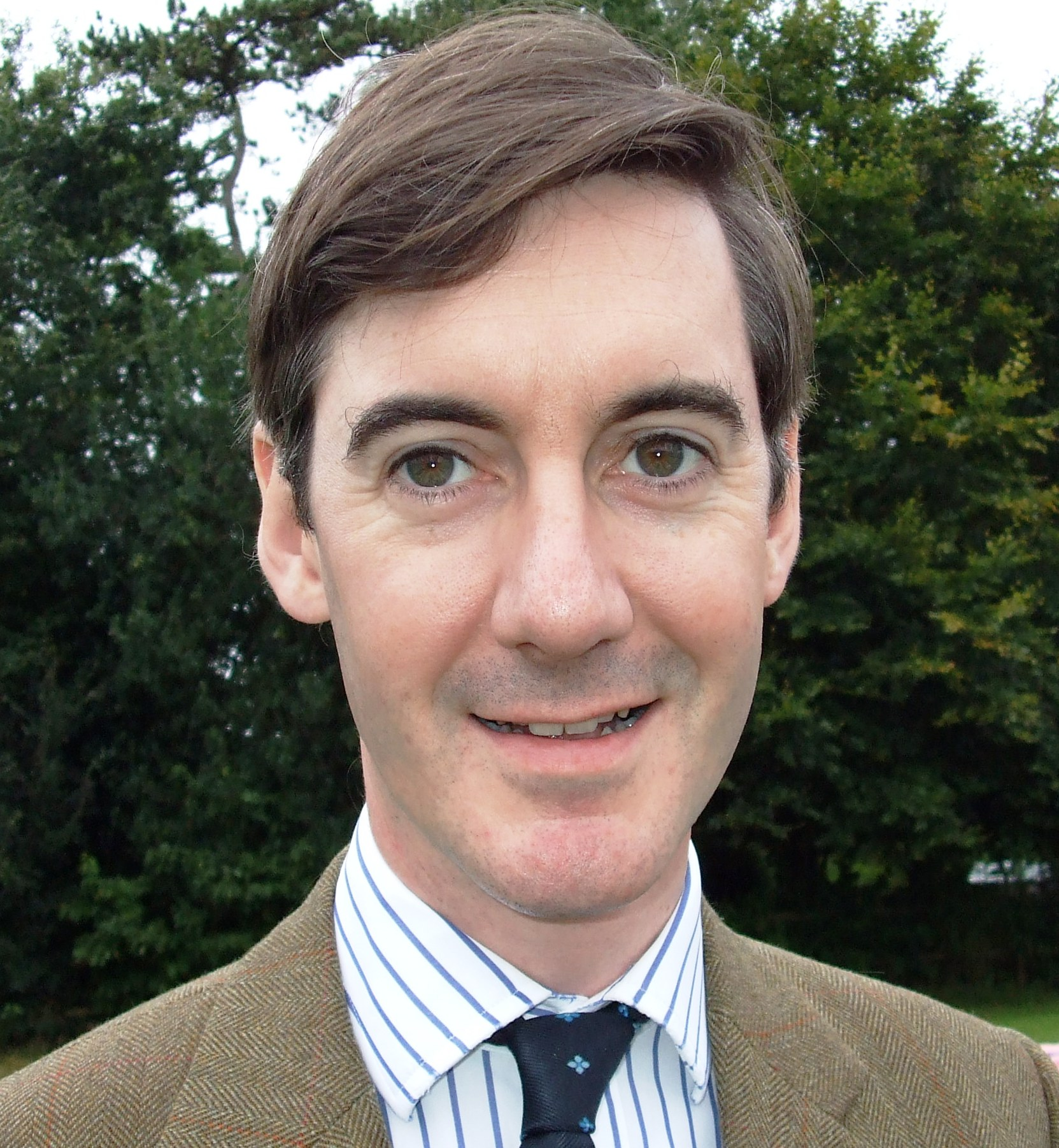
Rees-Mogg in 2007

In 2006, Rees-Mogg criticised efforts by then-Leader of the Conservative Party David Cameron to increase the representation of ethnic minorities on the party candidate list, arguing that fulfilling quotas can often "make it harder for the intellectually able" and that "Ninety-five per cent of this country is White. The list can't be totally different from the country at large."

In March 2009, Rees-Mogg was forced to apologise to Trevor Kavanagh, the then political editor of The Sun, after it was shown that a newsletter signed by Rees-Mogg had plagiarised sections of a Kavanagh article that had appeared in the newspaper over a month earlier.

In December 2009, a pamphlet which purported to show him talking to a local constituent and calling on the government to "show more honesty" was criticised after it emerged that the "constituent" was a London-based employee of his investment firm.

He was one of the directors of the Catholic Hospital of St John and St Elizabeth in London who were ordered to resign by Cardinal Cormac Murphy-O'Connor in February 2008, after protracted arguments over the adoption of a tighter ethical code banning non-Catholic practices such as abortions and gender reassignment surgery at the hospital.

== Political career ==
Rees-Mogg was described by Camilla Long in a profile in The Sunday Times as "David Cameron's worst nightmare" during the 2010 general election campaign. At that election, Rees-Mogg became the new Member of Parliament for the new North East Somerset constituency, winning a majority of 4,914 votes. His sister, journalist Annunziata Rees-Mogg, stood simultaneously in neighbouring Somerton and Frome, but failed by 1,817 votes to win her seat. In The Guardian, Ian Jack had claimed that the selection of two such highly privileged candidates had damaged the Conservative Party's message of social inclusion.

Select committee memberships
Committee	Date
Advisory Committee on Works of Art	18 November 2010 to 30 March 2015; 1 July 2015 to 17 November 2015
European Scrutiny Committee	26 July 2010 to 30 March 2015; 15 July 2015 to 3 May 2017
Joint Committee on the Palace of Westminster	16 July 2015 to 3 May 2017
Procedure Committee	26 July 2010 to 30 March 2015
Treasury Select Committee	8 July 2015 to 3 May 2017
Exiting the European Union Select Committee	11 September 2017 to 6 November 2019

=== Cameron government (2010–2016) ===
In 2010 the ConservativeHome blog rated Rees-Mogg as one of the Conservatives' most rebellious MPs. He later voted against the government whip on the Fixed-term Parliaments Bill, the October 2011 European Union Referendum Motion and the House of Lords Reform Bill 2012.

In the House of Commons, Rees-Mogg gained a reputation for his humorous speeches and ability to filibuster. He helped filibuster the Daylight Saving Bill 2010–12 and the Sustainable Livestock Bill 2010–12, thus preventing their passage through Parliament. In his long speech on the Sustainable Livestock Bill, he recited poetry, spoke of the superior quality of Somerset eggs, and mentioned the Empress of Blandings, a fictional pig who won silver at the Shropshire County Show three years in a row, before moving on to talk about the sewerage system and the Battle of Agincourt. He also jokingly attempted to amend the Daylight Saving Bill to give the county of Somerset its own time zone, fifteen minutes behind London.

In a December 2011 debate on London Local Authorities Bill, he said that council officials with the power to issue on-the-spot fines should be made to wear bowler hats. In February 2012, he used the word "floccinaucinihilipilification"—meaning "the habit of considering as worthless"—during a parliamentary debate; it was noted as the longest word then uttered on the floor of the House of Commons.

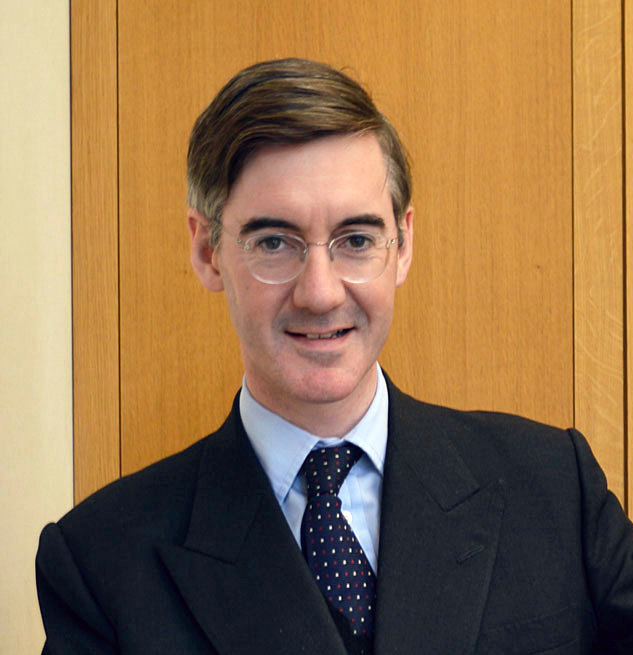
Rees-Mogg in 2013

In May 2013, he addressed the annual dinner held by the Traditional Britain Group, a far-right group that calls for non-white Britons to be deported. Rees-Mogg had been informed as to the nature of the group by anti-fascist group Searchlight prior to his attendance. After the dinner, he informed the press that although he had been informed of the group's views, he had "never been a member or supporter" of them.

In January 2014, he dismissed the sum of £250,000 spent on MPs' portraits as trivial by saying "I'm all for saving money, saving money right, left and centre, but this is chicken feed". In December 2014, Rees-Mogg was reported to the Independent Parliamentary Standards Authority for speaking in debates on tobacco, mining, and oil and gas without first verbally declaring he was a founding partner and director of Somerset Capital, which manages multimillion-pound investments in these sectors. The Parliamentary Commissioner for Standards, Kathryn Hudson, decided that no wrongdoing had been committed and thus no investigation would take place. According to The Daily Telegraph, Rees-Mogg's extra-parliamentary work took up 476 hours, or 9 hours per week, in 2014.

=== May government (2016–2019) ===
After David Cameron resigned due to the United Kingdom's vote to leave the European Union, the Conservatives had a leadership election in which Rees-Mogg initially supported Boris Johnson. After Johnson chose not to run, Rees-Mogg endorsed Michael Gove and after Gove was eliminated he backed Andrea Leadsom. Leadsom then withdrew, which meant that Theresa May became Conservative leader and Prime Minister.

Rees-Mogg supported the then-Republican Party nominee Donald Trump during the 2016 U.S. presidential election. In October 2016, when the Donald Trump Access Hollywood tape surfaced, he distanced himself from Trump's Twitter messages, saying that Twitter was "fundamentally trivial". In May 2018 he wrote an article for The Times titled 'Trump Will Be Our Greatest Ally After Brexit', saying that he "appealed to voters left behind by the metropolitan elite and he exudes confidence about his own nation and a determination not to be a manager of decline, which also inspires the Brexiteers".

In November 2017, Rees-Mogg met Trump's former White House Chief Strategist and Breitbart News' executive chairman Steve Bannon to discuss how right-wing movements can succeed in the United Kingdom and the United States. Rees-Mogg later defended the meeting when asked about it in an interview, stating, "I've talked to any number of people whose political views I do not share or fully endorse. ... Inevitably politicians meet other politicians. Mr Bannon was the chief of staff to President Trump and is a senior figure in the Republican Party."

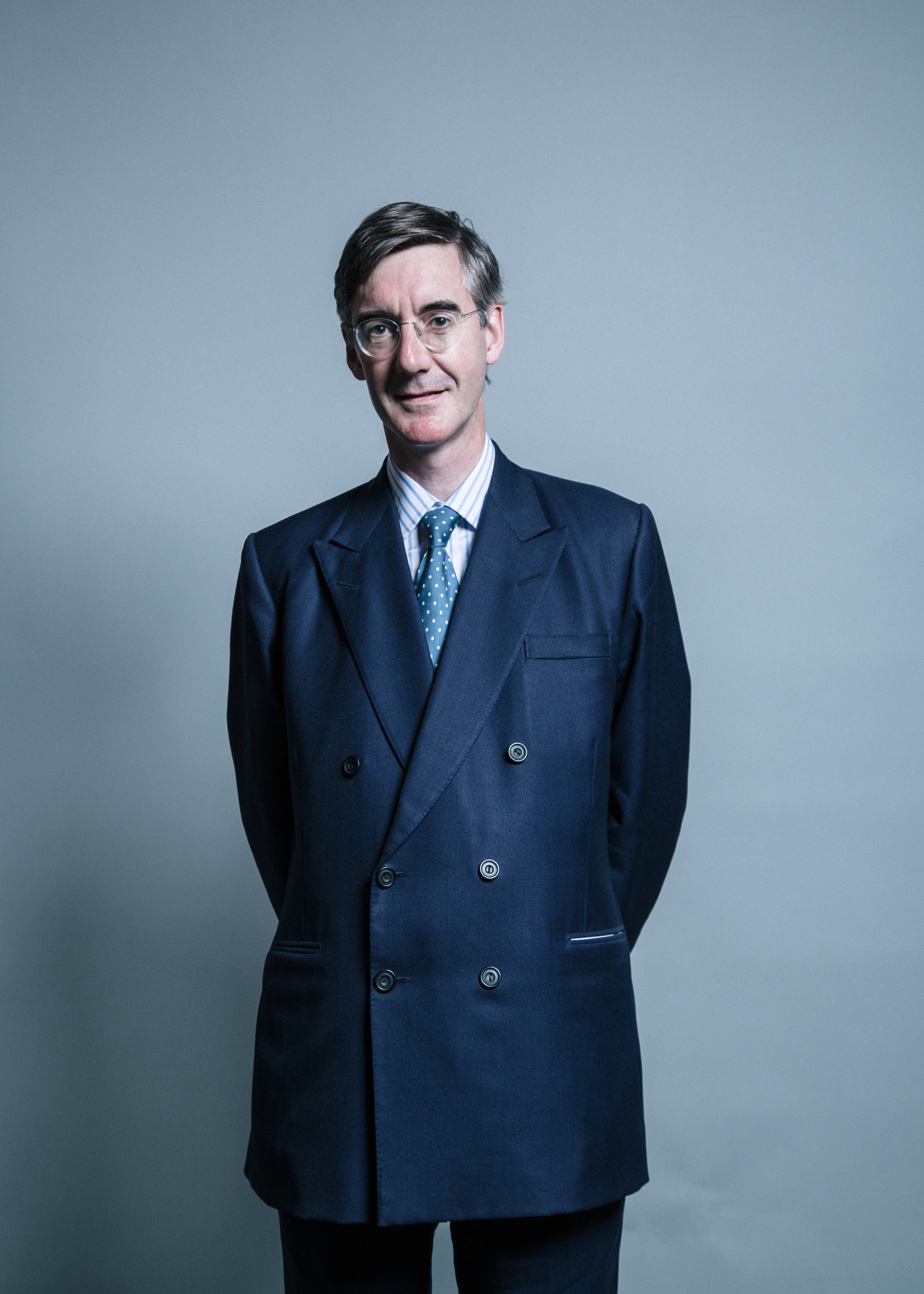
Rees-Mogg's official parliamentary portrait, 2017

In 2017, he supported the confidence and supply agreement made between the Conservative Party and the Democratic Unionist Party (DUP). He later addressed a DUP fundraising event, drawing criticism from the Northern Ireland Conservatives.

Rees-Mogg was widely regarded as a potential candidate for the leadership of his party, something he was reportedly considering during 2017. On 13 August 2017, however, Rees-Mogg said that such speculation was "part of media's silly season". Two Conservative MPs, Heidi Allen and Anna Soubry, announced that they would leave the party if he became leader; another, Justine Greening, suggested she could do the same. However, other Conservative MPs, such as Jesse Norman and Daniel Kawczynski have expressed support for a prospective Rees-Mogg leadership bid. Former UKIP leader Nigel Farage also backed a potential Rees-Mogg candidacy.

Following the 2017 general election, calls were made for Theresa May to step down as Prime Minister and leader of the Conservative Party after failing to win an overall majority in the House of Commons. This led news outlets to begin speculating on May's possible successor with Boris Johnson touted as the bookmakers' favourite and Rees-Mogg being given 50/1 odds. A day after the election on 9 June, an online petition, titled Ready for Rees-Mogg, was set up urging Rees-Mogg to run for leader of the Conservative Party. Hoping to mirror the success of pro-Corbyn activist group Momentum, a hashtag of Moggmentum was created. By 8 July 2017, the campaign had attracted over 13,000 signatures and raised £2,000 in donations with leadership odds being cut to 16/1, making him second favourite behind David Davis. On 14 August, co-founder of Ready for Rees-Mogg Sam Frost announced the petition had gathered 22,000 registered supporters, 700 volunteers and £7,000 in donations, despite Rees-Mogg having said a day earlier that such speculation was "part of media's silly season" and that "no-body serious" believed he was a candidate. On 5 September 2017, a poll conducted by ConservativeHome put Rees-Mogg as the favourite for next leader, with 23% of the votes based on 1,309 people surveyed.

Rees-Mogg was elected chair of the European Research Group, a Eurosceptic pressure group within the Conservative Party, in January 2018. A report in The Independent suggested that this position provided him with the immediate support of around 50 Conservative MPs, a sufficient number to trigger a leadership contest. Since then, Rees-Mogg directly criticised the leadership of May and chancellor Philip Hammond, fuelling more rumours that he was planning to stand for the leadership but reiterated he had no intention of doing so. In February, a speech that Rees-Mogg was giving at the University of the West of England was disrupted when left wing protesters accused him of being a racist and a bigot; violence broke out between the protesters and Mogg's supporters.

A supporter of "hard Brexit" (although he prefers the term "clean Brexit"), Rees-Mogg was highly critical of the government's handling of the Brexit negotiations, in particular Theresa May's "Chequers deal", calling it "staying in the EU without a vote":

The prime minister needs to look at what she herself has said, the promises she has made, the commitments of the last election, and see if they square with Chequers—and in my view they do not. If she sticks with Chequers, she will find she has a block of votes against her in the House of Commons. ... Of course the Eurosceptics in parliament are not in a majority on all issues, but we will inevitably be in a majority on some of them and that will make the legislation extraordinarily difficult if it is based on Chequers.

He supported a "Canada-plus" deal as a compromise; this would allow for tariff-free trade, without the UK remaining in the single market or the customs union.

In 2018, as part of a Sunday Times investigation into online abuse following controversial comments made by Boris Johnson regarding the niqab and media attention regarding alleged Islamophobia in the Conservative Party, it was reported that a number of Facebook groups supportive of Rees-Mogg and Johnson (some of which included Conservative councillors and officials) were leaving "widespread" Islamophobic and racist comments on Johnson's Facebook page. In response, Rees-Mogg said he was supporting a private member's bill put forward by Labour MP Lucy Powell to regulate social media, and added "people who have these types of views should take no solace in using [Johnson's] comments as an excuse to take this approach". Rees-Mogg defended Johnson against accusations of Islamophobia and criticised the party for initiating disciplinary action against Johnson – in order, Rees-Mogg said, to weaken Johnson politically – calling it a "low-grade abuse of power" as well as a "show trial" and a "witch hunt".

On 15 November 2018, Rees-Mogg implied that he might submit a letter of no confidence in Theresa May over her draft Brexit proposal. Later that day, he submitted such a letter to Sir Graham Brady, the chairman of the 1922 Committee of backbench Conservative MPs and told reporters "What Theresa May says and does no longer match" but added, "this is nothing to do with personal ambition". Following May's announcement that she would call off the House of Commons vote on her Brexit deal due to widespread dislike of the deal, Rees-Mogg made a statement saying: "What has two years of Theresa May doing Brexit amounted to? An undeliverable deal Parliament would roundly reject, if the prime minister has the gumption to allow it to go before the House of Commons. This is not governing, it risks putting Jeremy Corbyn into government by failing to deliver Brexit. We cannot continue like this. The prime minister must either govern or quit." In November 2018, Rees-Mogg suggested the party elect Boris Johnson as its new leader.

Rees-Mogg was described as the leading figure within the unsuccessful effort for a vote of no confidence in Theresa May as party leader by the parliamentary Conservative Party on 12 December. Despite losing the vote, Rees-Mogg continued his calls for May to resign as leader the following day, stating that the Prime Minister had "clearly lost the support of the back benches of the Conservative Party". Rees-Mogg received criticism for his role in this effort from a fellow Conservative MP Tobias Ellwood, who called his actions "destructive", "divisive" and "selfish". On 18 December, Rees-Mogg said: "Under Tory party rules the prime minister won, that is a mandate for the next year. I therefore fully support her, I lost the vote last week." He later voted against the Labour Party's motion of no confidence on 16 January 2019, having stated earlier that day on Politics Live that he would support the Prime Minister.

Rees-Mogg said on 22 February 2019 that he opposed Home Secretary Sajid Javid's decision to revoke the UK citizenship of Shamima Begum, one of the Bethnal Green trio, as she was eligible for Bangladeshi citizenship. On his Friday night show on LBC, he stated that he thought that "there is a fundamental equality in British citizens and if you can't take [his] passport away, then you shouldn't be able to take it away from anybody else" and argued that "Why on earth should Bangladeshis pick up a problem that's essentially our problem. We're trying to put our litter in our neighbour's garden."

=== Johnson government (2019–2022) ===
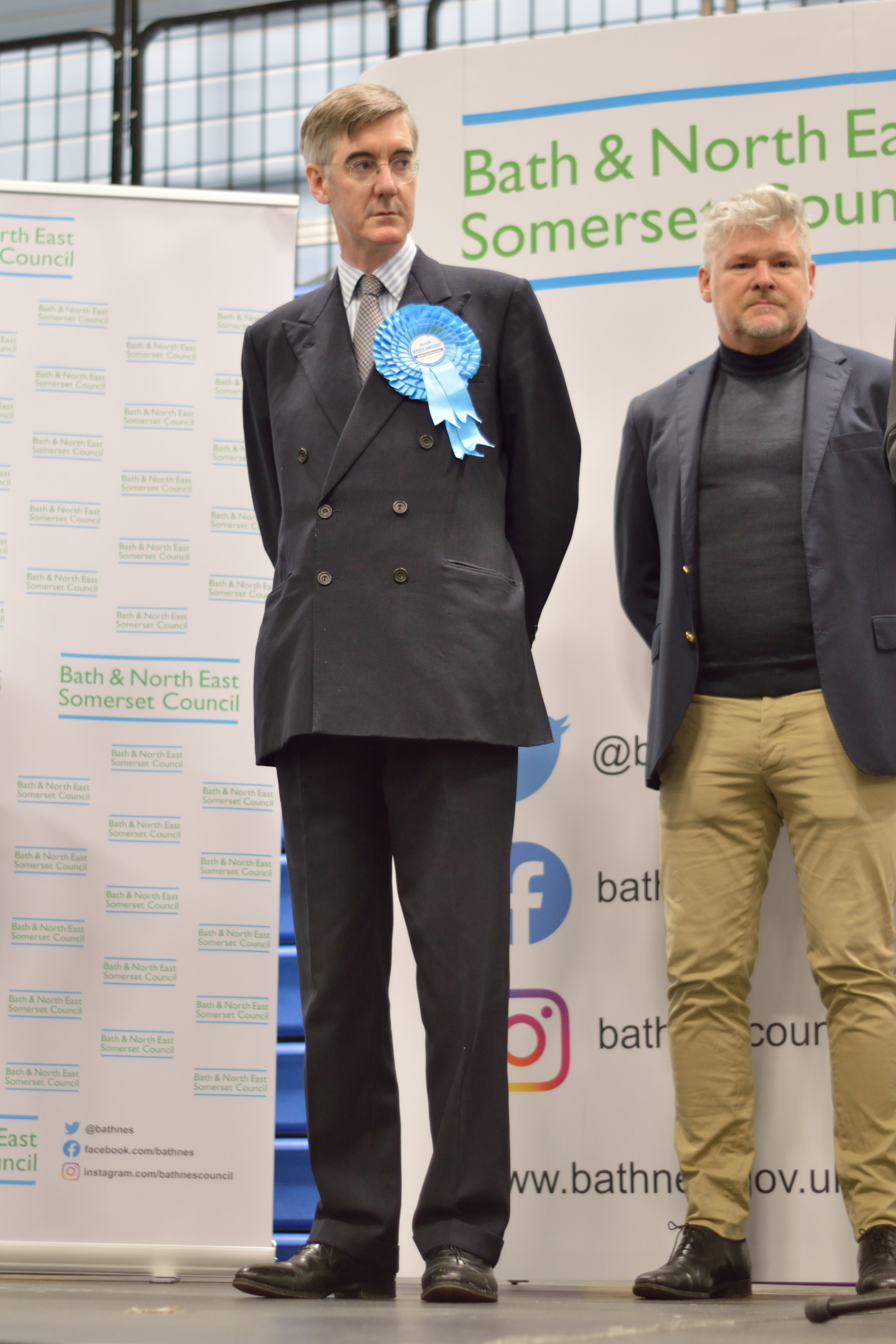
Rees-Mogg at the North East Somerset 2019 general election declaration, alongside independent candidate Shaun Hughes

Rees-Mogg endorsed Boris Johnson to become leader of the Conservative Party following the resignation of Theresa May. Following Johnson's election as leader on 23 July 2019 and appointment as Prime Minister the next day, Rees-Mogg was appointed Leader of the House of Commons, replacing Mel Stride. He also became Lord President of the Council and attended cabinet meetings in the Johnson government. This was the first time that Rees-Mogg either served in a government role or the Cabinet of the United Kingdom.

On 3 September, Rees-Mogg became subject of criticism by fellow MPs after a picture of him reclining on the bench of House of Commons during a debate about the Brexit was published in the media. Rees-Mogg was accused of being contemptuous. Also in September 2019 he apologised after comparing neurologist David Nicholl, who was involved in the government's Operation Yellowhammer report, to discredited anti-vaxxer Andrew Wakefield. Rees-Mogg has supported vaccination against coronavirus and has called anti-vaxxers "nutters".

During the 2019 general election, Rees-Mogg was criticised after an interview with LBC's Nick Ferrari during which he said it would have been "common sense" for residents to flee the Grenfell Tower fire, ignoring fire brigade advice to stay put. Several hours later, Rees-Mogg said he "profoundly apologised" for his comments. Rees-Mogg subsequently made fewer media appearances throughout the rest of the election campaign (in which the Conservatives ultimately won), fuelling speculation in the media that he was under orders from Downing Street to keep a low profile as a result of the Ferrari interview, which was supposedly perceived as damaging to the party. Later in the campaign, in an interview with Boris Johnson, Ferrari asked Johnson: "Where is Moggy? [...] I don't see him anywhere." Johnson responded that Rees-Mogg was campaigning actively around the country.

In 2020 Rees-Mogg accused UNICEF of a political stunt after it announced for the first time in its 70-year history it would be providing food parcels to children in deprived areas of London prior to Christmas. Rees-Mogg said that UNICEF were "playing politics when it is meant to be looking after people in the poorest, the most deprived countries in the world, where people are starving, where there are famines and where there are civil wars." Rees-Mogg was branded "Scrooge" by Labour MP Neil Coyle, whose constituency Bermondsey and Old Southwark is one of the affected areas. In his comments, Rees-Mogg stated the charity was "faffing around in England" and "UNICEF should be ashamed of itself".

In January 2021 Rees-Mogg broke government coronavirus guidance by travelling 15 miles (24 km) from his residence in the Tier 3 area of West Harptree to a church in the Tier 4 area of Glastonbury to attend a Latin Mass. The government's guidance was that people could worship in Tier 4 but were not permitted to travel between tiers. A spokesman for Rees-Mogg said that he "regularly attends the only old rite mass available in the Clifton diocese which meets his religious obligations." In October 2021 Rees-Mogg dismissed criticisms that Conservative MPs in the House of Commons should wear face masks. He said they knew each other and this meant they were acting in line with government COVID guidance.

Rees-Mogg has been criticised for calling Welsh a "foreign language". During a 2021 Commons debate, where Plaid Cymru Westminster leader Liz Saville Roberts wished people "Happy St Patrick's Day" in Welsh and Irish, Rees-Mogg replied that "modest quotation in foreign languages is permissible" but not full speeches. Saville Roberts later pointed out that Welsh is not a foreign language and, historically, had been spoken for centuries before English in Britain.

In October 2021 Rees-Mogg said that the main cause of labour shortages in the UK was the effects of disruptions due to the COVID-19 pandemic rather than Brexit. He said: "The lorry driver shortage is nothing to do with European labour movements. 89% of lorry drivers are UK born and bred in 2021, exactly the same level as in 2016." In January 2022 Rees-Mogg suggested that the forthcoming COVID Inquiry must look at whether COVID regulations had been proportionate or too onerous.

In February 2022 he was appointed Minister of State for Brexit Opportunities and Government Efficiency.

In April 2022 he called for civil servants to return to working in their offices instead of working from home. He expressed concerns about low attendance rate and inefficiency. He was criticised by Dave Penman, general secretary of the FDA trade union for civil servants, for leaving notes at the empty desks of civil servants reading "I look forward to seeing you in the office very soon." Penman said the note was "crass and insulting, and undermined civil service leadership."

In July 2022, following the July 2022 United Kingdom government crisis, Rees-Mogg considered entering the race to be the next leader of the Conservative Party and thus Prime Minister, as a "pro-Boris" candidate. He later supported Liz Truss in the election.

=== Truss government (2022) ===
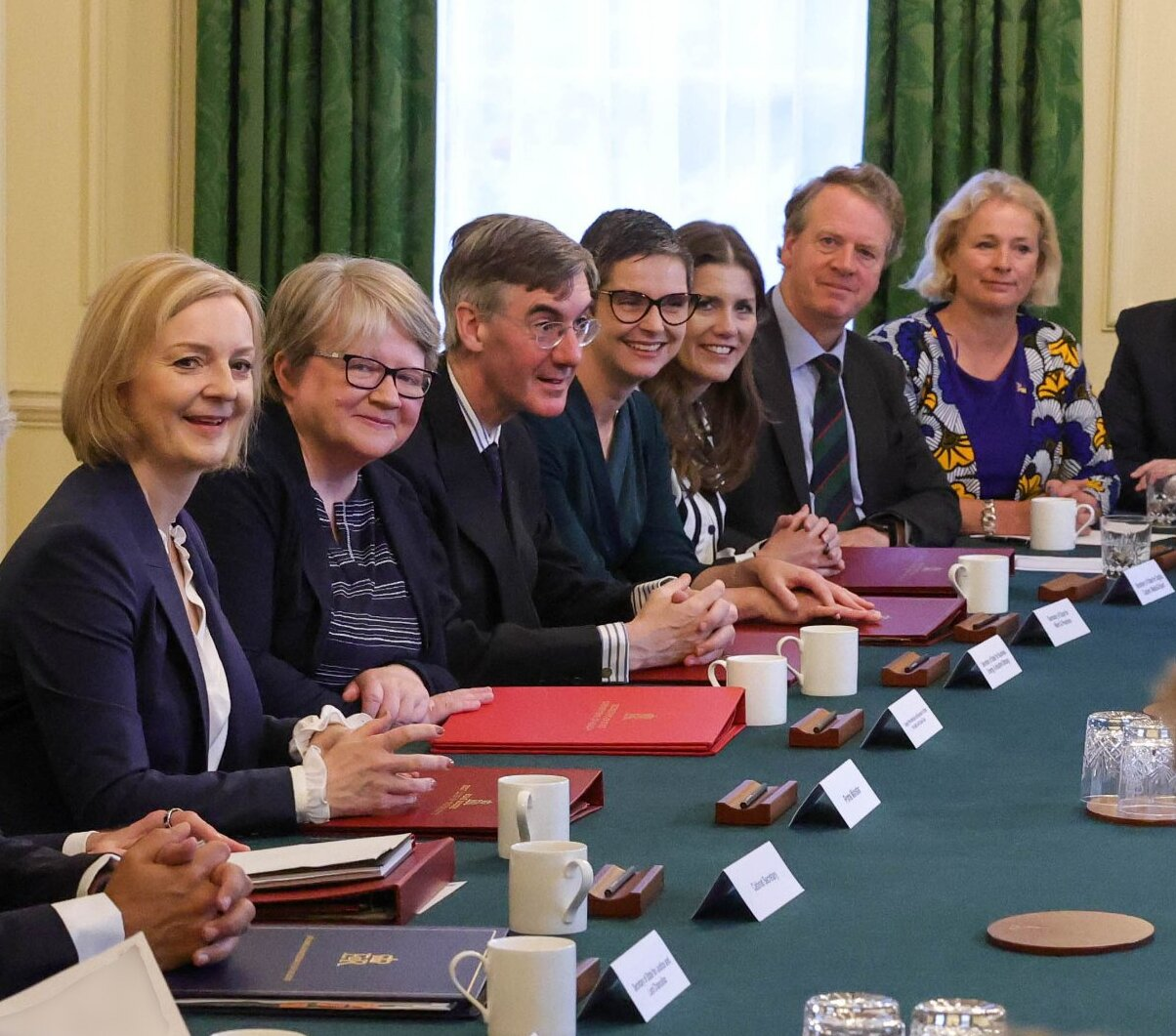
Rees-Mogg sitting as part of Truss's cabinet

Rees-Mogg was appointed Secretary of State for Business, Energy and Industrial Strategy on 6 September 2022 by Prime Minister Liz Truss. Environmental groups expressed concern at his appointment due to his views on climate change and oversight over the UK's net zero targets. His previous office of Minister of State for Brexit Opportunities and Government Efficiency was abolished.

In October 2022, during the Conservative Party Conference, Rees-Mogg said that he would be "delighted" to allow fracking in his back garden.

=== Return to the backbenches and post-parliamentary career ===
On 25 October 2022, Rees-Mogg resigned from the frontbench upon the appointment of Rishi Sunak as prime minister and returned to the backbenches. Whilst a backbencher, on 23 June 2023 Rees-Mogg was one of a number of MPs named in a Special Report by the Privileges Committee. This report was on the co-ordinated campaign of interference (by Rees-Mogg and others) into the Committee investigation into former Prime Minister Boris Johnson intentionally misleading Parliament.

An April 2023 poll, for the Country Land & Business Association, of 1,017 adults living in the 100 most rural constituencies in England, another of August 2023 conducted by The Times, and one for the Trades Union Congress (TUC), of 10,000 adults conducted in September 2023, all suggested that Rees-Mogg was at risk of losing his seat at the 2024 general election.

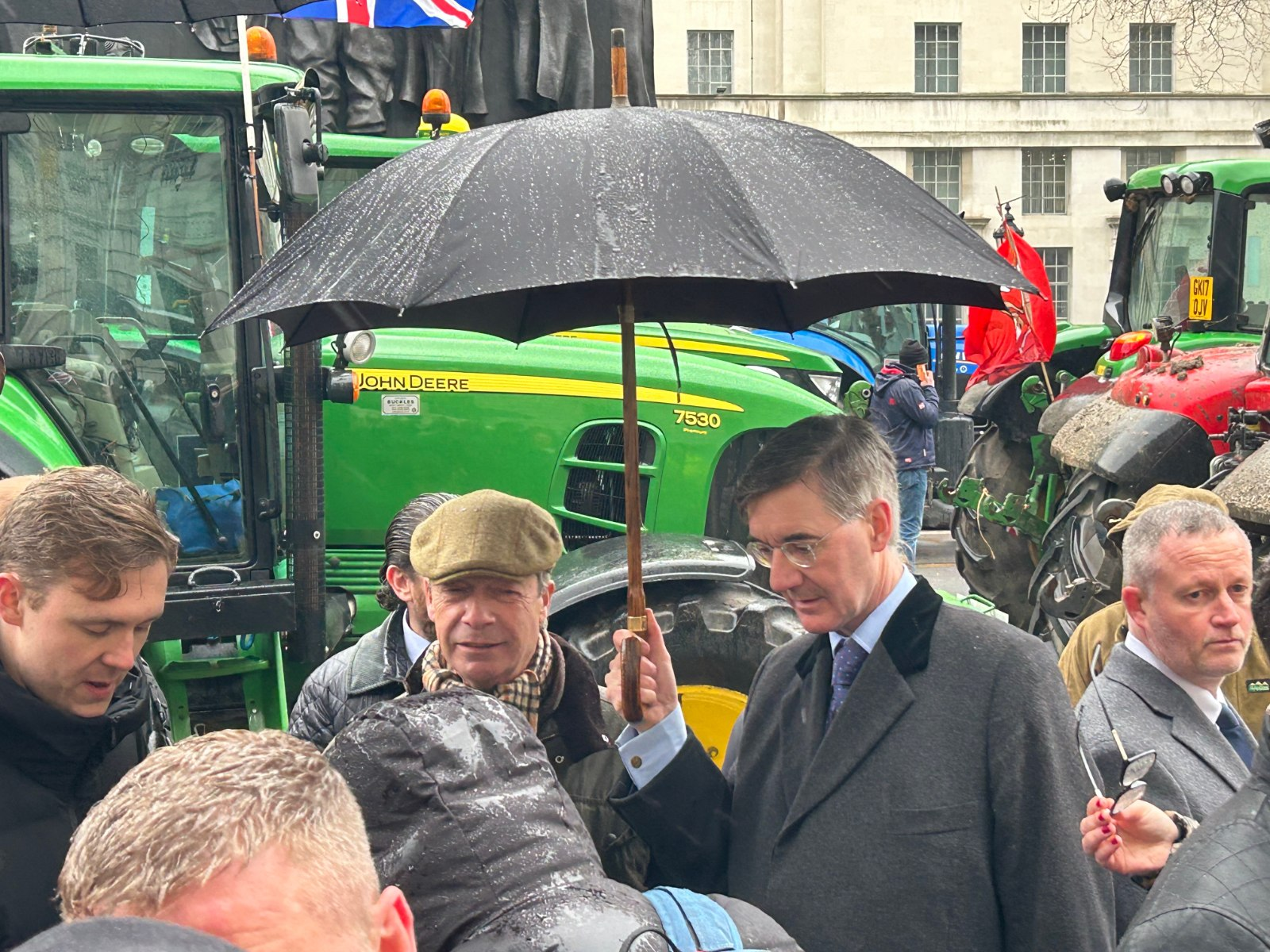
Rees-Mogg with Nigel Farage in February 2025

In April 2024, Rees-Mogg was chased by protestors after giving a speech at Cardiff University. The protesters, some of whom carried Palestinian flags, shouted abuse at Rees-Mogg as he left, prompting university security to escort him off the premises. Although many politicians described the incident as "unacceptable" and an example of there being a culture of intimidation in British politics, Rees-Mogg himself defended the protest, describing it as "legitimate and peaceful...as both the protesters and I were able to give our views without fear or intimidation".

In the 2024 UK general election, Rees-Mogg contested the new constituency of North East Somerset and Hanham, losing to Dan Norris of the Labour Party.

In 2026, Rees-Mogg co-founded a think tank, dedicated to strengthening the partnership between the United Kingdom and the United States and their shared Judeo-Christian civilisation, named 878 Research in the UK. The Trump administration proposes to use Bureau of Democracy, Human Rights, and Labor funding to give a sole source $7 million grant to 878 as part of a package to support conservative-led European groups.

== Political ideology ==
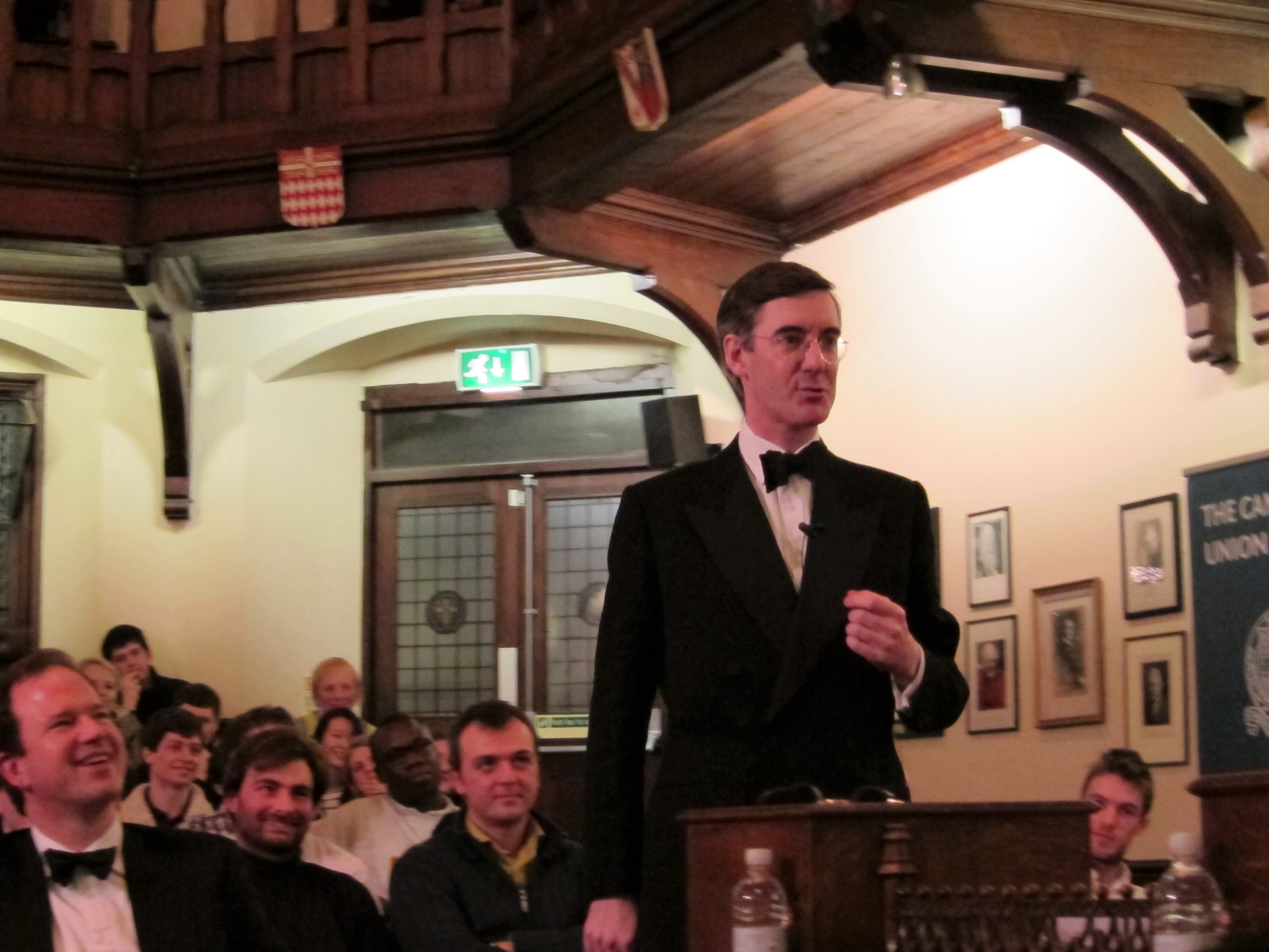
Rees-Mogg debating at Cambridge Union in 2012

Rees-Mogg's political views have been described as High Tory, reactionary, traditionalist, nationalist, socially conservative, and right-wing populist. He has rejected his description as a right-wing populist, stating that he stands for "popular policies, not populist policies". In 2023, Rees-Mogg identified as a national conservative.

Rees-Mogg is a staunch monarchist and a member of the Cornerstone Group.

=== Opposition to membership of the European Union ===
Rees-Mogg's public statements on the European Union and referendum on membership have changed over time. In 2011, referring to the then proposed European Union membership referendum, Rees-Mogg suggested a process with two referendums, saying: "Indeed, we could have two referendums. As it happens, it might make more sense to have the second referendum after the renegotiation is completed." In a May 2012 lecture to the Centre for Policy Studies, in which he laid out his broad policy position on a range of issues, Rees-Mogg referred to the European Union saying: "I am not an advocate of withdrawal from it but instead I want a fundamental renegotiation of terms".

Writing in The Daily Telegraph in May 2013, the Eurosceptic Rees-Mogg asked whether it was time to make a "big open and comprehensive offer" to the UK Independence Party (UKIP). He said collaboration would be straightforward as policies were similar on "many issues" and most Conservatives would prefer Nigel Farage to Nick Clegg as Deputy Prime Minister. His remarks angered his party leadership, while UKIP said it was against any formal arrangements. In January 2019, shortly after Farage left UKIP, Rees-Mogg expressed support for Farage potentially returning to the Conservative Party, stating, "personally I hold Nigel in the highest regard and think he was one of these people who was instrumental in delivering Brexit."

As a vocal critic of the European Union, Rees-Mogg was a leading figure in the campaign for the United Kingdom leaving the European Union, appearing in a number of interviews to debate the topic. Speaking at the Oxford Union, he described the EU as a threat to British democracy and to the sovereignty of parliament citing various countries' rejection of the European Constitution which was later implemented via the Treaty of Lisbon. He later credited the DUP for having "saved" Brexit by torpedoing an agreement between the government and the EU. After meeting with a representative of the Alternative for Germany (AfD) party, he criticised the party for being insufficiently eurosceptic, stating that "German euroscepticism is milk to British euroscepticism's brandy."

In April 2019 Rees-Mogg was criticised online after he tweeted a video of a speech made by Alice Weidel, the co-leader of Alternative for Germany (AfD) party. David Lammy, the Labour MP for Tottenham, said Rees-Mogg was "promoting Germany's overtly racist party, AfD". Speaking later, Rees-Mogg said: "I'm not supporting the AfD. But this is a speech in the Bundestag of real importance because it shows a German view of Brexit." He replied to Lammy in a statement on LBC radio saying: "Once again, Mr Lammy's reputation for under-statement is reinforced."

UCL's modern Jewish history professor Michael Berkowitz accused Rees-Mogg of trafficking in antisemitic tropes when Rees-Mogg castigated his opponents in a Commons debate on 'no-deal' Brexit (specifically Oliver Letwin and John Bercow – both of whom are Jewish) as "Illuminati who are taking the powers to themselves." In October 2019, Rees-Mogg faced similar criticism from David Lammy when he suggested that George Soros was allegedly the "funder-in-chief" of the Remain campaign.

=== Education ===
Rees-Mogg is a proponent of academy-based education, reasoning that it gives schools more freedom from local education authorities to make decisions and cuts down on bureaucracy. While defending the list of Conservative candidates for the 2005 election, he said that it would be foolish to disbar candidates who attended Oxford and Cambridge Universities from selection. He stated: "We don't want to make it harder for intellectually able people to be Tory party candidates", saying that the country would not be best run by "potted plants".

In February 2018, police launched an investigation after Rees-Mogg was caught in the middle of an altercation at a university campus when left wing protesters disrupted a student event in Bristol. The non-platforming and interference received cross party condemnation with Jo Swinson, then Leader of the Liberal Democrats, tweeting that she was "deeply worried by the violence" and Labour MP Angela Rayner also tweeted saying that she "utterly condemned the behaviour" of those who tried to attack Rees-Mogg and that she found the tactics "intimidating".

=== Environment and climate change ===
Rees-Mogg has set out his views on environment and climate change in a number of public documents, articles and interviews. He is sceptical of the need to mitigate climate change, instead arguing for adaptation, and believes carbon neutrality targets increase energy prices.

In 2012, Rees-Mogg questioned the scientific consensus on climate change, claiming that the effect of carbon dioxide emissions on the climate "remains much debated". According to Fiona Harvey, Rees-Mogg has "many times voiced climate denialism – even to the extent of misrepresenting climate science", highlighting several times he had criticised the Intergovernmental Panel on Climate Change. Rees-Mogg was one of 100 MPs who wrote to David Cameron successfully pressurising the government to withdraw subsidies and change planning rules for onshore wind. Rees-Mogg is an investor in oil and coal mining through Somerset Capital Management, which he benefits from financially.

Rees-Mogg blamed "climate alarmism" for rising energy prices in 2013, advocating the continued use of fossil fuels.

Rees-Mogg suggested in 2017 that environmental regulations could be relaxed, stating: "We could say, if it's good enough in India, it's good enough for here. There's nothing to stop that. We could take it a very long way ... I accept that we're not going to allow dangerous toys to come in from China, we don't want to see those kind of risks. But there's a very long way you can go."

In October 2021, Rees-Mogg said that there was enough time for the UK to do its part to tackle climate change. He said the UK had 30 years to reach its target of net zero carbon emissions. He stated that parts used for solar energy had fallen in price over the last 20 years, making renewable energy more affordable. In April 2022, Rees-Mogg stated that "We need to be thinking about exploiting every last cubic inch of gas from the North Sea. We are not going for net zero tomorrow – 2050 is a long way off".

=== Economic and labour policy ===
While Rees-Mogg largely espouses free market economic views, he endorses a role for state intervention, having been influenced by both Robert Peel, an economic liberal, and Benjamin Disraeli, a protectionist. He believes that improving people's lives requires "some use of the powers that the government has".

In 2013, Rees-Mogg expressed support for zero-hour contracts, arguing that they benefit employees, including students, by providing flexibility and could provide a route into more permanent employment. He rejected criticism by Vince Cable and others that they were exploitative as "the standard response of the left". In September 2017, Rees-Mogg suggested that food banks fulfil a vital function, and proceeded to argue that "to have charitable support given by people voluntarily to support their fellow citizens I think is rather uplifting and shows what a good, compassionate country we are", a statement for which he won that year's Foot in Mouth Award. He went on to argue that "the real reason for the rise in numbers is that people know that they are there and Labour deliberately didn't tell them." During the same interview, Rees-Mogg conceded that people have "found life tough" but suggested the best way out of poverty was through employment.

In 2022, Rees-Mogg suggested that corporations should no longer have to report on the gender pay gap and the speed with which they pay their suppliers.

=== Foreign relations ===
Rees-Mogg has taken a mixed approach to British involvement in the Syrian civil war, denouncing a proposal to arm the Syrian rebels, but subsequently voting in favour of a failed proposal for British military action against the Bashar al-Assad regime in 2013. In October 2015, he argued that "The consequences of the efforts to undermine Assad have been the rise of terrorism and the mass movement of people."

He voted in favour of British military action against the Islamic State in Iraq in 2014 and in Syria in 2015.

He has described foreign aid as a "really wasteful approach to government spending", and in 2018 supported a campaign by the Daily Express to reduce Britain's foreign aid budget.

=== Immigration ===
Rees-Mogg has previously voted for a stricter asylum system and a more controlled immigration policy in order to reduce net migration. According to Nigel Farage, Rees-Mogg believes a poster featuring the words "breaking point" overlaid on an image of columns of Syrian refugees entering Europe "won the referendum" for the Leave campaign. Rees-Mogg favours the end of free movement of people to the United Kingdom. He wants non-British EU citizens residing in the UK to be protected with "broadly the same rights as British citizens – no better or worse", and not have rights given to them retrospectively retracted.

In May 2018, Rees-Mogg criticised May's target of reducing immigration numbers to 100,000 per year as too low, describing it as "a number that was plucked out of the air" and as "pulling up the drawbridge", and said he was "very sympathetic" to removing student visas from official immigration numbers.

=== Social issues ===
Regarding same-sex marriage, Rees-Mogg has stated that he is opposed to it and "not proud" of it being legal, and that it has alienated traditional supporters of the Conservative Party. In 2013, Rees-Mogg said that on the issue of same-sex marriage, he took his "whip from the hierarchy of the Roman Catholic Church rather than the [Conservative] Whip's Office". He later elaborated that in his view "marriage is a sacrament and the decision of what is a sacrament lies with the Church, not with Parliament."

Rees-Mogg has said that he does not believe Britain's laws on same-sex marriage or abortion will change.

Rees-Mogg is against abortion in all circumstances, stating: "life begins at the point of conception." He has described abortion as "a cult of death" and a "modern tragedy", adding "with same-sex marriage, that is something that people are doing for themselves. With abortion, that is what people are doing to the unborn child". In September 2017, he expressed "a great sadness" on hearing about how online retailers had reduced pricing of emergency contraception. In October 2017, it was reported that Somerset Capital Management, of which Rees-Mogg was a partner, had invested £5m in Kalbe Farma, a company that produces and markets misoprostol pills designed to treat stomach ulcers but widely used in illegal abortions in Indonesia. Rees-Mogg defended the investment by arguing that the company in question "obeys Indonesian law so it's a legitimate investment and there's no hypocrisy. The law in Indonesia would satisfy the Vatican". Several days later, it was reported that the same company also held shares in FDC, a company that sold drugs used as part of legal abortions in India. Somerset Capital Management subsequently sold the shares it had held in FDC. Rees-Mogg said: "I am glad to say it's a stock that we no longer hold. I would not try to defend investing in companies that did things I believe are morally wrong".

Rees-Mogg is opposed to capital punishment, and favours due process for British jihadists operating abroad.

== Media ==
Rees-Mogg appeared on The 11 O'Clock Show in 1999, where he was interviewed by Ali G, who called him "Lord Rees-Mogg" and attempted to talk about social class.

In October 2017 Rees-Mogg presented talk radio station LBC's morning show for a day, where he discussed Brexit, foreign policy and the T-charge with callers, including Liberal Democrat leader Vince Cable. Rees-Mogg was praised for his sense of charm and humour. He returned to present a Sunday show on LBC in February 2018.

Rees-Mogg has his own dedicated podcast known as 'The MoggCast', which, in association with ConservativeHome, features him discussing a wide array of current events on a fortnightly basis.

On 15 July 2017, he joined Twitter, writing in Latin: Tempora mutantur, et nos mutamur in illis. ("The times change, and we change with them"). He also uses Instagram and other social media.

In January 2023 Rees-Mogg was announced to be joining GB News to present his own show. In the 9 May episode of State of the Nation, Rees-Mogg covered a breaking news story about a civil trial verdict involving Donald Trump. The media regulator Ofcom received 40 complaints. In July 2023 Ofcom announced that they were investigating whether the episode broke their rules on preventing politicians from acting as newsreaders.

On 2 December 2024, the reality TV show Meet the Rees-Moggs premiered on the discovery+ channel. The season consists of five 40-45 minute-long episodes. The show received mixed reviews, with Nick Hilton of The Independent deeming it "toothless, vapid, and not really fair on the kids", while The Guardian's Joel Goldby called it "impeccable reality TV". In 2025, the show was not given a second series.

== Public image ==
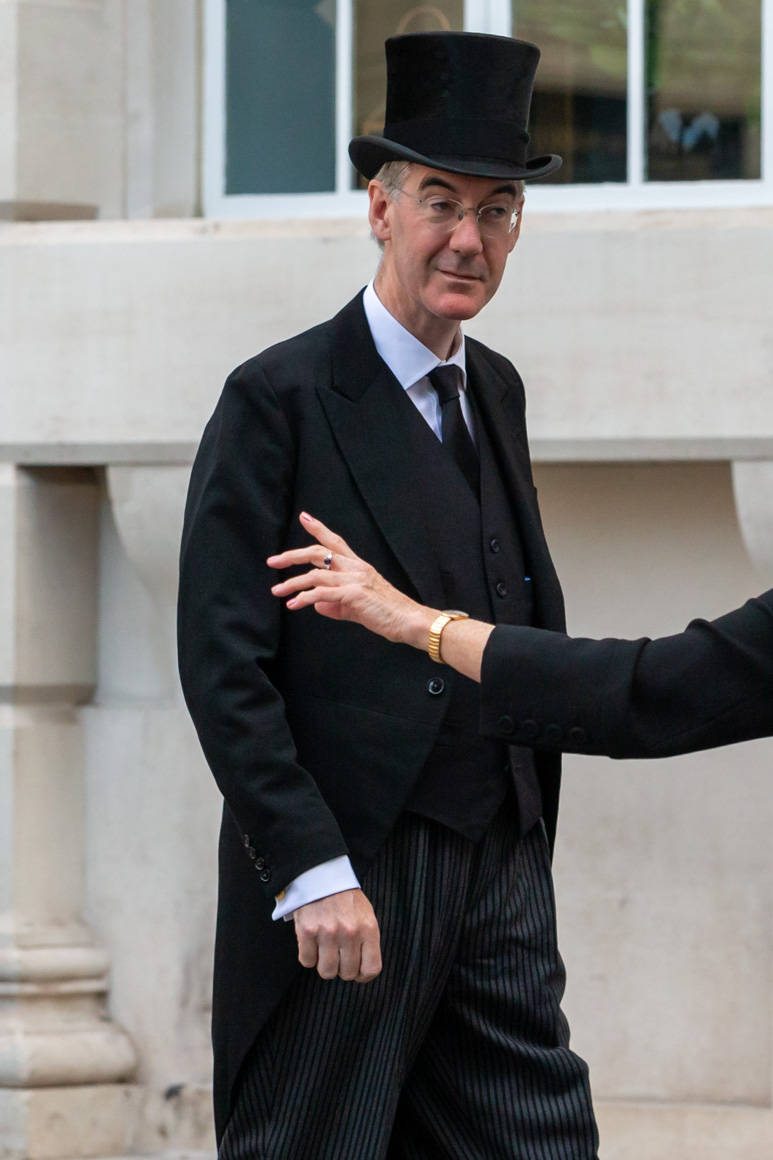
Rees-Mogg in September 2022

Rees-Mogg has cultivated a public image as a quintessentially English gentleman, whose anachronistic upper-class mannerisms and consciously traditionalist attitudes have led to him being dubbed the "Honourable Member for the 18th century".

According to an article in the Evening Standard in 2018, Rees-Mogg has generated controversy in the past through some of his "more extreme views". In 2017 the commentator Suzanne Moore compared Rees-Mogg to Boris Johnson, Nigel Farage, and Donald Trump, suggesting that like them "he embodies the three things that many people require of modern politicians: a veneer of authenticity; an ability to cut through perceived liberal wisdom; and enormous privilege that is flaunted, rather than hidden." Moore was of the view that he uses his "religious faith" in an attempt to "excuse his appalling bigotry". Moore went on to describe him as "a thoroughly modern bigot" and to describe his political views as "verg[ing] on fascistic ... dressed up in tweed with a knowledge of the classics".

Rees-Mogg has at various times both described himself as a "man of the people" and rejected that description, saying: "The 'man of the people' act is the height of condescension."

== Personal life ==
Rees-Mogg is the uncle of Olympic athlete Lawrence Clarke and former Conservative MP Theo Clarke.

In 2006 Rees-Mogg became engaged to Helena Anne Beatrix Wentworth Fitzwilliam de Chair, a writer for a trade magazine and the only child of Somerset de Chair and his fourth wife Lady Juliet Tadgell. Rees-Mogg had first met de Chair, a close friend of his sister, when they were children, and they began dating the year before their engagement, after Rees-Mogg had gained the blessing of her mother. The couple were married at Canterbury Cathedral, Kent, in 2007, in a ceremony at which the Novus Ordo was celebrated in Latin. They have six children.

In 2010 the couple purchased Gournay Court, a Grade II* listed building in West Harptree. The house served as a Red Cross hospital during the First World War. Rees-Mogg's great aunt served as a volunteer nurse and the resident matron there.

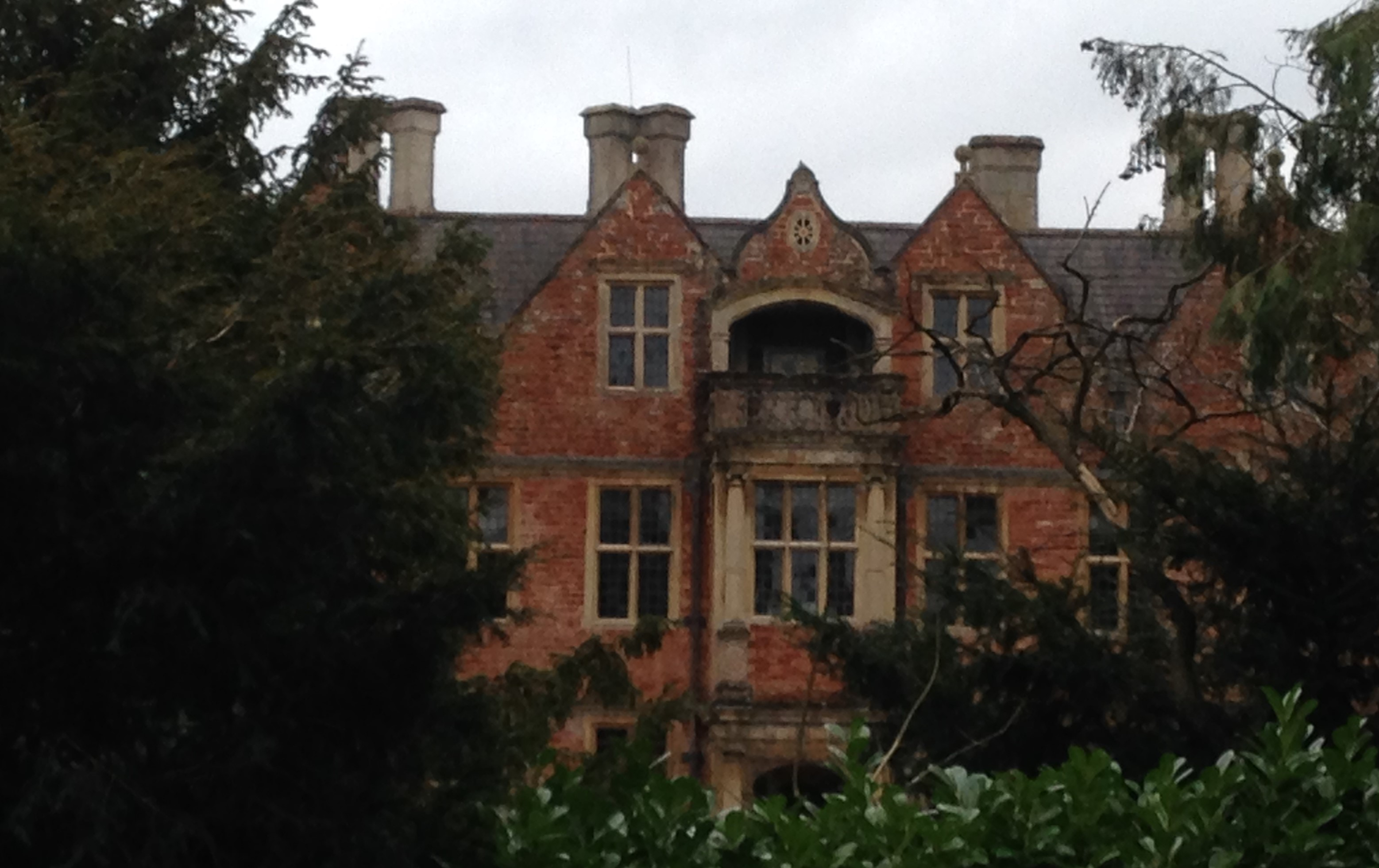
Since 2010, Rees-Mogg has lived at Gournay Court.

Rees-Mogg is a traditionalist Catholic. He attends Traditional Latin Mass.

In July 2017 Rees-Mogg said: "I've made no pretence to be a modern man at all, ever" and commented that he had never changed a nappy, stating: "I don't think nanny would approve because I'm sure she'd think I wouldn't do it properly." In September 2017, Labour MP Harriet Harman said that "Men who don't change nappies are deadbeat dads – and that includes Jacob Rees-Mogg".

As a member of the All-Party Parliamentary Group for Historic Vehicles, Rees-Mogg has an interest in historic cars. Aged 23, he purchased a 1968 T-Series Bentley previously owned by cricketer Gubby Allen. In 2005, Rees-Mogg added a 1936 3.5 Litre Bentley to his collection, and used a Lexus for everyday use. Rees-Mogg is a cricket enthusiast, and has supported Somerset County Cricket Club since his youth.

In May 2018, he purchased a £5 million property on Cowley Street, behind Westminster Abbey.

== Titles, styles, and arms ==
When his father was appointed a life peer in 1988, he became entitled to the style of The Honourable as the son of a baron. Upon appointment to the Privy Council on 25 July 2019 at Buckingham Palace he received the style of The Right Honourable for life. He was made a Knight Bachelor in the 2022 Prime Minister's Resignation Honours.

Coat of arms of Jacob Rees-Mogg
Crest 1st, between two spearheads erect sable a cock proper (Mogg); 2nd, a swan argent wings elevated or, holding in the beak a water-lily slipped proper (Rees). Escutcheon Quarterly: 1st and 4th, argent on a fesse pean between six ermine spots, the two exterior in chief and the centre spot in base, surmounted by a crescent gules, a cock or (Mogg); 2nd and 3rd, gules a chevron engrailed erminois between three swans argent, wings elevated, or (Rees); over all a Crescent for difference. Motto Cura Pii Diis Sunt (The pious are an object of concern for the gods)

== Awards ==
- Foot in Mouth Award

== Writings ==
- Freedom, Responsibility and the State: Curbing Over-Mighty Government. Politeia. 2012. ISBN 978-0-9571872-2-1.
- Harriman's New Book of Investing Rules: The do's and don'ts of the world's best investors. Harriman House. 2017. ISBN 978-0-85719-684-2.
- Goodbye, Europe: Writers and Artists Say Farewell. Orion Publishing Group. 2017. ISBN 978-1-4091-7759-3.
- The Victorians. W. H. Allen. 2019. ISBN 978-0-7535-4852-3.

== See also ==
- Moggmentum, a fan movement for Jacob Rees-Mogg.

== Notes ==
Parliament of the United Kingdom
New constituency	Member of Parliament for North East Somerset; 2010–2024	Succeeded by Constituency abolished
Political offices
Preceded by Mel Stride	Leader of the House of Commons; 2019–2022	Succeeded by Mark Spencer
Preceded by Mel Stride	Lord President of the Council; 2019–2022	Succeeded by Mark Spencer
Preceded by The Lord Agnew of Oulton	Minister of State for Brexit Opportunities and Government Efficiency; 2022	Succeeded by Vacant
Preceded by Kwasi Kwarteng	Secretary of State for Business, Energy and Industrial Strategy; 2022	Succeeded by Grant Shapps
Other offices
Preceded by Suella Fernandes	Chair of the European Research Group; 2018–2019	Succeeded by Steve Baker
