= Milifandom =

Online campaign celebrating Ed Miliband, former leader of the UK Labour Party

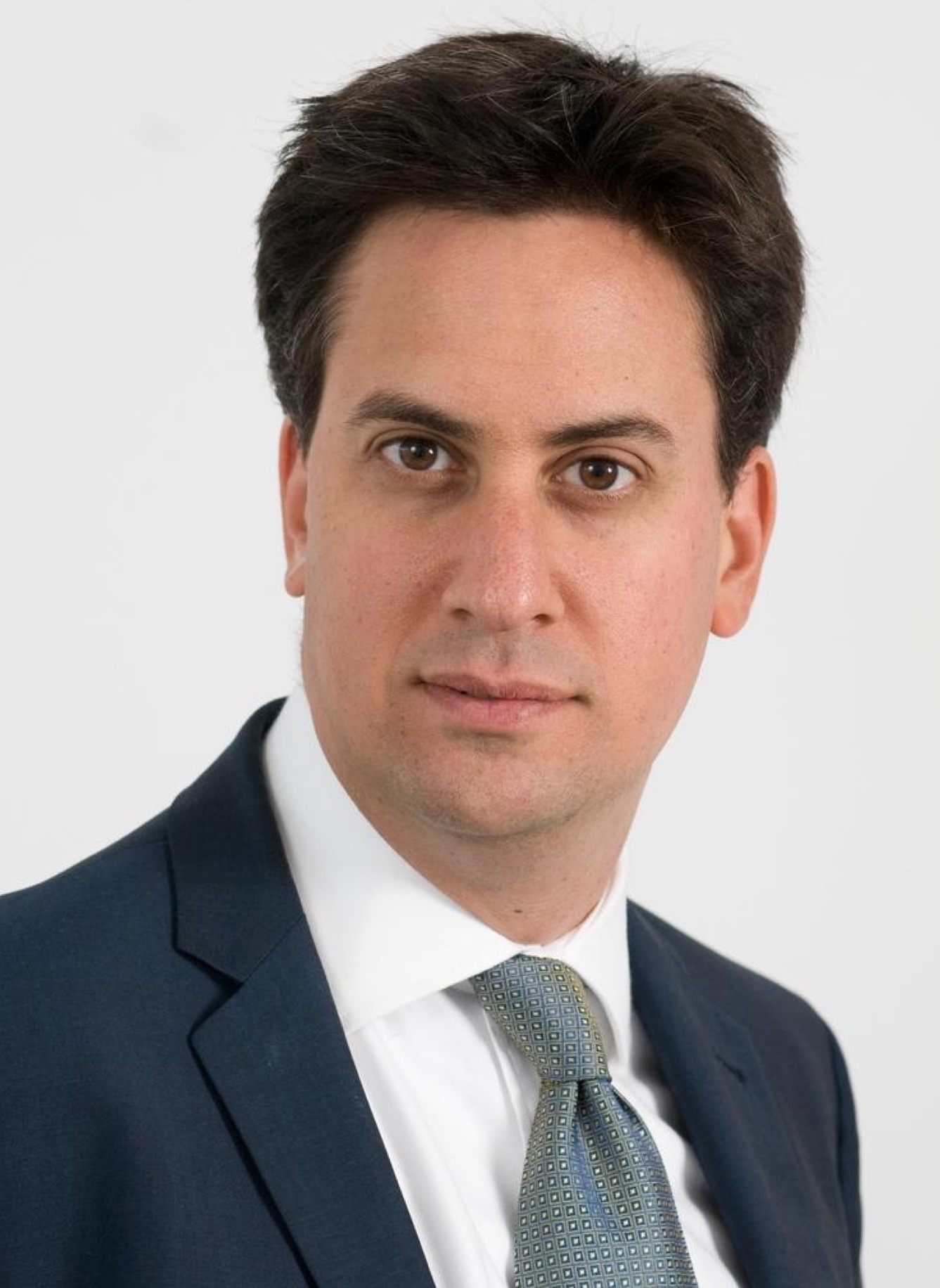
Ed Miliband as Energy Secretary in the Government of Gordon Brown

#Milifandom was an online campaign celebrating Ed Miliband, then-Leader of the Labour Party in the UK. The campaign was thought to have been started on Twitter by a seventeen-year-old student, Abby Tomlinson, with the aim of creating an online fandom for the leader. Supporters then used the Milifandom hashtag to declare their admiration for Miliband. The campaign has been viewed as an example of youth engagement in politics, against negative portrayals of Miliband in the media. As well as the disconnect between social media voting intentions and real world voting intentions, as David Cameron would go on to increase his parliamentary majority.

== History ==
The Milifandom hashtag began trending on Twitter in late-April 2015, as the result of a Twitter campaign led by a seventeen-year-old sixth-form student from St Helens, Merseyside; then known as just "Abby". Tomlinson described the campaign as "a movement against the distorted media portrayal of Ed," and said that she "started the #millifandom campaign to show how powerful young people are." Tomlinson gained 12,000 followers on Twitter as a result.

The hashtag has been used both to express affection for Miliband, and show support for Labour policies. Members of the Milifandom, known as 'Milifans,' began referring to Miliband as 'Milibae' and tweeting photos of him with rings of flowers photoshopped onto his head. Photo edits in which Miliband's face was superimposed onto pictures of celebrities were spread on the hashtag, many originating from an account called "cooledmiliband." Users of the hashtag have also spread the Labour Party's manifesto and policies.

Tomlinson received media attention when she accused Rupert Murdoch and The Sun of bullying her, after the newspaper's reporters tracked down her home address, and that of her grandmother. Barrister John Cooper launched a pro-bono inquiry into these actions. A spokesman for The Sun stated the addresses were gained through legal means and that the newspaper had not violated its Editors' Code. Michael Koziol of the Sydney Morning Herald claimed that Tomlinson's actions have "elevated [her] to hero status among Labour supporters and Murdoch-detractors in Britain."

Following the 2015 General Election, Tomlinson had more than 27,000 followers on Twitter. Miliband resigned as leader of the Labour Party on 8 May, following the defeat of Labour in the election. In his resignation speech he thanked his supporters by saying "Thank you for the selfies, thank you for the support, and thank you for the most unlikely cult of the 21st century, Milifandom". Tomlinson has written for The Guardian, the Daily Mirror, and HuffPost on issues relating to the Labour Party and British politics in general.

== Responses ==
Milifandom has been compared in the press to teenage fandoms surrounding popular musicians such as Justin Bieber and One Direction. Writing for The Daily Telegraph Radhika Sanghani argued that, while Milifandom may have started as an ironic joke for some Twitter users, it had developed into a genuine display of affection for Miliband that distinguished itself from other fandoms through its support for his "80-page manifesto." Rhiannon Lucy Cosslett of The Guardian said that Milifandom represented the ""meme-ification" of politics," and its members were making the statement that "I am progressive and I follow politics with a keen sense of irony. And I fancy Ed Miliband."

Miliband has responded positively to the fandom, sending thanks to Tomlinson over Twitter and calling her on the phone. He stated on the Jeremy Vine Show that "It's very nice of those people who have joined this thing to be being nice about me, but I think they're making a serious point about young people in our politics as well." Miliband's wife Justine Thornton is reported to have "rolled her eyes" upon being informed of the fandom's existence. Miliband stated that "she thinks it might be a case of mistaken identity."

#Cameronettes, a Conservative response to the Milifandom, was suggested by 21-year-old Twitter user and University of Exeter student, Charlie Evans. A Cameronettes Twitter account was created that was said to be run by a 13-year-old girl. The hashtag has been reported by the BBC to be "less successful" than the Milifandom. In the 2017 General Election, the Mayllennials came into existence as a fandom for British Prime Minister Theresa May, who was seeking to be re-elected. The fandom was said to be inspired from the Milifandom.

== See also ==
- #KHive
- #Moggmentum
