= Moggmentum =

Online right-wing grassroots campaign

Logo used by the Moggmentum campaign

Moggmentum is an online right-wing campaign and grassroots movement supporting Jacob Rees-Mogg, in a similar fashion to the 2015 phenomena of Milifandom and Momentum. The movement includes pressure for Rees-Mogg to become the Leader of the Conservative Party in the United Kingdom. Comparisons between Moggmentum and the Tea Party movement in the United States have been made with regard to their supporting "rightwing ideas, grassroots activism and shaking up the conservative establishment".

== History ==
In May 2017, during the general election campaign, Rees-Mogg posted a picture on Instagram of himself and his son standing outside a tattoo parlour in his constituency that was displaying a "Vote Labour" poster alongside a poster reading "Keep sane and don't vote Tory"; his picture was captioned: "We shall have to take our business elsewhere". As a result, the hashtag Moggmentum began to trend on Twitter.

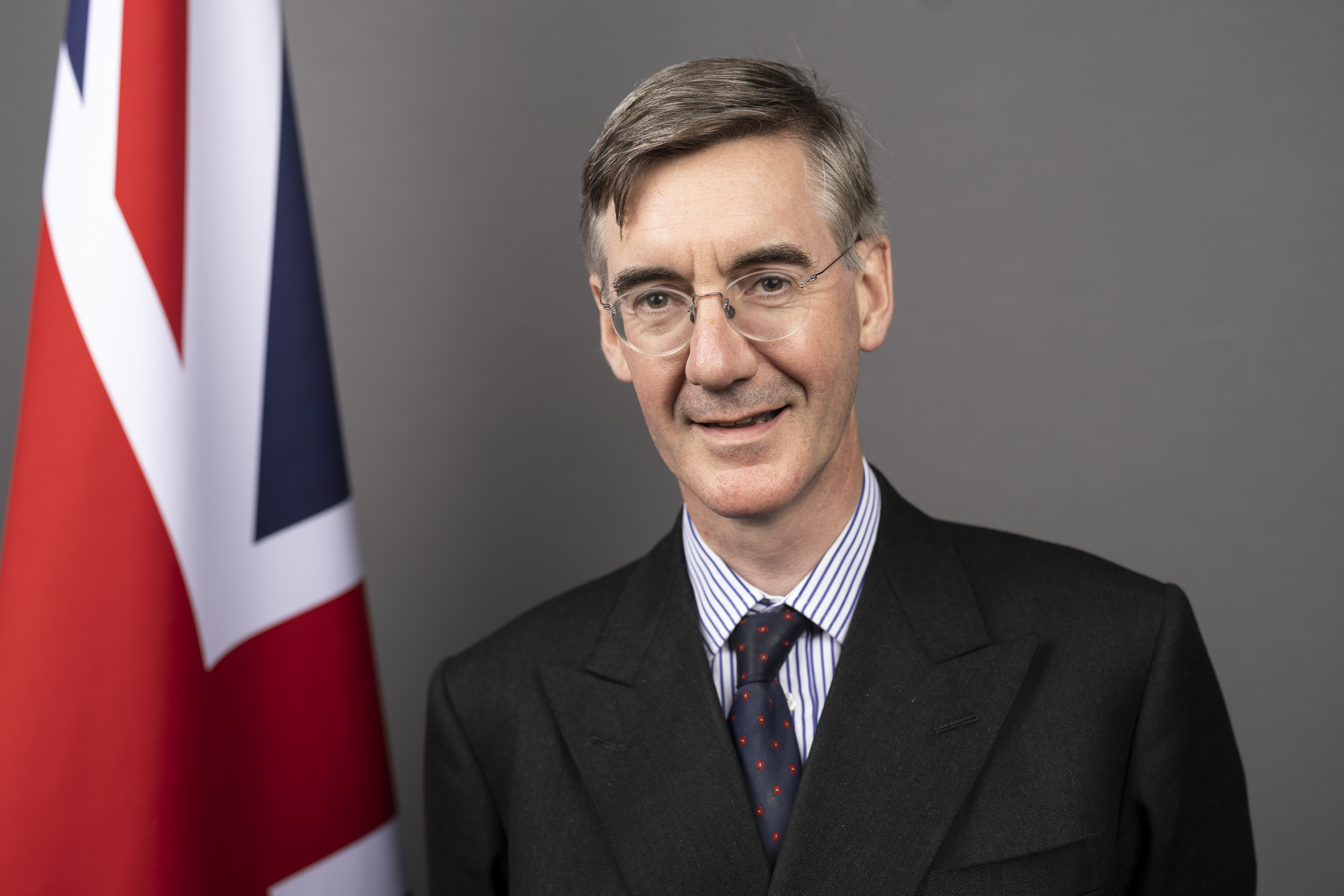
Rees-Mogg, official portrait

The hashtag Moggmentum began to trend again in June 2017, as a result of Rees-Mogg interrupting Jeremy Corbyn during the debate on the Queen's Speech, an act that was criticised by Speaker of the House of Commons John Bercow. Following the speech, a series of memes were created with Rees-Mogg as the subject. A petition was started to make Rees-Mogg Prime Minister; it gained £7,000 in support funding and 13,000 signatures over the next two days.

On 7 July 2017, Rees-Mogg gained significant publicity as the potential next Conservative Party leader when major news outlets began releasing articles about the subject. According to Pollstation, at the time, Rees-Mogg had an opinion polling of 60% to take over as Conservative Party leader, with Boris Johnson following with 12% of the votes. On the same day, betting odds were "slashed" from 50/1 to 16/1 on Oddschecker; this was directly attributed to the campaign.

In late July and early August 2017, Moggmentum was featured in a number of foreign media, including prominent publications such as: Belgian De Redactie, American The National Interest and Polish Wprost. It was reported in early August that Ross Atkinson, a Rees-Mogg supporter, had been tattooed with the Moggmentum logo.

Some of these Facebook groups included "Tory councillors, officials and agents". In March 2019, 14 Conservative Party members were expelled after they were found to have posted Islamophobic comments in a pro-Mogg Facebook group.

== Responses ==
The BBC released a trending subject article on the movement on 3 July 2017, and two days later a two-minute video was added to the BBC website summarising the phenomenon.

On 12 and 17 July, the New Statesman and The New European published articles calling the movement a cult. The latter published another piece on 19 August, penned by Bonnie Greer, who called Rees-Mogg a "false memory".

In 2018, as part of a Sunday Times investigation into online abuse following comments made by Boris Johnson regarding the niqab and media controversy regarding alleged Conservative Islamophobia, it was reported that a number of Facebook groups supportive of Rees-Mogg and Johnson were leaving "widespread" Islamophobic and racist comments on Johnson's Facebook page, including: support for Enoch Powell and his Rivers of Blood speech, incitement to violence and murder against Muslims, Islamophobic attacks on London mayor Sadiq Khan and support for far-right activist Tommy Robinson. In response, Rees-Mogg said he was supporting a private member's bill put forward by Labour MP Lucy Powell to regulate social media, and added "people who have these types of views should take no solace in using [Johnson's] comments as an excuse to take this approach".

== See also ==
- Activate (organisation)
- Milifandom
- Corbynmania
