= The Victorians (Rees-Mogg book) =

2019 biographical work by Jacob Rees-Mogg

- Author: Jacob Rees-Mogg
- Language: English
- Subject: Victorian era
- Genre: Biography
- Publisher: W. H. Allen & Co.
- Publication date: 23 May 2019
- Publication place: United Kingdom
- Pages: 464
- ISBN: 978-0753548523
- Dewey Decimal: 941.081

The Victorians: Twelve Titans who Forged Britain is a 2019 biographical work by the Conservative politician Jacob Rees-Mogg, a backbencher at the time, in which he discusses twelve influential British figures of the Victorian period.

The book covers Prince Albert, Disraeli, Palmerston, Robert Peel, William Gladstone, Sir Charles James Napier, General Gordon, W. G. Grace, William Sleeman, Albert Dicey, Augustus Pugin, and Queen Victoria.

== Reception ==
The book was subject to a largely negative critical reception. Columnist A. N. Wilson called it "staggeringly silly" and "morally repellent", while historian Richard J. Evans described it as "plodding, laborious, humourless and barely readable".

It has been criticised for including only one woman, for failure to use primary sources, and on literary grounds. In her review, scholar of the Victorian period Kathryn Hughes wrote, "At least we know The Victorians isn't ghost written, since no self-respecting freelancer would dare ask for payment for such rotten prose".

Dominic Sandbrook, reviewing the book for The Sunday Times, described it as "bad, boring and mind‑bogglingly banal".

However, the historian Andrew Roberts described the book as "a full-throated, clear-sighted, well-researched and extremely well-written exposition of the Victorians and their values".
