= Activate =

Activate may refer to:

== Arts and entertainment ==
- Activate (album), by Back Door
- Activated (album), by Tee Grizzley
- "Activate", a 2006 song by Stellar Kart from We Can't Stand Sitting Down
- "Activate", a 2023 track and EP by Slam
- "Activated", a 2016 song by Cher Lloyd
- "Activated", a 1989 song by Gerald Alston

== Organisations ==
- Activate (organisation), a British political organisation
- Activate Learning, an English education group
- Honduras Activate, a health organisation

== See also ==
- Activation
- Activator (disambiguation)
- Reactivate, trance music compilation album series
