= Chairman's Choice =

Chairman's Choice is a practice where a company head mandates that his/her company sponsors an event/celebrity etc. for personal gain, or for illogical or non-existent commercial reasons. The practice is less prevalent in developed countries but occurs more often in emerging markets.

Sponsorship is not to be confused with charity donations which are not designed to create a commercial return for a company.
