= Jihadi tourism =

Tourism for terrorist training

Jihadi tourism, also referred to as jihad tourism or jihadist tourism, is a term sometimes used to describe travel to foreign destinations with the object of scouting for terrorist training. US diplomatic cables leaked in 2010 have raised concerns about this form of travel. Within intelligence circles, the term is also sometimes applied dismissively to travellers who are assumed to be seeking contact with extremist groups mainly out of curiosity.

== History ==
In previous times, several people from Britain and France along with Middle East travelled to join Soviet–Afghan War.

== Tourism for terrorist training or connections ==
British police characterized a visit to Pakistan by homegrown terrorists, Mohammad Sidique Khan and Shehzad Tanweer, as jihadi tourism, and doubted that they were actual terrorists. Sidique Khan and Tanweer were reported to have met Abd al-Hadi al-Iraqi, one of al-Qaeda’s most experienced commanders, in November 2004, when he tasked them to plan an attack in England. Khan and Tanweer were later two of the four suicide bombers in the 7 July 2005 London bombings.

Neoconservative author Laurent Murawiec has alleged that wealthy young men from Saudi Arabia have travelled to Afghanistan and Pakistan for jihadi tourism.

=== Al-Quds Mosque, Hamburg ===
The Al-Quds Mosque in Hamburg, where Mohamed Atta often prayed, became a hub for jihadi tourism prior to its closure, as Islamic militants gathered to meet those with connections to terrorist organizations in Afghanistan. It was discovered by German authorities that 10 of the mosque's members had travelled to the border region of Pakistan and Afghanistan. In 2010, the mosque was closed by German security officials following suspicions that the mosque was again being used as a meeting place for Islamic extremists.

=== Somalia ===
Leaked US diplomatic cables have alleged that British and American Muslim citizens are travelling to Somalia to undergo training for terrorist attacks in the UK.

== See also ==
- War tourism
- Islamic terrorism
- Sex Jihad
- Halal tourism
