= Activate (organisation) =

2017–2018 British political organisation

- Formation: 29 August 2017
- Dissolved: 31 May 2018
- Members: 1,000
- National Chairman: Gary Markwell
- Secretary: Lewis Parkes
- Membership Director: Fizarn Adris
- Campaign Director: Luke Ibbotson

Activate was a British political organisation, which described itself as seeking to engage young people in centre-right politics. It was founded in August 2017 by young members of the Conservative Party. It had been compared to the left-wing group Momentum. The organisation was shut down on 31 May 2018 after less than 12 months.

== History ==
Sam Ancliff claimed that Activate "evolved" from a collaboration of a lot of different people from different communities of people looking for a new Conservative youth group following the suspension of Conservative Future. The group appointed Conservative councillor and campaign manager Gary Markwell as their chairman. Because of this, Red Pepper described it as a Conservative "astroturf" group.

The organisation was criticised when conservative blogger Guido Fawkes revealed that individuals within a WhatsApp group described by Fawkes as a "precursor" to Activate made comments about gassing "chavs", performing "medical experiments on them ... [using] them as substitutes for animals", as well as mandating "compulsory birth control on chavs". The Mirror claimed that at least two people involved in the chat had links to Activate. A spokesperson later said that none of the individuals "have any seniority" within Activate, and that they found the comments "sickening and are totally incompatible with what Activate is trying to achieve". The organisation had been criticised for being out of touch with younger people. The membership costs of up to £500 per person were widely seen as extortionate.

An Activate source claimed that one of the founders of the organisation had received death threats, and that almost all of the main figures within Activate had been targeted by abuse and harassment.

Having gained prominence in August 2017, Activate held a launch event in March 2018 in London, attended by 28 people in a room booked for 150. The event saw speeches from two Conservative councillors. Chairman Gary Markwell said at the launch, "It's amazing what a response Tommy Robinson and Britain First get on Facebook, how they engage people."

In Vice, Ben van der Merwe wrote that the organisation was "doomed from the start", having an "impossible mission".

== See also ==
- Conservative Collegiate Forum
- Conservative Future
- Federation of Conservative Students
- Moggmentum
- Young Conservatives (UK)
