= Activator =

Activator may refer to:

- Activator (genetics), a DNA-binding protein that regulates one or more genes by increasing the rate of transcription
- Activator (phosphor), a type of dopant used in phosphors and scintillators
- Enzyme activator, a type of effector that increases the rate of enzyme mediated reactions
- Sega Activator, a motion-sensing controller for the Sega Mega Drive/Genesis
- Activator technique, a method of spinal adjustment
- Activator appliance, an orthodontic functional appliance

== See also ==
- Activate (disambiguation)
- Activation
