= Marketing activation =

Execution of marketing mix plans

Marketing activation is the execution of the marketing mix as part of the marketing process. The activation phase typically comes after the planning phase during which managers plan their marketing activities and is followed by a feedback phase in which results are evaluated with marketing analytics.

Depending on the business objective, two types of marketing activation can be used as part of a marketing strategy.

- Brand activation, sometimes called brand engagement which focuses on building a longer term emotional connection between the brand and the customer.
- Activation based on direct-response marketing will focus on generating immediate sales transactions.

== Planning the activation ==
Before executing its marketing activities, a firm will benefit from identifying which customer groups to target. "By focusing on some fewer influencers only, activation can become more efficient and higher returns can be expected."

Customer data is a significant source of information for planning marketing activation. A common practice is to use customer relationship management (CRM) tools and techniques to augment the impact of marketing activation because CRM "provides an integrative framework in which marketing activation and customer activities collaborate to increase patronage"

== Challenges ==
A successful marketing activation will allow businesses to increase their profits and reach their strategic goals. There are however challenges that managers will face in putting in place a marketing activation program. One of the challenges is dealing with an ever-changing marketplace. Customer preferences and attitudes keep evolving and require managers to adapt rapidly. This poses a challenge because, for example, "direct marketing activation triggers that were accurate 6 months ago, may now be quite inappropriate."

Another challenge related to marketing activation has to do with reaching different target markets with culturally relevant propositions. McDonald's is said to be a good example of a company that can effectively reach a diverse audience. Among the techniques it uses, "it engages in unique marketing activation, including strong use of PR and events targeted at black, Asian, and Latino youth."

== Data-driven marketing activation ==
Over the years, marketing activation has become more and more data-driven. This allows marketers to be more precise in their actions, measure results more effectively, and increase returns. This phenomenon has become more and more important because "marketing activation usually entails a universal blast of information to all consumers. Often, only a small proportion of the consumers react positively to such activation, resulting to waste in marketing expenses. If a circle of influencers can be identified for certain events or phenomena, then such activities can be focused into a group of factors or individuals, thus, optimizing the outcomes."

Different types of data are used in marketing activation. For example, "video-based measurement (...) provides visibility into shopper engagement and behaviour relative to exact marketing activation, enabling a holistic approach to shopper marketing."

CRM data and models are also used to improve the effectiveness of marketing activation. One of these models, the marketing funnel, "is a key conceptual framework that is routinely used by practitioners to deconstruct the marketing activation and identify key issues."

== Digital brand activation ==
By the early 2010s, marketers were spending lavish sums on brand activations. At SXSW 2016, brand activations reportedly ranged from $500,000 up to $1.5 million, for campaigns that could only be experienced on-site over the short span of a few days.

The Digital Brand Activation emerged in reaction to this. Greg Ippolito, creative director of the digital marketing agency IMA, asked: “If the goal [of these brand activations] is to raise brand awareness and drive a specific action, why aren’t more marketers challenging themselves to do this digitally?”

Digital Brand Activations are online campaigns that serve the dual purpose of generating high-value MQLs while raising the awareness and value of a brand. It involves microtargeting a brand’s highest-value prospects, driving them inbound (via search and social), providing them with “an immersive, exhilarating experience,” nurturing them quickly through top-of-funnel, and converting them to opt-ins/leads.

== Online video ==
Marketing activation can be enriched with the use of other online tools. The advent of online video has opened up many opportunities for marketers who use it to engage customers in more compelling ways with new forms of advertising. YouTube, for example, "has given marketers a platform for celebrating and amplifying nearly every marketing activation."

== Sports marketing ==
Marketing activation techniques are commonly used in sports marketing. They are often associated with a brand sponsoring an athlete or an event in order to boost their brand awareness. It has been said that "with strong marketing activation and creativity, consumers should remember the sponsor's campaign"

== What it is not ==
Even though marketing activation encompasses most marketing activities a firm will execute, some approaches, in the fields of communication and customer service, may not qualify as marketing activation. For example, "public relations may be viewed as broad communication operation rather than a sharp marketing activation."
