= Palace Court, Bayswater =

Street in Bayswater, London

Coordinates: 51.511011°N 0.191958°W

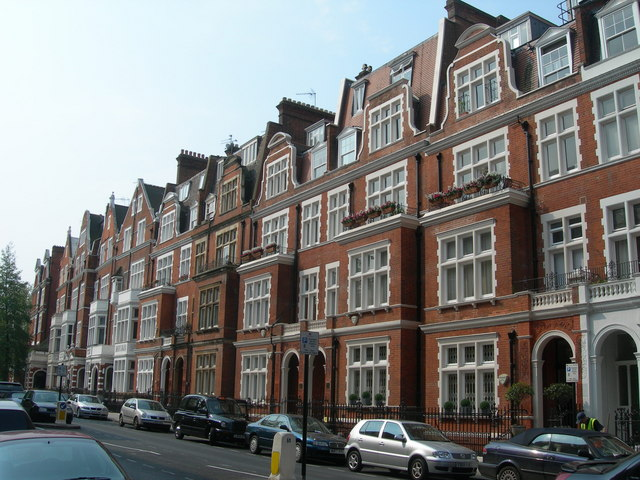
A terrace on Palace Court

Palace Court is a street in the Bayswater area of London. It runs from Bayswater Road in the south to Moscow Road in the north. Developed in the 1880s, later than the surrounding area, the road is considered to have microcosm of late Victorian architecture, particularly of the Arts and Crafts style.

== History ==
The site of the street was formerly occupied by a house built for the Countess of Shaftesbury and latterly used by Thomas Davidson as a mental asylum.

The first house, J. J. Stevenson's "Red House" was completed in 1871 but no longer stands. The rest of the street was developed into the 1890s. Similarly to Bedford Park, the architecture attracted artists and aesthetes. Among them were Aubrey Beardsley, Oscar Wilde, Francis Thompson. No. 47 was built for Wilfred and Alice Meynell by Leonard Stokes.

== Architecture and design ==
The older houses of the street are mostly in Arts and Crafts style, with terraces in design reminiscent to Jacobean and Flemish styles.

Listed buildings on the road are:

- No. 2 - Grade II
- No. 4 - Grade II
- Nos. 10 and 12 - Grade II*
- No. 14 - Grade II
- No. 47 - Grade II

== See also ==
- Moscow Road
- Bayswater Road
- Ossington Street
