= Meynell =

Meynell is the name of:

- Alice Meynell (1847–1922), wife of Wilfrid Meynell
- Esther Meynell (1878–1955), English writer
- Francis Meynell (1891–1975), poet and printer, son of Alice and Wilfrid Meynell
- Godfrey Meynell (1904–1935), army officer, awarded posthumous VC
- Hugo Meynell (1735–1808), politician and fox-hunter
- Hugo Francis Meynell Ingram (1822–1871), politician, greatgrandson of Hugo Meynell
- Hugo Anthony Meynell (1936–2021), English Christian philosopher, son of Godfrey Meynell
- Rhys Meynell (born 1988), footballer
- Viola Meynell (1885–1956), writer, daughter of Alice and Wilfrid Meynell
- Wilfrid Meynell CBE (1852–1948), newspaper publisher
