= Viola Meynell =

Viola Meynell, Mrs. Dallyn (15 October 1885 – 27 October 1956) was an English writer, novelist and poet. She wrote around 20 books, but was best known for her short stories and novels.

== Biography ==
Maynell was born in Barnes, London to Wilfrid Meynell and Alice Thompson Meynell, noted Roman Catholic publishers and writers. Her father was a publisher and her mother was the sister of the well-known artist Lady Butler (Charge of the Greys). Her parents had a chaotic and busy literary household in Palace Court, Notting Hill Gate, London. There was a constant stream of visitors such as Eric Gill, Robert Browning, Stevenson, Henley, Coventry Patmore, George Meredith, Francis Thompson, Stephen Phillips, W. B. Yeats, G. K. Chesterton, Shane Leslie, and Sir Ronald Storrs.

Viola had seven siblings. Her brother Francis was the driving force of The Nonesuch Press, with whom in the pre-war days she made homemade books on the kitchen table, dyeing with onion skins and typing her verse to be stitched by hand into the pages.

They had a second home in the country at Greatham, Sussex where Viola married local farmer John Dallyn, and had her only child, a son, John Jacob "Jake" Dallyn (born 1922).

She was an early supporter of D. H. Lawrence, offering practical help in the way of typing his manuscripts and accommodation, by way of a room in her home at Greatham. She was also a champion of Herman Melville at a time when he was unfashionable. In 1920 she engineered the publishing of Moby Dick as the first American novel in the Oxford World's Classics series in England and wrote the introduction to that volume. During Lawrence's stay at Greatham he wrote England My England, a thinly disguised and unpleasant jab at her family. Greatham became its own centre with visitors as varied as Eric Gill, Hilaire Belloc, and Cynthia Asquith.

Her books sold well, many of them being republished both in England and in America. She had a large circle of literary friends and correspondents, including Katherine Mansfield, Compton Mackenzie and T. H. White.

She died on 27 October 1956, and was interred in Houghton Catholic Church cemetery, near Greatham.

== Works ==
- Martha Vine (1910) – published anonymously
- Cross in Hand Farm (1911)
- Lot Barrow (1913)
- Modern Lovers (1914)
- Columbine (1915)
- Narcissus (1916)
- Julian Grenfell (1917)
- Second Marriage (1918)
- Verses (1919)
- Antonia (1921)
- Young Mrs. Cruse (1924)
- A Girl Adoring (1927)
- Alice Meynell (1929)
- The Frozen Ocean (1930) Poetry.
- Follow Thy Fair Sun (1935)
- Kissing The Rod (1937)
- Friends of a Lifetime: Letters to Sydney Carlyle Cockerell (1940) editor
- An Anthology of Nature Poetry (1942)
- Letters of J. M. Barrie (1943; editor)
- Lovers (1944)
- First Love and Other Stories (1947)
- Ophelia (1951)
- Francis Thompson and Wilfrid Meynell (1952)
- Louise and Other Stories (1954)
- The Best of Friends: Further Letters to Sydney Carlyle Cockerell (1956) editor
- Collected Stories (1957)

== Other works ==
- Eyes of Youth (1910) – a collection of poems by friends and family
- George Eliot (1913)
- Introduction to Romola: George Eliot (1913)
- Introduction to Felix Holt: The Radical (1913)
- Introduction to Moby Dick: Herman Melville (1925)

== Sources ==
- A Critical Biography of English Novelist, Viola Meynell, 1885-1956 (2002) by Raymond N. MacKenzie
