= George Rostrevor Hamilton =

Sir George Rostrevor Hamilton FRSL (1888–1967) was an English poet and critic. He worked as a civil servant and Special Commissioner. He was knighted in the 1951 King's Birthday Honours List.

He had a classical education at the University of Oxford, and later compiled anthologies of Latin and Greek verse for Nonesuch Press. He was a published war poet of World War I, known for A Cross in Flanders.

His book The Tell-Tale Article on the Auden Group made an impact by the expedient of counting the proportion of definite articles in Auden's verse, remarking that it was much higher than in older styles. In general he was a steady conservative in matters of literature.

He was a director of the Poetry Book Society, Vice-President of the Royal Society of Literature, and well connected as a correspondent of many literary and philosophical figures; including Walter de la Mare, C. S. Lewis, Wilfrid Meynell, Roy Fuller, Henri Bergson, E. R. Eddison and Owen Barfield.

== Works ==
- Stars and Fishes (1916) poems
- Escape and Fantasy 1918) poems
- Bergson and Future Philosophy: An Essay on the Scope of Intelligence (1921)
- Pieces of Eight (1923) poems
- The Soul of Wit (1924) anthology of epigrams
- The Making (1926)
- The Latin Portrait: An Anthology (1929) Nonesuch Press edited with Charles Stonehill.
- Light in Six Moods (1930)
- John Lord, Satirist (1934)
- Wit's Looking-Glass (1934) anthology of French epigrams
- The Greek Portrait (1934) Nonesuch Press editor
- Unknown Lovers (1935)
- Poetry and Contemplation: A New Preface to Poetics (1937)
- Memoir 1887-1937 (1938)
- The Sober War and Other Poems of 1939 (1940)
- Apollyon and other poems of 1940 (1941)
- The Trumpeter of Saint George (1941) poems
- Landmarks: A Book of Topographical Verse for England and Wales (1943) edited with John Arlott
- Hero or Fool? A Study of Milton's Satan (1944)
- Death in April (1944) poetry
- Selected Poems and Epigrams (1945)
- The Inner Room (1947) poetry
- The Tell-Tale Article: A Critical Approach to Modern Poetry (1949)
- Essays & Studies 1950 editor
- The Carved Stone (1952) poetry
- The Russian Sister (1955)
- Essays by Divers Hands XXVII (1955) editor
- Essays & Studies Jubilee Volume (1956) editor
- Guides and Marshals (1956)
- Collected Poems and Epigrams (1958)
- Walter Savage Landor (1960)
- Landscape of the Mind (1963)
- English Verse Epigram (1965)
- Rapids of Time, sketches from the past (1965)
