= Our Lady of England Priory =

Former Catholic priory in Storrington, England

Coordinates: 50.9166°N 0.4599°W

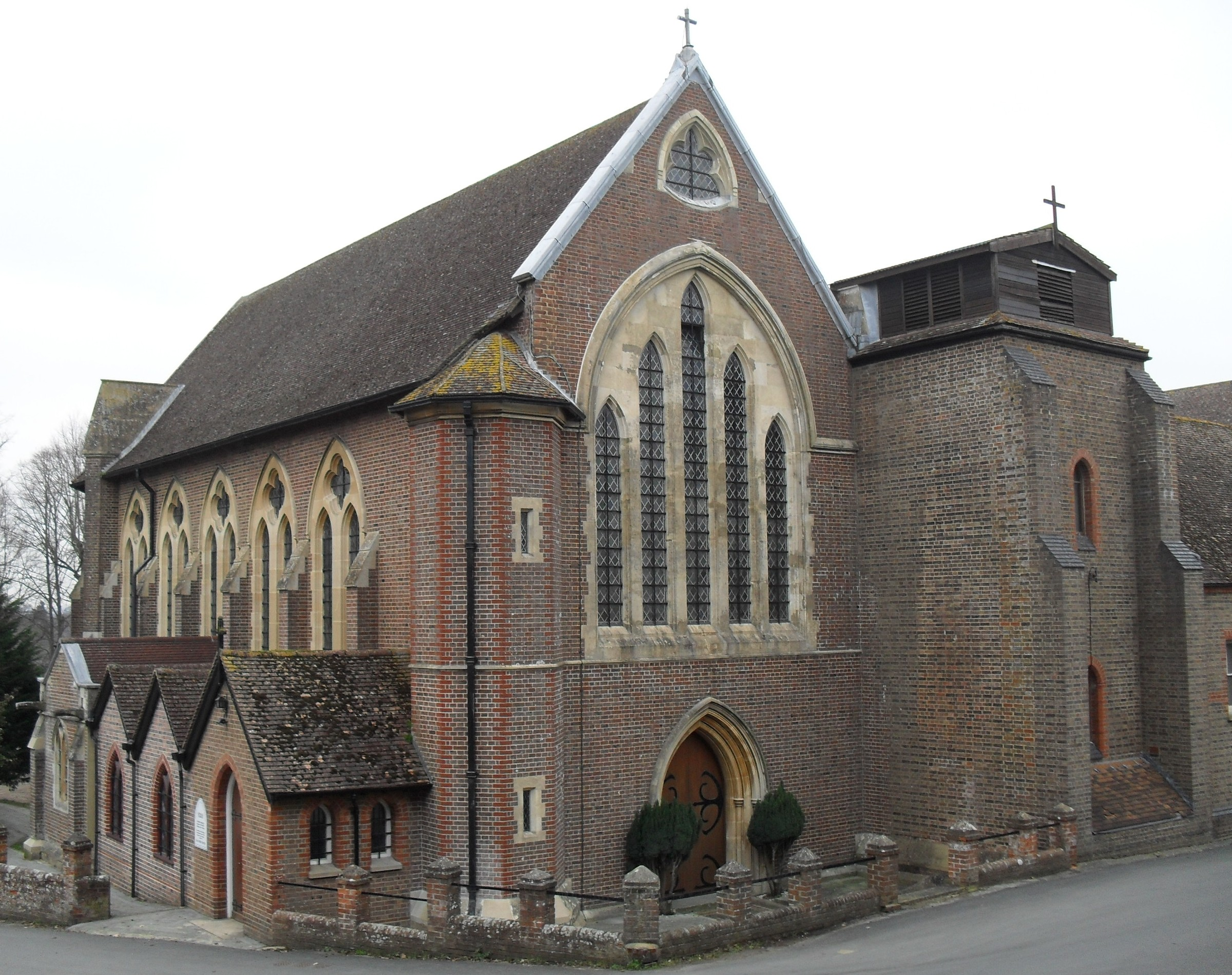
The Priory Church

Our Lady of England Priory in Storrington, West Sussex, England is the former home of Roman Catholic priests belonging to a Community of Canons Regular of Prémontré, (or 'Premonstratensians') after the place where they were founded in France in 1121. The priests are also known as Norbertines after Norbert of Xanten, the founder of the order. Because of their white habits, another name for members of the Order is White Canons. The priests follow the Rule of St Augustine.

== History ==
A Premonstratensian priory was opened in 1888 by a community of Canons who came over from France in 1882. The land the Priory is built on was granted by Henry Fitzalan-Howard, 15th Duke of Norfolk, and the foundation stone of the Priory Church was laid in 1902 by Cardinal Bourne, Archbishop of Southwark. The Church, designed by Edward Goldie, is brick with stone dressings and was completed in 1904. It houses the Shrine to Our Lady of England, the shrine statue being the work of the Austrian sculptor Ferdinand Stueflesser.

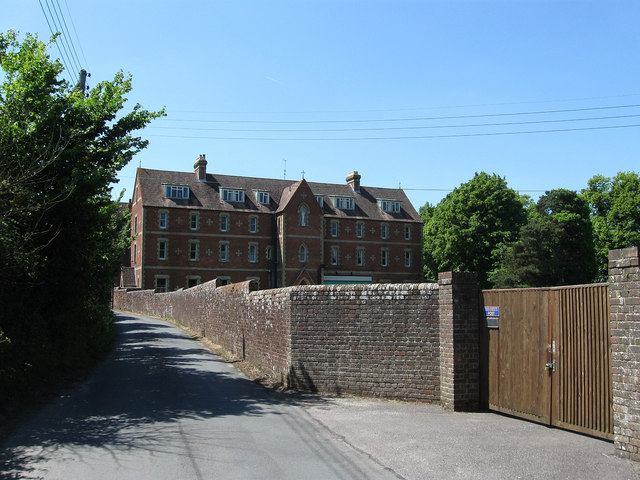
Our Lady of England Priory

The first Prior of Storrington Priory was a French White Canon, Father Xavier de Fourvière (born Albert Rieux in 1853 in the Provençal village of Robion. He was one of many French priests exiled from France in the early 1900s – he arrived to settle there in 1903 – following the aggressive acts of separation of Church and State by the French government. Xavier de Fourvière was a renowned writer, poet and charismatic preacher, a member of Frédéric Mistral's famous "Félibrige" movement for the Provençal language. He preached often at the church of Our Lady of France, Leicester Square, London where he was taken ill in May 1912, returned to Provence (hoping the sun would secure his restoration) but he died in October 1912 and is buried in his birthplace, Robion.

The poet Francis Thompson stayed at the Priory nearly two years after being brought there by Wilfrid and Alice Meynell to recover from opium addiction. He wrote the poem To Daisy during his stay. Also, Hilaire Belloc wrote the poem On Courtesy on 17 May 1908 after visiting the Priory.

The Chemin Neuf Community uses the buildings, still owned by the Church and licensed to the community by the Order who left in the early 2010s after over 130 years. The Community conducts retreats and various programs at the priory.
