= 10 and 12 Palace Court =

Pair of houses in Bayswater London

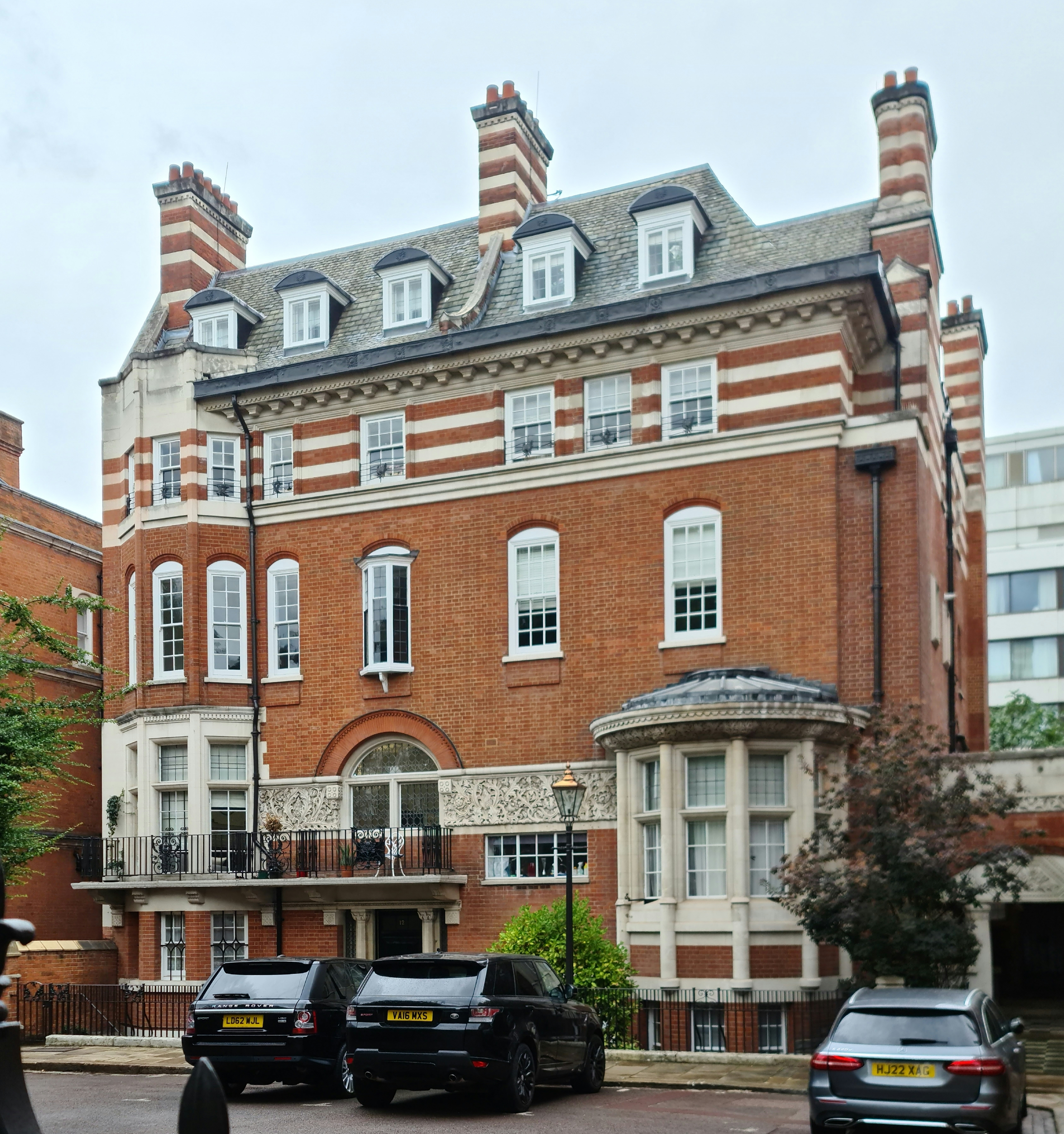

General information
- Type: Residential
- Architectural style: Arts and Crafts
- Location: Bayswater, London, England
- Coordinates: 51°30′38″N 0°11′28″W
- Completed: 1890

Design and construction
- Architect: James MacLaren

Listed Building – Grade II*
- Official name: 10 AND 12, PALACE COURT W2
- Designated: 25 September 1951
- Reference no.: 1065877

10 and 12 Palace Court are a pair of Grade II* listed houses in Bayswater, London.

== History ==
The houses are on Palace Court, a road developed relatively later than most of Bayswater. The houses were completed in 1890 to the design of James MacLaren. They were built to house the two married daughters of shipowner Donald Currie.

== Architecture ==
The houses were built in the Arts and Crafts style, used elsewhere on the street, which was gaining popularity at the time. Built of red brick with Portland stone embellishments. Notable features are a stone frieze and irregular bays. Its overall asymmetrical nature was common among Arts and Crafts homes of the time.

The houses were Grade listed II* in 1951 for their architectural value.

== See also ==
- 47 Palace Court
- Palace Court, Bayswater
