= James MacLaren (architect) =

Scottish architect (1853–1890)

James Marjoribanks MacLaren (12 January 1853 – 20 October 1890) was a Scottish architect associated with the Arts and Crafts movement and the development of Scottish Vernacular architecture. He was a major influence on Charles Rennie Mackintosh, and designed buildings in London, the Canary Islands, Stirling and Fortingall in Perthshire.

== Early life and education ==
MacLaren was the sixth of 11 children of John MacLaren, a farmer at Middleton of Boquhapple, Thornhill, Callander, and his first wife Janet Downie. MacLaren was educated at the village school and at Stirling High School.

== Architecture education and career ==
In about 1868 he moved to join his three elder brothers in Glasgow and was articled to Salmon Son & Ritchie. In 1875, he moved to London, joined the Architectural Association and began work as an assistant to Richard Coad - who recommended MacLaren to the Royal Academy Schools in January 1876.

During 1878, he was in the office of the Surveyor of Public Buildings for the County of Surrey.

During the early 1880s, he lived at 40 Montpelier Square, London, with his brother Thomas, also an architect.

In 1884, MacLaren went into partnership with Coad, but also began to develop his own practice, which he eventually established as an independent venture in late 1887 at 21 King William Street, London, having just won a competition to design Stirling High School and the patronage of Sir Donald Currie MP. That year, he was also commissioned to design a hotel for the Canary Islands Company at Las Palmas, a stopping place for Currie's Castle route, but became ill with tuberculosis.

In various projects for Currie, he developed a strong architectural style that influenced Charles Rennie Mackintosh's designs for Windyhill (Kilmacolm) and the Hill House. His pupils included Sir Robert Lorimer.

In 1886, while working on Ledbury Court, Herefordshire, MacLaren encountered the country chairmaker Philip Clissett at nearby Bosbury. The meeting resulted in an iconic ladderback chair that furnished many Arts and Crafts establishments, including the meeting room of the Art Workers Guild, and inspired Ernest Gimson to learn chairmaking from Clissett himself.

== Illness and death ==
MacLaren caught a severe chill which brought on early symptoms of tuberculosis, a disease of which the MacLarens had a family history. At the age of 37 in October 1890, he died and was buried in Hampstead, London, England.

== Projects ==
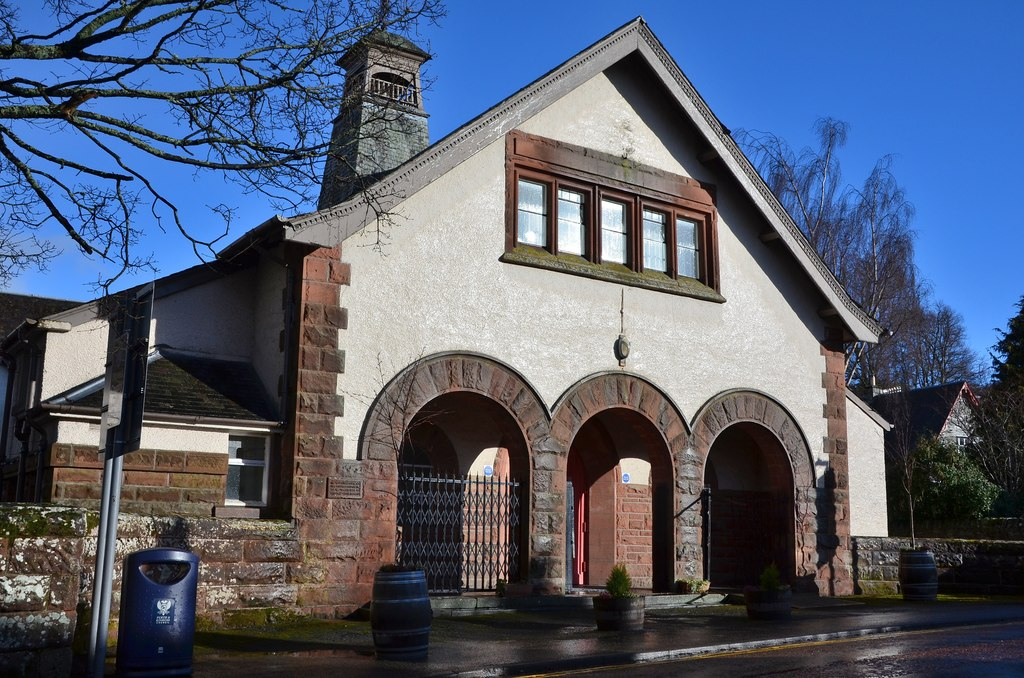
Aberfeldy Town Hall, built in 1889

- Two large houses in Grangemouth (1877)
- Artist's house (for sculptor HR Pinkes), 22 and 22A Avonmore Road in Fulham, south-west London (1888-1889)
- Two houses in Bayswater, London (1890)
- Ledbury Park, Herefordshire
- Stirling High School (1887-1890 - this building, in Spittal Street, is now the Stirling Highland Hotel)
- Aberfeldy Town Hall (1889)
- Buildings in Glenlyon estate, Perthshire
- Fortingall Hotel, Perthshire
