= Arthur Hirtzel =

British civil servant

- Born: Frederic Arthur Hirtzel; 14 May 1870; Minehead, Somerset, England
- Died: 2 January 1937 (aged 66); Fairford, Gloucestershire, England
- Occupation: Civil Servant
- Spouse: Olive Ransome

Sir (Frederic) Arthur Hirtzel GCB (14 May 1870 – 1 January 1937) was a British civil servant in the India Office and an academic.

== Biography ==
Frederic Arthur Hirtzel was born in Minehead, Somerset on 14 May 1870, the only child of Frederic and Florence Hirtzel. He started his education at a preparatory school in Croydon and in 1882 went to Dulwich College. From Dulwich he proceeded to Trinity College, Oxford, where he gained a First in Classical Moderations (Greek and Latin) in 1891 and a First in Literae Humaniores (Greek and Roman history and Philosophy) in 1893. He won a Craven Scholarship in 1891. From 1895 to 1902 he was a Fellow of Brasenose College, Oxford.

In 1899 he married Olive Ransome; the couple had three daughters and one son.

He entered the India Office in 1894. His first important posting came in March 1901 when he was appointed Private Secretary to Sir Arthur Godley, Permanent Under-Secretary of State for India. He later acted as Private Secretary to Sir John Morley, the Secretary of State for India, while he was promulgating what came to be known as the Morley-Minto Reforms which came into effect in 1909. Following this, he became Secretary in the Political Department from 1909 to 1917, followed by being appointed as the assistant under-secretary and then the deputy under-secretary of state during the period 1917 to 1924. Finally, he became the permanent under-secretary of state during the period 1924 to 1930 when he retired.

He was appointed a Companion of the Order of the Bath (CB) in 1907 and a Knight Commander of the same order (KCB) in 1911.

During the period 1925 to 1930, he was also Chairman of the Board of Governors at his old school, Dulwich College.

His main residences were 47 Palace Court, London, which he occupied during much of his official and married life, and East End House, Fairford, Gloucestershire, a spacious, three-storeyed property dating back to 1640 with later additions in the 1730s and 1890s.

Perhaps surprisingly, Hirtzel never set foot in India, and his holidays were spent in Minehead and Cornwall.

== Publications ==
- P. Vergili Maronis Opera. Recognovit brevique adnotatione critica instruxit Fredericus Arturus Hirtzel, Oxford: Clarendon, 1900.
- Imperial Christianity (reprinted from The East and the West), 1913.
- The Church, the Empire, and the World, London: SPCK, 1919.
- South Persia and the Great War: Discussion, The Geographical Journal, 58:2, August 1921, 117–8. [Discussion by Edmund Barrow, Arthur Hirtzel, George Napier and Charles Yate, 116-9, of Sir Percy Sykes, 'South Persia and the Great War', The Geographical Journal, 58:2, August 1921, 101–16.]
