= Alix Kilroy =

British public servant

Dame Alix Hester Marie Kilroy, Lady Meynell, DBE (1903–1999) was one of the first two women to have entered the administrative grade of the Civil Service by examination (in 1925).

She was given a desk at the Board of Trade, where she ascended to Under-Secretary and where she served for 30 years (aside from a brief spell at the newly formed Monopolies Commission). She retired in 1955. She marked her 95th birthday by publishing a new book: What Grandmother Said (published February 1998), was the last of her writings. Her 1988 autobiography, Public Servant, Private Woman, charted her progress through government.

== Early years ==
"A.K." or "Bay" as she was known to friends, was the daughter of a Surgeon Commander of the Royal Navy, educated at Malvern Girls' College and at Somerville College, Oxford, where she read Modern Greats. Her unconventional relationship (without benefit of marriage until 1946) with Francis Meynell, a poet, book designer and founder of Nonesuch Press, was childless, although she was devoted to her husband's large family of nephews and nieces. Marriage in 1946 bestowed, as the wife of a "K" (he was knighted that year), the title of "Lady", although this honorific was, technically, to be trumped by the DBE awarded her in 1949.

At about the end of the Second World War, the couple acquired "Cobbold's Mill" between Lavenham and Hadleigh, Suffolk, and there, for more than 20 years, they combined keeping open house to a multitude of friends with, until retirement, pursuit of their respective careers. She and her husband took up small-scale farming there. She was also active in anti-Suez activism and early post-war socialism. She was chair of the Southeastern Gas Consultative Council from 1956. Later, she was to become a founder-member of the SDP, and as late as the 1997 election she encouraged her friends to vote Lib-Dem rather than Labour on the grounds that this could end the Conservative stranglehold on Suffolk South; however, it did the opposite.
