= Scottish Guards (France) =

Personal bodygards to the French monarchy

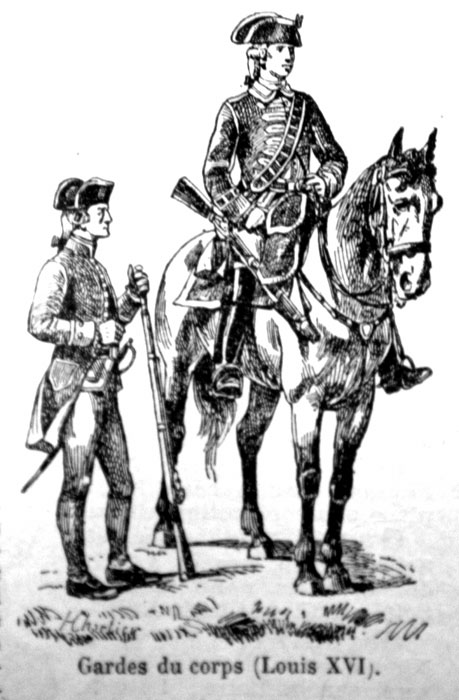
Bodyguardsmen of Louis XVI

The Scottish Guards (French: Gardes Écossaises) was a bodyguard unit founded in 1418 by the Valois Charles VII of France, to be personal bodyguards to the French monarchy. They were assimilated into the Maison du Roi and later formed the first company of the Garde du Corps du Roi (Royal Bodyguard).

In 1450, King James II sent a company of 24 noble Scots under the command of Patrick de Spens, son of his custodian. This company took the name of archiers du corps or gardes de la manche. On 31 August 1490, this company, these of Patry Folcart, Thomas Haliday, and a part of the company of Robin Petitloch, became the first company of archiers de la garde du roi under the command of Guillaume Stuier (Stuart). At the beginning la compagnie écossaise des gardes du corps du roi included 100 gardes du corps (25 bodyguards and 75 archiers). Each bodyguard had four men-at-arms under his command, (a squire, an archer, a cranequinier and a servant), one of them acquired the name of premier homme d'armes du royaume de France. They were finally disbanded in 1830 at the abdication of Charles X.

== History ==
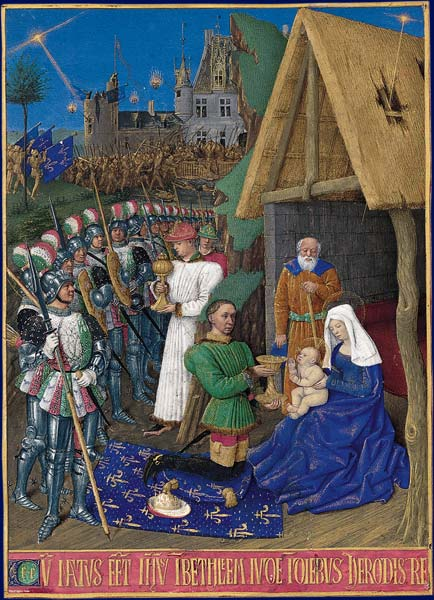
Charles VII of France depicted as a magus and surrounded by his Scottish guards (left)

=== Overview ===
After 1295, and the agreements that would become known as the Auld Alliance, there is documentary evidence of French soldiery in Scotland or Scottish soldiery in France.

From the outset of the Hundred Years War, there were Scottish companies officially fighting for Philip VI of France. At the Battle of Poitiers in 1356, the 1st Earl of Douglas and the future 3rd Earl of Douglas fought for John II of France; the future 3rd Earl was captured along with many Scottish knights, as was the French king himself. In the 1360s, Scotsmen were to be found in the army of Bertrand du Guesclin. In the early 15th century France was split into Armagnac-Burgundian civil strife following Charles VI's descent into madness. Henry V of England saw his opportunity, allied himself with John the Fearless, and invaded France. The Dauphin despairingly sought allies, and found them amongst the Scots and the Castilians.

=== La Grande Armée Écossaise ===
In 1418, Robert Stewart, Duke of Albany, appointed his son, John Stewart, 2nd Earl of Buchan, Chamberlain of Scotland, to command the Scottish expeditionary force, the largest army that medieval Scotland had ever sent abroad. 7000-8000 men arrived at La Rochelle in October 1419 and made their way to Tours to greet the Dauphin. The first thing the future Charles VII did was to shower munificence upon the Scottish nobles. Buchan received Châtillon-sur-Indre, the Earl of Wigtoun received Dun-le-Roi, Sir John Stewart of Darnley received Concressault, and Aubigny, and Thomas Seton the castle of Langeais. The Scottish leaders were persuaded to return to Scotland to recruit more troops. The Scottish leadership returned in 1420 with another 4000-5000 reinforcements. While their leaders were at home the Dauphin assigned the Scottish contingent throughout his armies and garrisons and picked a number, roughly one hundred of the best warriors, to be his personal body guard. The Scotsmen fought with distinction throughout France with a notable win at the Battle of Baugé in 1421, where the Duke of Clarence was said to have been felled by Buchan's Mace. The Scots faced a calamity at the Battle of Verneuil in 1424, when they lost 6000 men. Although saddened by the loss of so many of his loyal Scotsmen, Charles VII continued to honour the survivors. The Scots had a further setback at the Battle of the Herrings in 1429. The Scottish Army in France fragmented into free companies (a headache for the French state), and also into Compagnies d'ordonnance within the French Army.

=== The Royal Bodyguard ===
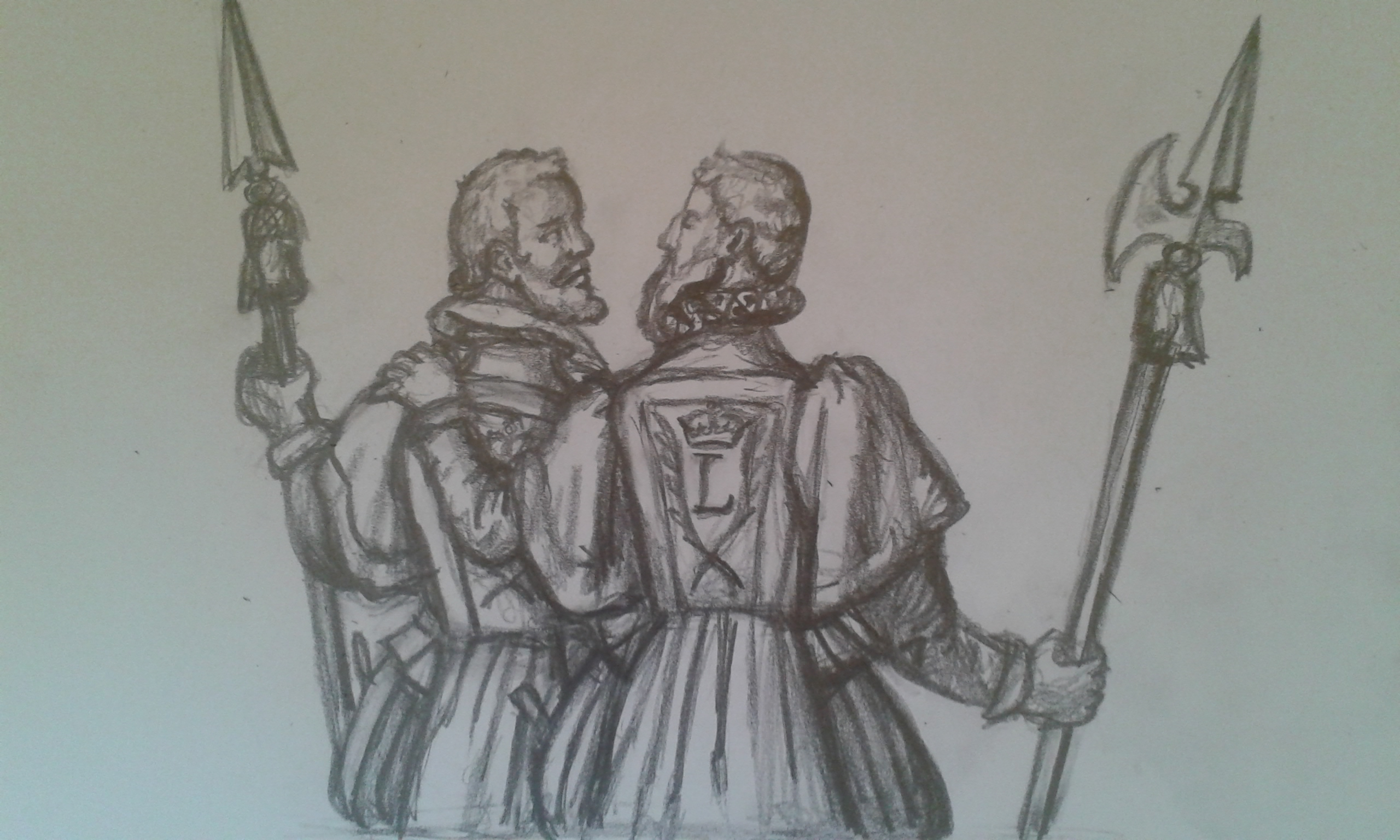
Gardes Écossaises from the time of Louis XIII. They wear the uniforms worn between the reigns of Charles VIII and Louis XIV.

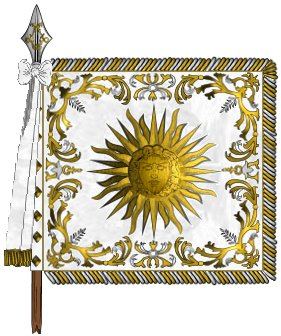
Standard of the "Scottish company", the 1st company of the royal Garde du Corps

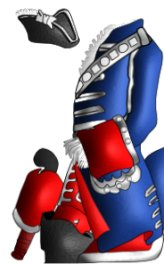
Uniform of the Scottish guards by 1757

The King kept about him his Garde Écossaise. The Scottish Guards had likely protected him during the murder of John the Fearless at the bridge of Montereau, and rescued him from a fire in Gascony in 1442. Scottish Guards fell at the Battle of Montlhéry defending their king, Louis XI of France, in 1465.

=== Later history ===
The Garde Écossaise survived until the end of the Bourbon monarchy as the senior or Scottish Company of the Gardes du Corps (Body Guards). There were four companies of Body Guards and a detachment of them accompanied the French King wherever he went, posted guards on his sleeping place and even escorted his food from kitchen to table.

During the reign of Francis I the garde were held up by blizzards near the Simplon Pass after a defeat at the Battle of Pavia in 1525. Some of the men reputedly settled there and their descendants became known as the "Lost Clan".

From the 16th century onwards, recruitment of the unit was primarily from Frenchmen and the Scottish element gradually died out. The name was retained as were certain words of command which had originated in Scots. In 1632, the Earl of Enzie began to rebuild a Scottish regiment in France. There is sometimes confusion as to which unit actually held the title of Garde Écossaise, with several regiments in service often being conflated, especially those commanded by Sir John Hepburn, James Campbell, 1st Earl of Irvine (later commanded by Sir Robert Moray) and Colonel James Douglas. As an example some works recording Scots in action have simply applied the Garde Écossaise name, although referring to the Regiment de Douglas.

By the reign of Louis XV, the Scottish Company numbered 21 officers and 330 men in a mounted unit which last saw active service when they escorted Louis at the Battle of Lauffeld on 1 July 1747. On this and other occasions the Scottish Company carried claymores with steel basket guards instead of the swords of the other French heavy cavalry. They were distinguished from the other companies of the Body Guards by wearing white bandoleers garnished with silver lace.

The Scottish Company provided a special detachment of 24 Gardes de la Manche (literally 'Guards of the Sleeve') who stood in close attendance to the king during court ceremonies. The name indicated that they stood so close to the monarch as to be brushed by his sleeve. The Gardes de la Manche were distinguished by a heavily embroidered white and gold cassock which they wore over the blue and red and silver uniform of the Body Guard.

=== Final disbandment ===
All four companies of the Body Guard were formally disbanded in 1791, although the aristocratic personnel of the regiment had dispersed following the closure of Versailles as a royal palace in October 1789. They were re-established at the time of the First Bourbon Restoration under an ordinance dated 25 May 1814. Until their final dissolution in 1830, the Senior Company retained the title of les fiers Ecossais ('the proud Scots').

=== Notable Guardsmen ===
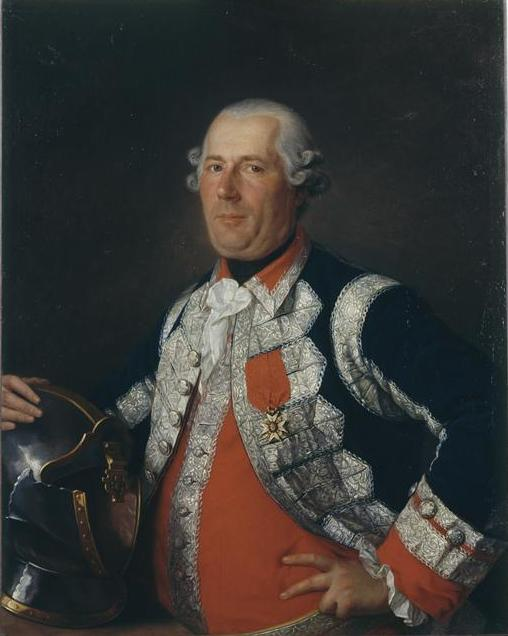
Monsieur Bergier, an Officer of the Scottish Guards (18th century)

- Jean Stuart, earl Darnley, lord d'Aubigni and Concressault, killed in 1429 at Orléans
- Robert or Robin PetitLoch, sénéchal des Lannes (1419–1461)
- Christin Chamber knight (1425–1447)
- Patris Folcart (1449–1461)
- Patrick Neiven - Killed at Orléans in 1429
- Thomas Haliday(1449–1461)
- Patrick de Spens, Lord of Bohapple and Estignols,écuyer des écuries du roi (1450–1485)
- Guillaume Stuyers, Lord of Maulleon,écuyer des écuries du roi (1461–1464)
- Thomas Stuyers (1465–1472)
- Robert Coningham (1475–1478), Lord of Cherveux and Villeneuve.
- Jean de Coningham, bailly de Chartres, conseiller et chambellan du roi (1479–1492)
- Berault Stewart or Stuart, Lord of Aubigny, conseiller et chambellan du roi, knight of the order of Saint-Michel (1492–1508)
- Godebert (Cordebert Chandeber(t)) Carre (Carr), lord de St Quentin and Perrigny, brother in law of B. Stuart, captain of Amboise (he sold this charge to Pierre de Rohan, Marechal de Gie in 1497) and participated in the wars in Italy (Capitano de la Rocca of Milan)
- Robert Stewart or Robert Stuart, Lord of Aubigny, maréchal de France in 1515, knight of the order of the King (1470–1543)
- Jacques de Motgommery, lord de Lorges, conseiller et chambellan du roi (1543–1556)
- Gabriel, comte de Montgomery, lord de Lorges (1530–1574), who mortally injured King Henry II in a jousting accident.
- Jacques de Montgommery, lord of Lorges, knight of the order of the King (1555–1561)
- Sir John Hepburn
- Sir Robert Moray
- Charles de La Vieuville, Captain of the Guards, later Superintendent of Finances
- Robert Sempill, Ensign in the Guards
- Sir Donald Cameron, Lord Lochiel, an exiled Jacobite chieftain, Knight of the Order of Saint-Michel (1746-1748)
- Antoine de l'Hoyer, a Knight of the Order of St John and a Knight of the Order of St Louis, also a notable guitarist and composer (1768–1852)

== The Garde Écossaise in fiction ==
- Quentin Durward by Walter Scott
- Bonnie Prince Charlie: A Tale of Fontenoy and Culloden by G. A. Henty
- Queens' Play by Dorothy Dunnett
- La Guarde Ecossaise by Kirsteen M. MacKenzie, a series of novels featuring John Hamilton.

== See also ==
- Auld Alliance
- Battle of Culloden, 1746
- Flight of the Wild Geese
- Gallowglass
- Mercenary
- Swiss Guards (French)
- Walloon Guards (Spanish)
