= William Meynell =

William Meynell may refer to:

- Alice Meynell
- William Meynell (MP) for Derbyshire (UK Parliament constituency)
