= Jeannette Augustus Marks =

American educator (1875–1964)

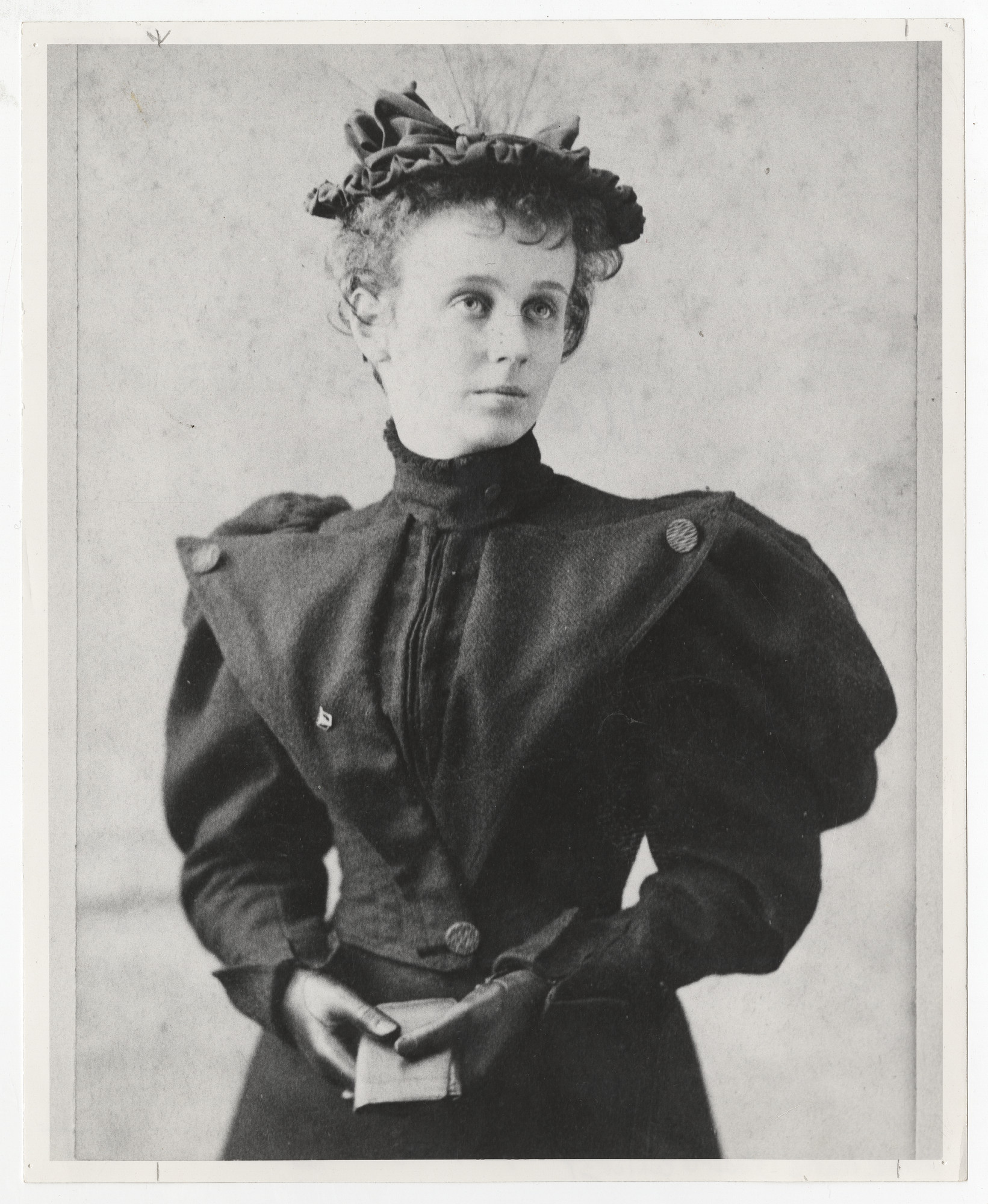
- Jeannette Augustus Marks as a young woman, circa 1895-1905
- Born: August 16, 1875; Chattanooga, Tennessee
- Died: March 15, 1964 (aged 88); Westport, New York
- Occupation: Professor of English at Mount Holyoke College
- Political party: National Woman's Party
- Partner: Mary Emma Woolley (1899—1947)
- Relatives: Mabel Marks Bacon (sister)

Jeannette Augustus Marks (August 16, 1875 – March 15, 1964) was an American professor at Mount Holyoke College. She is the namesake of the Jeannette Marks Cultural Center (formerly known as the Lesbian, Bisexual, and Transgendered Community Center), which provides support and programming for LGBT students and allies.

== Early life and education ==
Born on August 16, 1875, in Chattanooga, Tennessee, her parents were Jeannette Holmes (née Colwell) and William Dennis Marks, who was the president of the Philadelphia Edison Company, after working at University of Pennsylvania, where he taught engineering. As her parents were estranged, Marks grew up mainly in the company of her mother and younger sister, Mabel, alternating homes between the parental properties in Philadelphia and Westport, New York.

Marks attended boarding schools in Europe and the United States. She then attended Dana Hall School and Wellesley College. In 1899 she met Mary Emma Woolley, a Wellesley professor, with whom she entered into a relationship that lasted 48 years. In 1900, she earned a bachelor's degree and three years later she earned her Masters'.

== Career ==
From 1901 to 1939, Marks taught at Mount Holyoke College, where she was a professor of English Literature. She founded a lecture series to discuss modern literature at the college named the Play and Poetry Shop Talks, which featured established poets and authors. She also founded the Laboratory Theatre in 1928, where she was its director until 1941.

She was involved with the New York State branch of the National Woman's Party as a member and from 1942 to 1947 as its chair. She contributed with money to socialist causes and advocated for Eugene V. Debs and Nicola Sacco and Bartolomeo Vanzetti.

Marks was acquainted with the writer Alice Meynell, whom she viewed as a mentor. In 1923, shortly after Meynell's death, Marks wrote, "Like a child my mind has kept step with hers for many years, and like a child it still runs beside her, looking up, using her living words, following her thought."

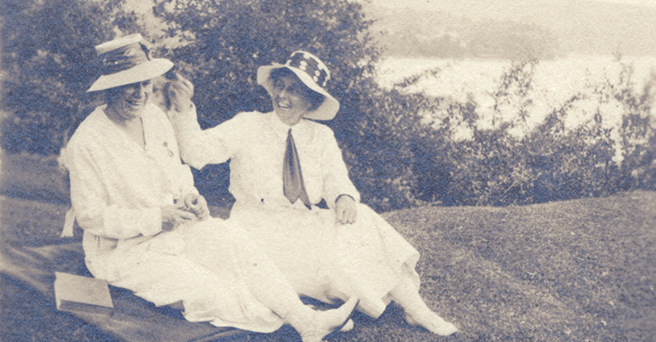
Mary Emma Woolley and Jeannette Augustus Marks

== Later life and death ==
Marks lived in Westport, New York with Woolley. After Marks retired in 1941, the women spent the summers at the home of the Marks family, Fleur De Lys, on Lake Champlain. They lived there full-time from 1944, after Woolley suffered a stroke. Woolley died in 1947. Marks died in Westport, New York, on March 15, 1964, and is buried there at Hillside Cemetery.

== Works ==
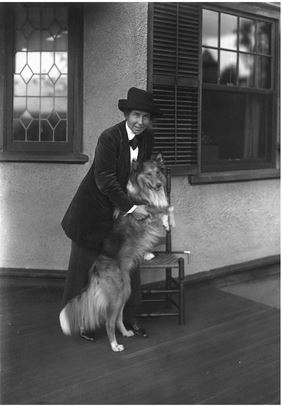
Jeannette Augustus Marks with her collie at Fleur de Lys

Marks is the author of:

- A Brief Historical Outline of English literature; From the Origins to the Close of the Eighteenth Century. Pawtucket, Rhode Island: J.W. Little & Co. 1902.
- The Cheerful Cricket and Others. Boston: Small, Maynard and Co. 1907. Illustrations by Edith Brown.
- English Pastoral Drama from the Restoration to the Date of the Publication of the "Lyrical ballads" (1600-1798). London: Methuen & Co. 1908.
- Little Busybodies; The Life of Crickets, Ants, Bees, Beetles, and Other Busybodies. New York and London: Harper & Brothers. 1909. Co-authored with Julia Moody.
- Through Welsh doorways. Boston and New York: Houghton Mifflin Company. 1909. Co-authored with Adrian J. Iorio, illustrations by Anna Whelan Betts.
- A Holiday with the Birds. New York, London: Harper & Brothers. 1910. Co-authored with Julia Moody
- The End of a Song. Boston and New York: Houghton Mifflin Company. 1911.
- A Girl's Student Days and After. New York, Chicago, [etc.]: Fleming H. Revell Company. c. 1911. Co-authored with Mary Emma Woolley.
- Gallant Little Wales; Sketches of its People, Places and Customs. Boston and New York: Houghton Mifflin Company. 1912.
- Leviathan: The Record of a Struggle and a Triumph. New York: Hodder & Stoughton and George H. Doran Company. c. 1913. Co-authored with George H. Doran.
- Vacation Camping for Firls. New York and London: D. Appleton and Company. 1913.
- Early English Hero Tales told by Jeannette Marks. New York and London: Harper & Brothers. c. 1915.
- Three Welsh Plays: The Merry Merry Cuckoo, The Deacon's Hat, Welsh Honeymoon. Boston: Little, Brown, and Company. 1917.
- Courage Today and Tomorrow. New York: The Womans Press. c. 1919.
- Willow Pollen. Boston: The Four Seas Company. 1921.
- The Sun Chaser: A Play in Four Acts. Cincinnati: Stewart Kidd. 1922.
- Genius and Disaster; Studies in Drugs and Genius. New York: Adelphi Company. 1925.
- Thirteen Days. New York: A. & C. Boni. 1929.
- The Family of the Barrett: A Colonial Romance. New York: Macmillan. 1938. A biography of the family of Elizabeth Barrett Browning.
- The Life and Letters of Mary Emma Woolley. 1955.
- B. Roland Lewis (ed.). Contemporary One-Act Plays. Project Gutenberg. Other authors include Jeannette Augustus Marks, Arthur Hopkins, Oscar Monroe Wolff, Eugene Pillot, David Pinski, Hermann Sudermann, Beulah Bornstead, August Strindberg, Lady Gregory, Anton Pavlovich Chekhov, Percy MacKaye, Alfred Kreymborg, J. M. Barrie, Paul Hervieu, Bosworth Crocker, George Middleton, Althea Thurston, and Paul Green.
