= Ossington Street =

Street in Central London

Coordinates: 51°30′39.2″N 0°11′33.3″W

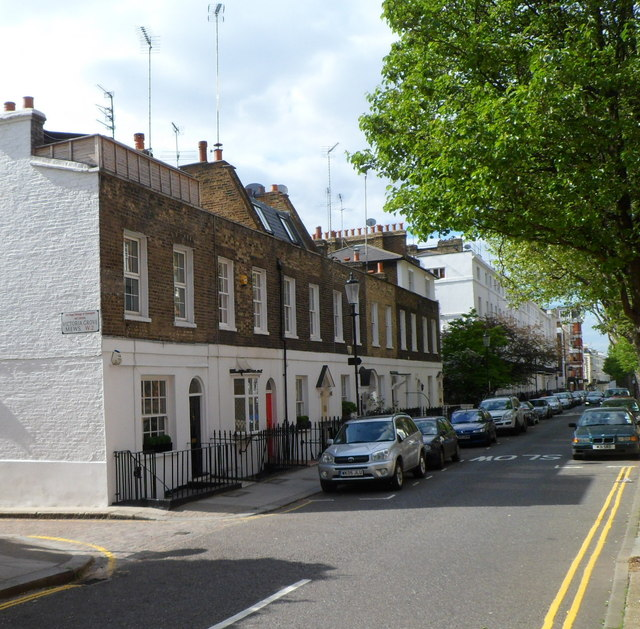
Ossington Street

Ossington Street is a quiet one-way street in London, W2, leading from Moscow Road at its north end to the Bayswater Road / Notting Hill Gate at its south end.

Ossington Street forms part of the border between the boroughs City of Westminster and the Royal Borough of Kensington and Chelsea, with the east side of the street belonging to Westminster and the west side to Kensington. It is possible that the street was named after Viscount Ossington.

Despite its minor nature, Ossington Street is one of the more notable 'runs' of The Knowledge in the area, as a route for taxi drivers to get from Westbourne Grove to Notting Hill Gate.

The nearest Tube station to Ossington Street is Notting Hill Gate, followed by Queensway and Bayswater.

== History ==
Ossington Street was originally laid out from the then Uxbridge Road to Moscow Road on part of Gravel Pit field in the 1830s. It was known at the time as Victoria Grove, and was renamed to Ossington Street in 1873 and transferred to Kensington. (The renaming of Victoria Grove as Ossington Street took place a year after John Evelyn Denison, a former Speaker of the House of Commons, was created 1st Viscount Ossington and retired.) The buildings to the west side were in the form of terraced cottages of two storeys and basement, with a mews behind. Victoria Grove Mews retains its name to this day.

Several of the terraced houses to the south were leased to William Ward, a Marylebone builder, who also filled a space along the Uxbridge Road between Victoria Grove and the then boundary of Paddington with an inn and five shops, nos. 1 to 6 Wellington Terrace, around 1840.

By 1865, almost all of Bayswater had been built up and the only sites for infilling were south of Moscow Road and in particular along the east side of Victoria Grove. This was built up as Palace Court, whose west side backs on Ossington Street and offers some of the most interesting late Victorian domestic architecture in the area.
