= Rollie McKenna =

American photographer

- Born: Rosalie Thorne; November 15, 1918; Houston, Texas
- Died: June 14, 2003 (aged 84); Northampton, Massachusetts
- Occupation: Photographer

Rosalie Thorne "Rollie" McKenna (November 15, 1918 – June 14, 2003) was an American photographer. Writers photographed by McKenna include Sylvia Plath, Robert Frost, Dylan Thomas, and Truman Capote. McKenna had a long-term friendship with John Malcolm Brinnin, who helped her come in contact with many of the people she photographed. In addition to portraiture, McKenna also had an interest in architecture, particularly the architecture of Stonington, Connecticut.

== Early life and education ==
Rosalie Thorne was born to a wealthy family shortly after World War I in Houston, Texas. When she was three years old, her mother and father separated, and sent her to live with her grandparents in Mississippi. A portion of her childhood was spent growing up in the resort her grandparents Henry Brown and Mabel Marks Bacon owned, called The Inn by the Sea, where she encountered a wide of variety of individuals. Several years later, when Rollie was eleven, her mother came back into her life after being remarried and spent some time running the business with her family. Shortly after the Great Depression started, the family's life altered greatly and, as a result, Rollie ended up being sent from relative to relative for years to come. She went on to pursue a degree at Vassar College in American history in 1938 and proceeded to earn a master's degree in art history in 1948. Between degrees, she took some time off and joined the U.S. Navy and, shortly after, married Henry Dickson McKenna in 1945. The couple divorced in 1950.

== Career ==
McKenna's first literary portrait was of Truman Capote, in Florence in 1950. Included among her subjects were W. H. Auden, T. S. Eliot, Edith Sitwell, Seamus Heaney, Sylvia Plath, Ted Hughes, John Minton, Ezra Pound, Robert Frost, Eleanor Roosevelt, Leonard Bernstein, the actor James Earl Jones and the United States poet laureate Richard Wilbur.

== Exhibitions ==
From March 1 through March 13, 2001, McKenna's portraits including but not limited to: W. H. Auden, T. S. Eliot, Dylan Thomas, Ezra Pound, Sylvia Plath, Ted Hughes and artists including Bill Brandt, Laura Gilpin, John Minton and Henry Moore were displayed in the National Portrait Gallery at St. Martin's Place in London, England. Rollie McKenna: Artists & Writers, was McKenna's first European exhibition. An accompanying book featuring the portraits was also sold during the time of the exhibition.

McKenna's work is also featured in the National Portrait Gallery at the Smithsonian Museum in Washington, D.C., United States. Her portrait of Elizabeth Bishop, a Pulitzer Prize winning poet from Worcester, Massachusetts, was taken in 1951.

In 2018, The Stonington Historical Society in Stonington, Connecticut, created an exhibition in her honor. McKenna, who formerly lived and worked in the town, took many photos aside from her famous portraits. A Village Love Affair: A New Photography Exhibit & Publication Featuring Rollie McKenna's Images of Stonington displays her documentary-style black and white photography of people, places and events in the town. Along with the physical exhibition, the Stonington Historical Society also published a 100+ page book of her photographs titled, A Village Love Affair: Rollie McKenna's Stonington. This book is a broad collection of the photography of small-town Connecticut, a place McKenna quietly lived and used to express her personal photographic creativity.

== Later years and death ==
McKenna spent a majority of her life photographing a vast array of subjects well into the 1980s before settling down in Stonington, Connecticut. She spent the latter half of her life photographing Stonington, capturing the essence of the town and the people who lived there, along with the historical architecture that surrounded the area. She also published multiple books before her death, including a memoir titled A Life in Photography in 1991, and another about her close friend, the poet Dylan Thomas, titled Portrait of Dylan: A Photographer's Memoir. McKenna died in Northampton, Massachusetts, on June 14, 2003, at the age of 84.

In 2018, the Stonington Historical Society created an exhibit called "The Village Love Affair", which featured interviews with her, some work never seen before, and some of her past work that featured photographs of Stonington.
