= Mabel Marks Bacon =

American hotelier (1876–1966)

- Born: Mabel Marks; December 17, 1876; Philadelphia, Pennsylvania
- Died: December 14, 1966 (aged 89); Panama City, Florida
- Other names: Mabel Bacon, Mabel M. Bacon
- Occupation: hotelier
- Years active: 1921–1958
- Relatives: Jeannette Augustus Marks (sister)

Mabel Marks Bacon (December 17, 1876 – December 14, 1966) was an American hotelier. She designed and operated several prominent hotels along the Gulf Coast in the 1930s. In the 1910s she was known for her skill with sailing, skippered a portion of a race from New York to Bermuda in 1910, and learned to drive in 1911. She raised her children in Maine and Panama, where the family lived while her husband was employed by the Panama Canal Company.

In 1921, after returning to the United States, Bacon ran a hotel known as the Inn-by-the-Sea in Pass Christian, Mississippi, which was a luxury resort built by her husband. Losing the hotel during the Great Depression, the family lived on board a boat for several months before landing at Dauphin Island, Alabama. Leasing the abandoned Fort Gaines from the government, they ran The-Sea-Fort-Inn until they discovered property while sailing along the Santa Rosa Sound. In 1935, they moved to Mary Esther, Florida, where Bacon designed and ran Bacon's-by-the-Sea. The hotel was frequented by several movie production companies and stars and was listed in 1954 as one of the top ten hotels in America in Look.

== Early life ==
Mabel Marks was born on December 17, 1876, in Philadelphia, Pennsylvania to Jeanette "Nettie" Holmes (née Colwell) and William Dennis Marks. Her father was a noted engineer, originally from St. Louis, Missouri, who taught at the University of Pennsylvania and later became president of the Edison Electric Light Company. During the height of his fame, he was painted by Thomas Eakins, and his portrait is now in the permanent collection of the Mildred Lane Kemper Art Museum. Her mother, originally from Chattanooga, Tennessee, raised the daughters and enjoyed playing both the piano and zither, as well as riding horses. Mark's older sister, Jeannette, known in her youth as "Gussie" would grow up to become a writer and a professor at Mount Holyoke College. Their parent's marriage was estranged and the girls lived with their mother, periodically in Philadelphia, as well as at their home on Lake Champlain, near Westport, New York. The family dynamic was marked by indifference and ambivalence, without close ties. Though well-to-do, the girls were mostly taught at home sporadically by a stream of governesses. Her education ended after a two-year attendance at a boarding school in Dresden, Germany, where she, her mother, and her sister had located to enable Gussie's treatment for rheumatic fever.

After their return to the United States, the girls, and their mother primarily lived in Westport until her mother's health began to decline and she was sent to a sanitorium. She died around 1894 and soon thereafter, Marks married her second cousin, Henry Douglas Bacon (1876–1948). H.D. was the son of Frank Page Bacon and Mamie (née Cooper) and grandson of Henry Douglas Bacon, an early philanthropist who had banking interests in St. Louis and San Francisco. After the banking collapse of 1855, grandfather Bacon moved to Oakland and donated his extensive art collection to the University of California. As had been the case in his wife's family, H. D.'s parents had been estranged and divorced soon after Frank inherited his father's estate. The couple married over their family objections, as their union caused H.D. to quit school in his senior year at the Virginia Military Institute.

The Bacons first lived in California, where their daughter Mabel, known as "Bell", was born in 1898, but were living in Scotland in 1900, when their son Henry Douglas Jr. (1900–1925) was born. A month after his birth, in March 1900, the family returned to the United States to settle in Philadelphia. In 1903, they moved to Bath, Maine, where H.D. began working in the shipyard of the Bath Iron Works. In 1904, H.D. bought Thorne Island near the eastern shore of the Kennebec River as a summer camp and deeded it to Bacon. The couple's third child Francis Page was born in Maine in 1908. Besides raising the children, Bacon was an accomplished sailor and in 1910 made headlines in the New York Times when she participated in a motor boat race from the New York Motor Boat Club to Bermuda, which touted that she was the first woman to participate in powerboat race, was going to skipper the boat, and that she had a steamboat pilot's license. She made the news again in 1911 when she took up driving a car. In 1916, H.D. was hired to head one of the shipyards for the Panama Canal project, and the family relocated to Panama, though they kept their home in Maine and returned periodically over the next 3–4 years.

== Career ==
In 1921, H.D. who was heading the shipbuilding department of the Foundation Company in New Orleans, Louisiana, bought property to develop as a hotel near Pass Christian, Mississippi. He designed the hotel, but Bacon operated it. Soon after the couple relocated, their three-year-old granddaughter, Rollie, came to live with her grandparents, when Bell and her first husband, Henry Thorne divorced. In 1922, Bacon' last child, William Dennis was born, and he and Rollie grew up together at the large estate. By 1924, the Inn-by-the-Sea was well-known on the Gulf Coast and had become a popular entertainment spot. The large Spanish-influenced property featured a patio ringed with Japanese lanterns which jutted to the water, allowing dancing on the deck. A 1925 expansion included a crescent of cottages facing the beach, a large water garden, and an ice manufacturing plant and the following year, 36 additional rooms were added. The couple and their extended family lived a life of luxury, building yachts and sailing, while the children enjoyed the swimming pools and ponies on the estate. When the stock market crashed in 1929, the family sold their belongings to pay the mortgage and left Mississippi with the children and two servants aboard a borrowed boat.

For several months, the group sailed up and down the Alabama and Mississippi coastline, fishing for food. They came ashore on Dauphin Island, Alabama, taking refuge from a storm and discovered the abandoned Fort Gaines. Leasing the property from the government, the couple spent several months renovating the property and then opened The-Sea-Fort-Inn. They were able to eke out a living in Alabama until 1935, when the couple discovered a property in Mary Esther, Florida while sailing near Fort Walton Beach in Santa Rosa Sound. Buying the lot, Bacon designed a Tudor-style hotel along the waterfront. Known as Bacon's-by-the-Sea, the property featured cottages under the trees and gained a reputation for fine dining, manicured gardens, and comfort. By 1942, H.D. and Mabel had divorced, but Bacon continued running the property until 1958 when she sold it and retired.

During the war, the hotel was frequented by servicemen stationed at nearby Eglin Field and Jimmy Doolittle and Hap Arnold stayed in a couple of the cottages. A tablecloth now in the Air Force Archives at Wright-Patterson AFB, Ohio was taken from Bacon because it contained planning notes on Doolittle and Arnold's plans for the Tokyo raid. When Doolittle and Arnold moved out, Van Johnson moved into one of the suites formerly occupied by the generals in 1944, as the hotel served as the home base for filming of Thirty Seconds Over Tokyo. In 1949, screenwriter Sy Bartlett and director Henry King completed the script for Twelve O'Clock High while staying at Bacon's-by-the Sea. During filming, the picture's star, Gregory Peck, also booked in to Bacon's. In the January 12, 1954 issue of Look, Bacon's was listed as #6 of the top 10 hotels in the United States by Duncan Hines. Look had secured agreement from the noted restaurant critic to have a film crew accompany him and his wife on a tour throughout America to rate the top 10 hotels out of all 44 states they visited.

== Death and legacy ==
Bacon died December 14, 1966, in Panama City, Florida after an illness of several years and was buried in the Mary Esther Cemetery on December 16. After Bacon's death, the hotel that she established was purchased, and an attempt was made to bring back the prestige it had earned during Bacon's lifetime. The venture did not succeed as in 1978, its zoning as a hotel was grandfathered with the stipulation that a hotel be built on the site again within five years. No hotel had yet been completed by 1985.
