= Richard Coad =

English architect (1825–1900)

- Born: 13 February 1825; Liskeard, Cornwall, England
- Died: 1 November 1900; Battersea, London, England
- Occupation: Architect
- Practice: Independent practice, Liskeard (from 1864); London office (from 1868)

Richard Coad (13 February 1825 – 1 November 1900) was a 19th-century Cornish architect.

Born in Liskeard, Cornwall, he was articled to Henry Rice of Liskeard and subsequently worked as assistant to Sir George Gilbert Scott from 1847 to 1864. He was clerk of works on the Albert Memorial in London, and worked under Scott's supervision on improvements to Lanhydrock House near Bodmin in 1857.

He returned to Liskeard in 1864 to open his own independent practice, and opened a London office in 1868.

When the building at Lanhydrock was severely damaged by fire in 1881, Coad returned to the site to rebuild the house to accommodate the 2nd Baron Robartes's large family.

From 1884 to 1887, Coad worked in association with James Marjoribanks MacLaren, who had been his assistant for some years. The pair worked on an extension to Ledbury Park in Herefordshire, an important work in the development of the Arts and Crafts architectural style in England.

He died in Battersea, London in 1900, and was buried in West Norwood Cemetery.
