= William Mendel =

Financier (1854-1917)

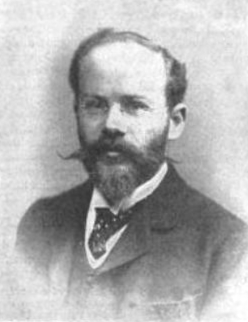
- In The Sketch, 21 July 1897
- Born: 19 June 1854; Elmshorn, Duchy of Holstein
- Died: 3 January 1917 (aged 62); Hans Mansions, London, United Kingdom
- Occupations: Financier, investor
- Known for: Financing Harrods in 1889
- Spouse: Edith Wynne Jones (m. 1894)
- Children: 3

William Mendel (1854–1917) was a British financier who with his partners arranged funding for several businesses in Britain during the late 19th and early 20th century. These included Harrods, Dickins & Jones, and D H Evans. Some of their money making activities were controversial and evidence was given in court that they paid inducements to newspapers for favourable reviews.

== Early life ==
Mendel was the son of Rosa and Isaac Mendel, born on 19 June 1854 in Elmshorn, Pinneberg, Duchy of Holstein. He was a merchant in China for a period and in the mid 1880s worked in London for the former Hong Kong Bank chairman, Baron Adolf von André. Mendel became a partner of this business in 1886. (Note: When Mendel joined the partnership it was called André, Reiners & Co. Reiners returned to Germany and the partnership in Britain became André, Mendel & Co.) In 1889 he was appointed a director of Trustees, Executors, and Securities Insurance Corporation (Limited), a business that made money from promoting and underwriting companies.

== Harrods ==
In 1889 Charles Digby Harrod sold his interests in Harrods departmental store to a company called Harrod’s Stores (Limited). The capital for this was raised via a stock market flotation, underwritten by André & Mendel. They received their commission plus 466 £1 founders’ shares of the 1400 that were issued. Their annual dividend from these shares was significant, for example in 1911-12 a £1 founders share paid a dividend of 5800%. Other holders of founders' shares included three directors of Harrod's Store: Alfred J. Newton, Edgar Cohen and Sir James Bailey.

The store went through a difficult period after Charles Harrod left, and income dropped. Harrod was asked to return and he recommended a new general manager be appointed called Richard Burbidge who had worked for Whiteley's - one of the largest stores in London. Burbidge started in 1891 and soon recommended a major expansion plan for the store. To achieve this, an extra £100,000 investment was required, and William Mendel was appointed to the board to help raise the capital.

The shareholders were either ungrateful to Mendel or unaware of the part he had played because in 1899, when he came up for re-election by rotation to the board of directors, the shareholders rejected him due to his poor attendance record at meetings. A special shareholders meeting was convened at which the chairman persuaded the shareholders to accept him back and he was re-appointed.

Further funding was required in 1914 when Harrods Buenos Aires was created. Mendel travelled to Argentina to make his own assessment of the scheme and negotiate the business arrangements before the prospectus was published in September 1913. As a show of confidence in the scheme, the Harrods directors sub-underwrote large portions of the shares on offer.

Mendel was also involved with the purchase by Harrods of Dickins & Jones in 1914. A prospectus was issued explaining that Mendel had obtained the option from Sir John Prichard-Jones to buy a large portion of the shares. He offered these to Harrods and as a gesture contributed £5000 of his commission towards the purchase.

== Further dealings in retail ==
Following on from their success with Harrods, Mendel and his partners promoted the stock market flotation of several other retail outlets in the 1890s, invariably taking founders' shares. These included:

Company	Year of flotation	Ordinary Shares	Preferential Shares	Founders' Shares	Debentures
D. H. Evans & Co.	1894	£120,000	£160,000	£2,000	£100,000
J. R. Roberts' Store.	1894	£150,000	£50,000	£2,500	£100,000
Ben Evans & Co.	1895	£100,000	£30,000	£3000	£75,000
Louise & Co.	1895	£80,000	£80,000	£3,000	
R & J Pullman	1895	£140,000	£70,000	£3,000	
J. Casse et Fils	1895	£100,000	£90,000	£3,000	
Paquin	1896	£250,000	£250,000		
Auxiliary Stores	1897	£70,000	£210,000	£1,400	
Maison Virot	1897	£70,000	£140,000		

Mendel’s fellow directors at Harrod’s were also involved in these deals. The chairman of Harrods, Alfred Newton, became chairman of D. H. Evans and J. R. Roberts. Edgar Cohen was chairman of Louise & Co., whilst James Bailey and Richard Burbidge were directors of D. H. Evans and others.

The company that Mendel and André operated during this period was called Industrial Contract Syndicate (Limited). In 1896 they created a company called Industrial Contract Corporation (Limited) with directors James Jackson (Chairman), Newton, Bailey and Burbidge. Mendel and André maintained control of the business by retaining founders' shares that gave them powers to override directors and shareholders. This new business became involved with the purchase and sale of a store in Clapham, London called Grice and Son. The purchase price was about £17,000 and the sale price £48,000. It transpired that the directors selling the business and those buying were the same individuals, but this was not declared on the prospectus nor was the profit they made from the deal.

A dispute with the shareholder led to the prospects of a winding-up procedure in public court. This was avoided with a compromise agreed between the parties but Alfred Newton, who had just been elected Lord Mayor of London, asked for the case be re-opened so that the whole matter could be given a public hearing. During the case, evidence was given that Mendel had written to several of the influential newspapers of the period, asking for favourable reviews of the flotation, and these letters were followed up with financial inducements.

Because the case was purely an examination, the judge, Mr Justice Wright, was not required to provide a ruling but he summarized at the end. He said that the memorandum of articles of association were a scandal; they gave Mendel and André the same voting rights as the shareholders and another clause excused the directors from any liability.

== Other activities ==
André & Mendel were involved with other business interests including railroads and mining. The Investors' Review of October 1898 attempted to identify their involvements with mining companies in Western Australia but found it almost impossible to untangle the web of dealings.

== Family ==
Mendel married Edith Wynne Jones in 1894 and they had three children, Beatrix Mary Wynne, Vera Rosalind Wynne and Reginald William. Mendel became a naturalised British citizen in 1889. He died on 3 January 1917 in 31 Hans Mansions, London - one of the Harrod's apartments. Probate indicated that he left £63,710.

Daughter Vera married Francis Meynell, who founded the Nonesuch Press with her financial support.
