= Moscow Road =

Street in Central London

Coordinates: 51.51237°N 0.19084°W

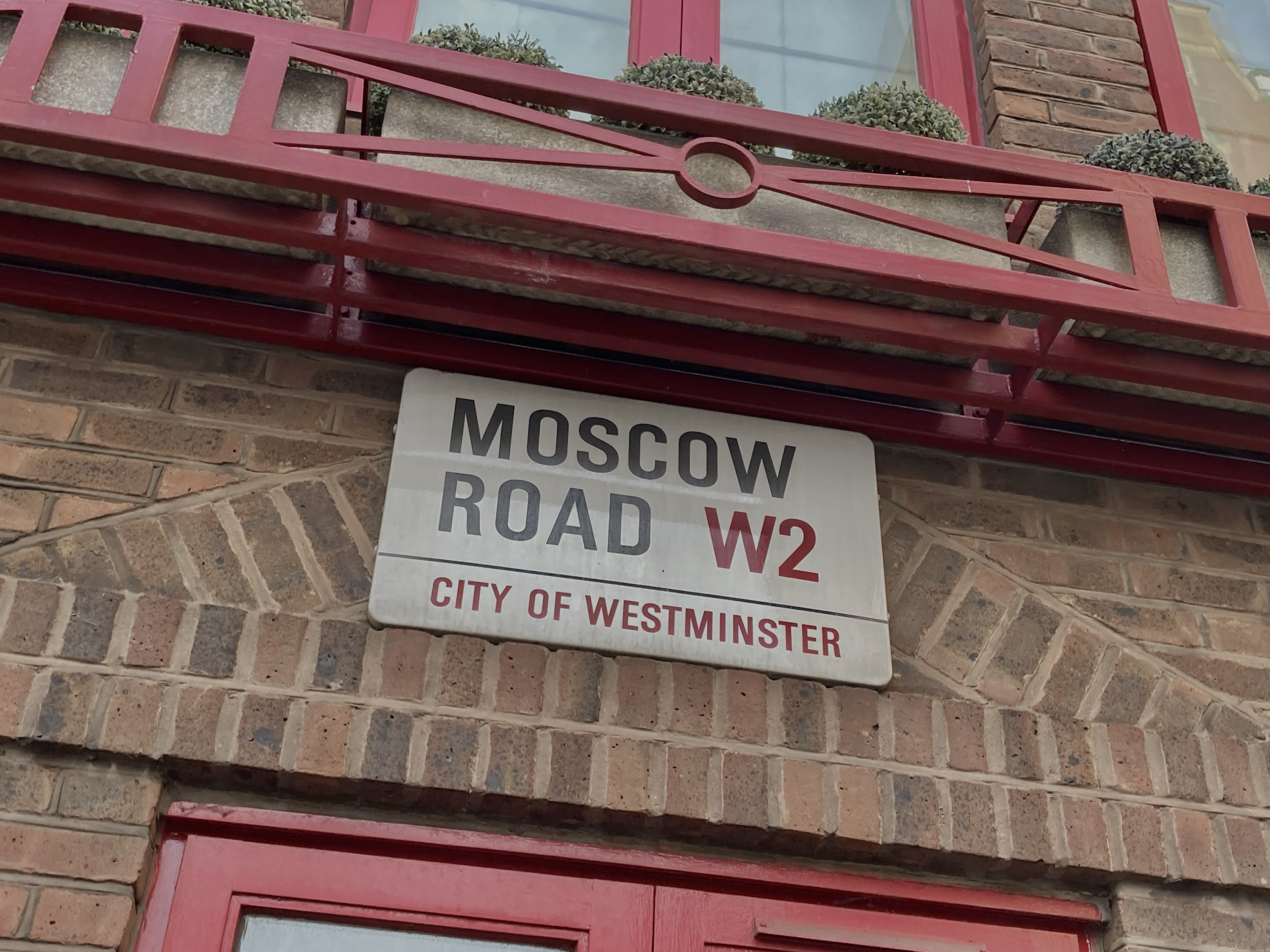
A road sign.

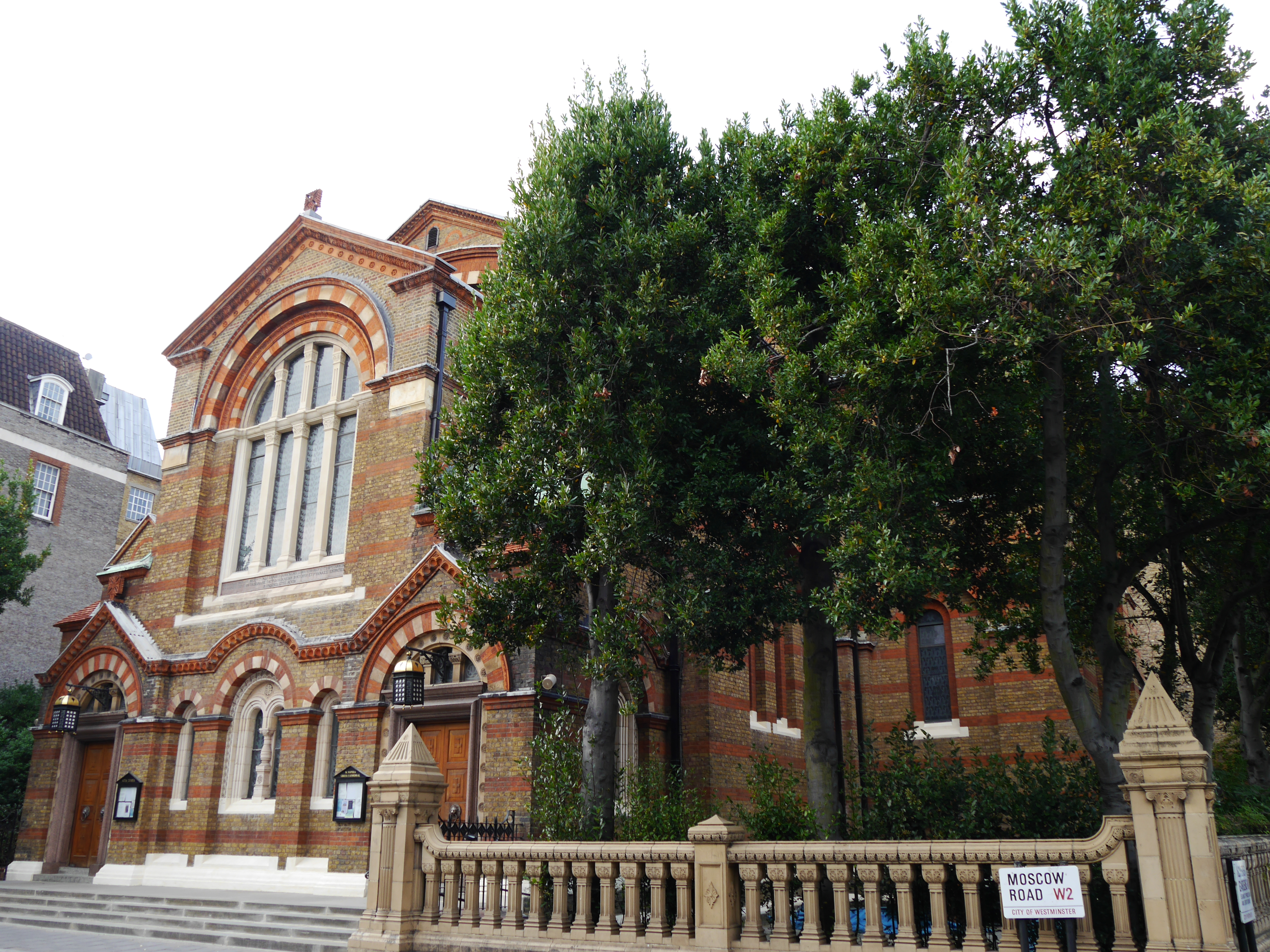
Saint Sophia Cathedral, London

Moscow Road is a street in the Bayswater area of London. Located in the City of Westminster, it runs eastwards from Queensway to Pembridge Square. It was developed by the painter, publisher, and property pioneer Edward Orme in 1814–15, as part of the rapid expansion of the city in the Regency era. It was named in commemoration of Tsar Alexander's participation in the Allied sovereigns' visit to England as part of the victory celebrations following the Napoleonic Wars. An adjacent street was named Petersburgh Place. During the nineteenth century Moscow Road became a centre of the Greek diaspora in London. In 1879 the Greek Orthodox Saint Sophia was opened as a church on the road, and in 1922 became a cathedral. The residential Ossington Street runs off it. Several pubs are today located along the road.

== Bibliography ==
- Cockburn, J. S., King, H. P. F. & McDonnell, K. G. T. & A History of the County of Middlesex. Institute of Historical Research, 1989.
- Panayi, Panikos. Migrant City. Yale University Press, 2020.
