= Alice Meynell =

English poet and suffragist (1847–1922)

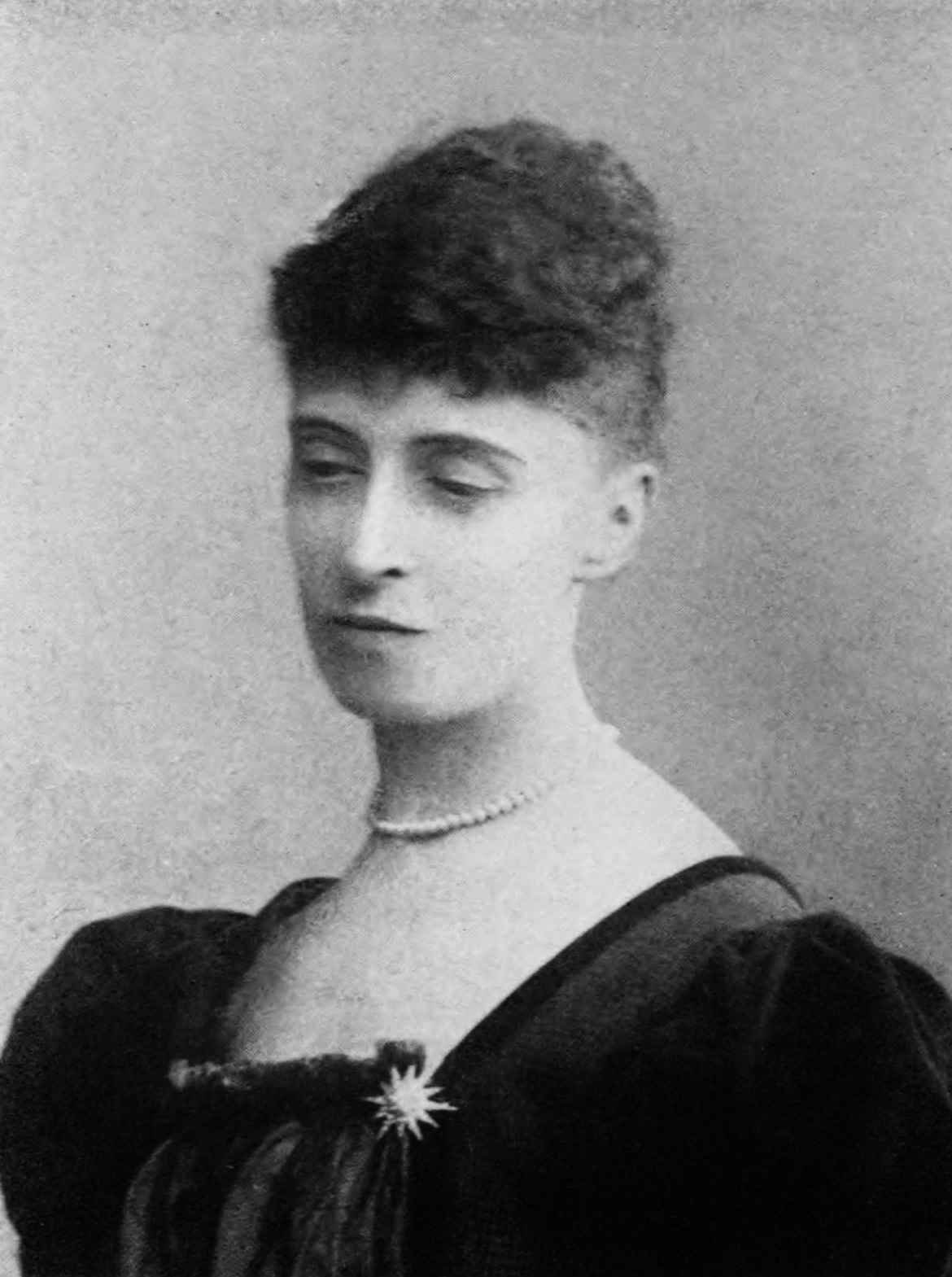
- Meynell in 1912
- Born: Alice Christiana Gertrude Thompson; 11 October 1847; Barnes, London, England, United Kingdom of Great Britain and Ireland
- Died: 27 November 1922 (aged 75)
- Resting place: Kensal Green Catholic Cemetery
- Occupations: Poet and publisher
- Spouse: Wilfrid Meynell
- Children: 8, including Viola Meynell and Francis Meynell
- Relatives: Elizabeth Thompson (sister)

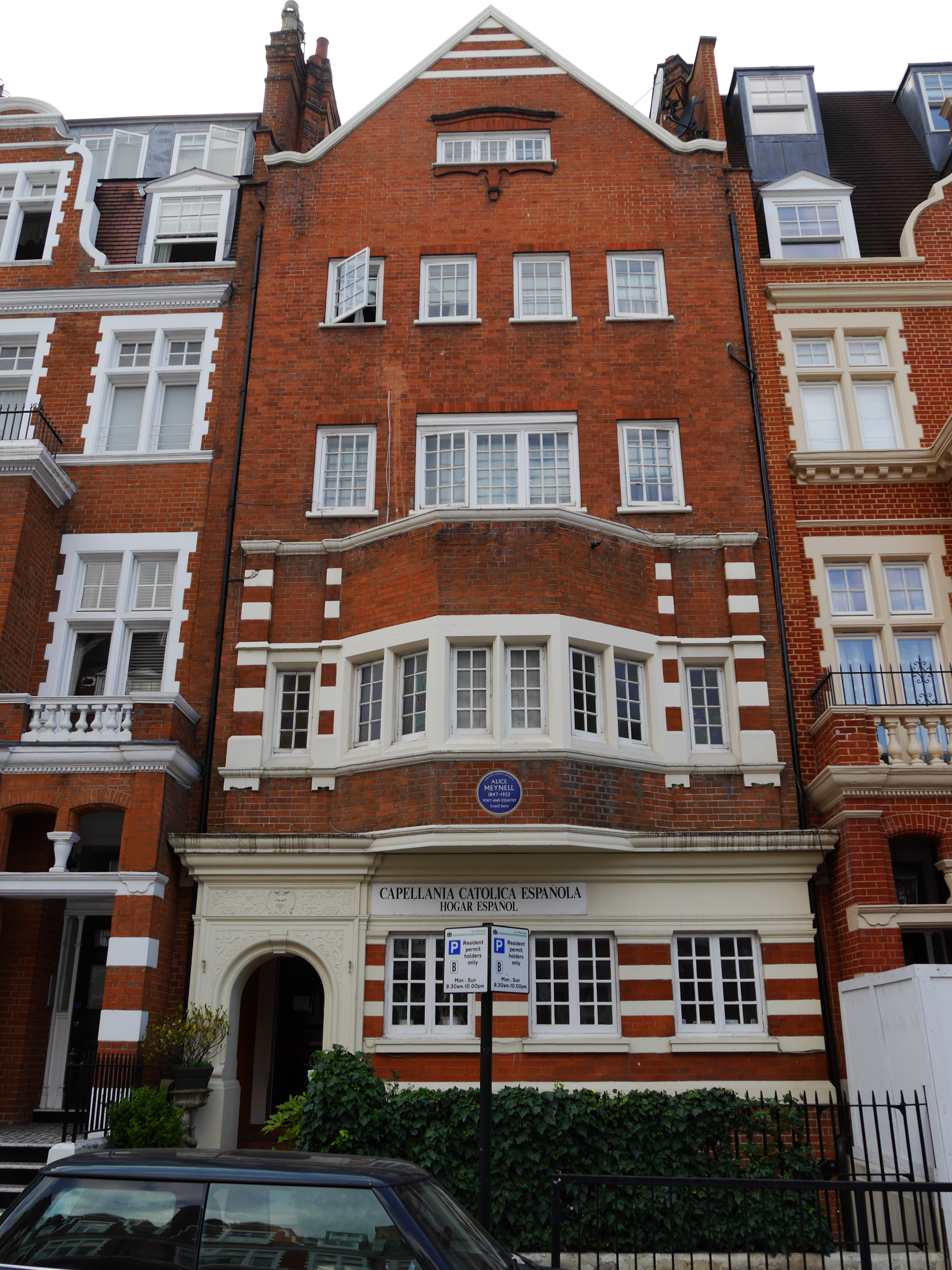
47 Palace Court

Alice Christiana Gertrude Meynell (/ˈmɛnəl/ MEN-uhl; née Thompson; 11 October 1847 – 27 November 1922) was a British writer, editor, critic, and suffragist, now remembered mainly as a poet. She was considered for the position of Poet Laureate of the United Kingdom twice, first in 1892 on the death of Alfred, Lord Tennyson, and later in 1913 on the death of Alfred Austin, but was never appointed to the position.

Meynell and her husband, Wilfrid Meynell, were the owners and editors of several Catholic publications and patrons of the poet Francis Thompson.

== Early life and family ==
Alice Christiana Gertrude Thompson was born in Barnes, London on 11 October 1847 to Thomas James and Christiana (née Weller) Thompson, a painter and concert pianist. The family moved around England, Switzerland, and France, but she was brought up mostly in Italy, where a daughter of her father's from his first marriage had settled. Her father was a friend of Charles Dickens, and Meynell suggests in her memoir that Dickens was also romantically interested in her mother, noting that he had said to Thomas Thompson, "Good God, what a madman I should seem if the incredible feeling I have conceived for that girl could be made plain to anyone!"

On her father's side, Meynell had Jamaican Creole ancestry and was a third cousin of Elizabeth Barret Browning.

Meynell suffered from ill health during her early life, and in 1868, during a bout of illness, converted to Roman Catholicism. During this time, she reportedly fell in love with the Jesuit Priest, Father Augustus Dignam, who had helped her in her conversion. Dignam is believed to have inspired Meynell's love poems "After Parting" and "Renouncement." By 1880, her entire family had also converted to Catholicism.

In 1876, Meynell met newspaper editor and fellow Catholic convert Wilfrid Meynell (1852-1948), who was five years her junior, and they married in 1877. The couple had eight children: Sebastian, Monica, Everard (1882–1926), Madeleine, Viola, Vivian (who died at three months), Olivia, and Francis. Viola Meynell (1885–1956) became a writer, known mainly for fiction, who later wrote a biography of her mother titled The Life of Alice Meynell (1932). Her youngest child Francis Meynell (1891–1975) became a poet and a printer who co-founded The Nonesuch Press.

== Career ==
=== Writing and publishing ===
In 1875, Meynell published Preludes, her first poetry collection, illustrated by her elder sister Lady Elizabeth Butler (1846–1933). The work was warmly praised by John Ruskin, who especially praised the sonnet "Renouncement" for its beauty and delicacy, though although it received little public notice otherwise.

After their marriage in 1877, Meynell and her husband became a proprietors and editors of various magazines, including The Pen, the Weekly Register, and Merry England, among others. Meynell was highly involved in the editorial work of these publications.

Meynell also continued to publish her own writing, including literary and art criticism, and wrote regularly for The World, The Spectator, The Magazine of Art, the Scots Observer (which became the National Observer, both edited by W. E. Henley), The Tablet, The Art Journal, the Pall Mall Gazette, and The Saturday Review. Her poems show her feminist concerns as well as her reactions to the events of World War I.

=== Patronage of Francis Thompson ===
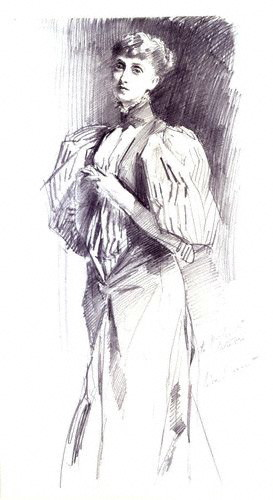
Meynell by John Singer Sargent, pencil, 1894

The poet Francis Thompson, who was homeless and suffering from an opium addiction, sent the couple a manuscript. His poems were first published in the Meynell's paper Merry England, and the couple became supporters of Thompson. His 1893 book Poems was published by the Meynells.

=== Relationships with other writers ===
Meynell and her husband had a wide social circle that included many notable writers of their time, including Jeannette Augustus Marks, Robert Browning and Elizabeth Barrett Browning, Frieda and D.H. Lawrence, Harriet Monroe, and Aubrey de Vere.

Meynell also had a deep friendship with Coventry Patmore, whose poetry she supported, that lasted several years. In 1893, Coventry gave Meynell the manuscript for The Angel in the House, his best-known work, as a token of their friendship. Eventually, Patmore became obsessively in love with Meynell, leading her to end their friendship. She wrote the article on Patmore for the Catholic Encyclopedia.

=== Artist's model ===
Meynell was also involved in the world of art. In 1894, she was drawn by John Singer Sargent, and in 1897 by William Rothenstein. She was also photographed by Sherril Schell in approximately 1911-1913, by E. O. Hoppé in 1914, and by Walter Stoneman in approximately 1916.

Sargent asked Meynell to write the introduction for a collection of his works, titled The Works of John S. Sargent, R.A., in 1903.

== Critical reception ==
In March 1923, a few months after Meynell's death, Jeanette Marks published a retrospective of Meynell's works in the North American Review. She criticized Meynell's "religiosity" and "deliberate and labored moral judgments," but praised Meynell's embrace of "the multitude," writing that:

To Alice Meynell the last curiosity was not of art but of life itself; it is the disparity between destiny and nature; the trivial transmission of a life that is nevertheless great, the vulgar experience of love that is none the less real, the "heroic virtue" of death committed to the keeping of us all; the gravity of mortality greater than that of immortality.

— Jeannette Marks, The Multitude: An Appreciation of Alice Meynell, The North American Review, Vol. 217, No. 808.

Also in 1923, Harriet Monroe wrote of Meynell's writing, "There is a crying need for a complete edition of Alice Meynell's verse and prose...Sometimes her quest of an austere beauty is carried too far toward preciosity, but often she attains without effort a severe clarity and precision which the rising generation will do well to study."

Meynell's work has continued to be praised and studied in the late twentieth and early twenty-first centuries, with contemporary scholars including Angela Leighton and Linda Austin having published articles on Meynell and her work.

== Activism ==
At the end of the 19th century, in conjunction with uprisings against the British (among them the Indians', the Zulus', the Boxer Rebellion, and the Muslim revolt led by Muhammad Ahmed in the Sudan), many European scholars, writers, and artists, began to question Europe's colonial imperialism. This led the Meynells and others in their circle to speak out for the oppressed. Alice Meynell was a vice-president of the Women Writers' Suffrage League, founded by Cicely Hamilton and active 1908–19.

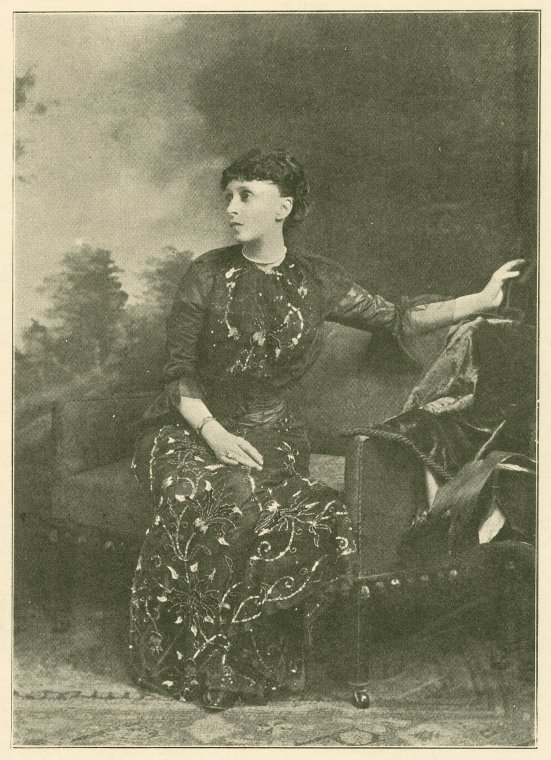
Meynell, unknown date

Meynell was one of the founders of the Catholic Women's Suffrage Society, which sought by peaceful means to achieve votes for women. Meynell established and wrote in the first edition of its newspaper The Catholic Suffragist, in 1915, "A Catholic suffragist woman is a graver suffragist on graver grounds and with weightier reasons than any other suffragist in England." Reports were shared from eleven branches (including a national congress in Wales and two societies in Scotland) and the editorial said "We dare to say that if the balance of power between men and women had been more equal the world over, we should not still be settling international disputes by swamping a continent in blood and turning Europe into a shambles."

Meynell wrote in The Tablet against Father Henry Day who preached against votes for women risking "bringing a revolution of the first magnitude". Meynell retorted "I say, most gravely, the vaster the magnitude of the revolution, the better." Where Day saw "danger" Meynell saw a "fortress of safety" for Catholic women, and she saw anti-suffrage rhetoric as "insolence".

== Death and legacy ==
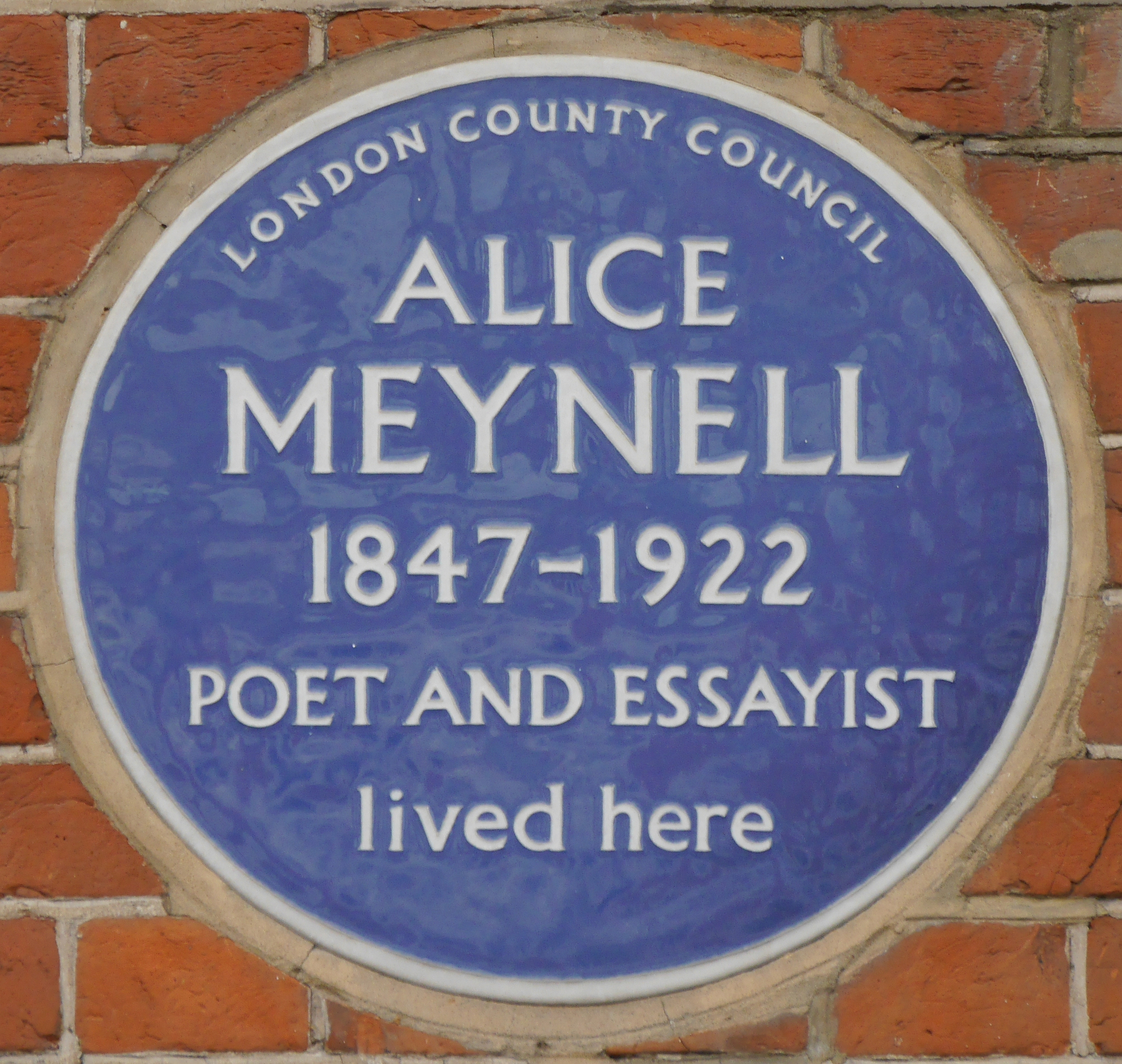
Alice Meynell blue plaque

Meynell was twice considered for the Poet Laureate of the United Kingdom, on the 1892 death of Alfred, Lord Tennyson and in 1913 to replace Alfred Austin. Elizabeth Barrett Browning, her third cousin, was the only other female potential laureate up to that time. Neither of these women were given the recognition of this status with the first and only female to hold the post, appointed by the monarch, being Carol Ann Duffy in 2009 -19.

After a series of illnesses, including migraine and depression, Meynell died on 27 November 1922 aged 75. A posthumous collection of her Last Poems was published by Burns and Oates, a year later. Meynell is buried at Kensal Green Catholic Cemetery in London. There is a London County Council commemorative blue plaque on the front wall of the property at 47 Palace Court, Bayswater, London, W2, where she and her husband once lived, whilst the 2023 play Modest covered Alice and her sister Elizabeth's life from 1874 to 1879.

Upon Meynell's death, Jeannette Marks wrote, "Like a child my mind has kept step with hers for many years, and like a child it still runs beside her, looking up, using her living words, following her thought. In the 'running' I have lost account of time; and now, they say, she is dead.... Tribulation, Immortality, the Multitude!"

== Selected works ==
- Preludes (1875) – poems
- The Rhythm of Life and Other Essays (1893)
- Poems by Francis Thompson (1893) – editor and producer
- Holman Hunt (1893)
- Selected Poems of Thomas Gordon Hake (1894) – editor
- The Colour of Life and Other Essays on Things Seen or Heard. London and Chicago: John Lane and Way and Williams. 1896 – via Internet Archive.
- The Poetry of Pathos & Delight by Coventry Patmore (1896) – editor
- The Flower of the Mind (1897) – anthology of English verse, editor, critic
- The Children. London and New York: John Lane. 1897 – via Internet Archive.
- The Spirit of Place and Other Essays. London and New York: John Lane. 1898 – via Internet Archive.
- London Impressions (1898)
- John Ruskin (1900)
- Later Poems (1902)
- The Work of John S. Sargent (1903)
- Ceres' Runaway and Other Essays (1909)
- Childhood (1913)
- Essays (1914)
- Hearts of Controversy (1917)
- The Second Person Singular and Other Essays (1921)
- The Poems of Alice Meynell: Complete Edition (Oxford University Press, 1940)
- The Poems of Alice Meynell: Centenary Edition (London: Hollis and Carter, 1947)
- Prose and Poetry (Jonathan Cape, 1947) – multiple editors, centenary publication with a biography and critical introduction by Vita Sackville-West

The latter publication is catalogued by one WorldCat library as Prose and Poetry of A. Meynell, 1847–1922 (OCLC 219753450) and by one as Alice Meynell: Prose and Poetry. Centenary Volume (OCLC 57050918), while another reports a 2007 facsimile edition Prose and Poetry, 1847–1922. There may be the title of a 1970 issue as Prose and Poetry, OCLC 630445893.

== See also ==
- History of feminism
- List of suffragists and suffragettes
- Women's suffrage in the United Kingdom
