= Sherril Schell =

American photographer (1877–1964)

Sherril Vance Schell (1877–1964) was an American architectural and portrait photographer active in London during the earliest decades of the twentieth century. Amongst the subjects he photographed was Rupert Brooke.
