= Linda Austin =

American psychiatrist (born 1951)

Linda Austin (born 1951) is an American psychiatrist. She is known for her work with mental health awareness via the media.

== Education and career ==
In 1976, Austin earned her MD from Duke University. Afterwards, she was a child psychiatry fellow at Georgetown University. There, she was also a clinical instructor for psychiatry. In 1986, she became a staff member at the Medical University of South Carolina. Three years later, she was named the assistant professor of psychiatry and director of the obsessive compulsive disorder program. In 1995, Austin received tenure and one year later became the associate dean for public education. She became a full-time psychiatry professor in 1999. Additionally, she is an American Psychological Association fellow.

After Hurricane Hugo, Austin used media sources such as television and radio for the purpose of public mental health education and changing the stigma that goes along with mental illness. She was featured in the American Psychological Association's film Depression: The Storm Within and in the same year she started her own mental health talk-show on NPR called What's on Your Mind?. She is also responsible for the updated webpage of the Medical University of South Carolina which includes over 900 award-winning podcasts. Aside from writing two books, one of which was featured on the Oprah Winfrey show, and hosting her own talk show, Austin practices psychiatry around 20 hours a week.
