= Francis Thompson =

English poet (1859–1907)

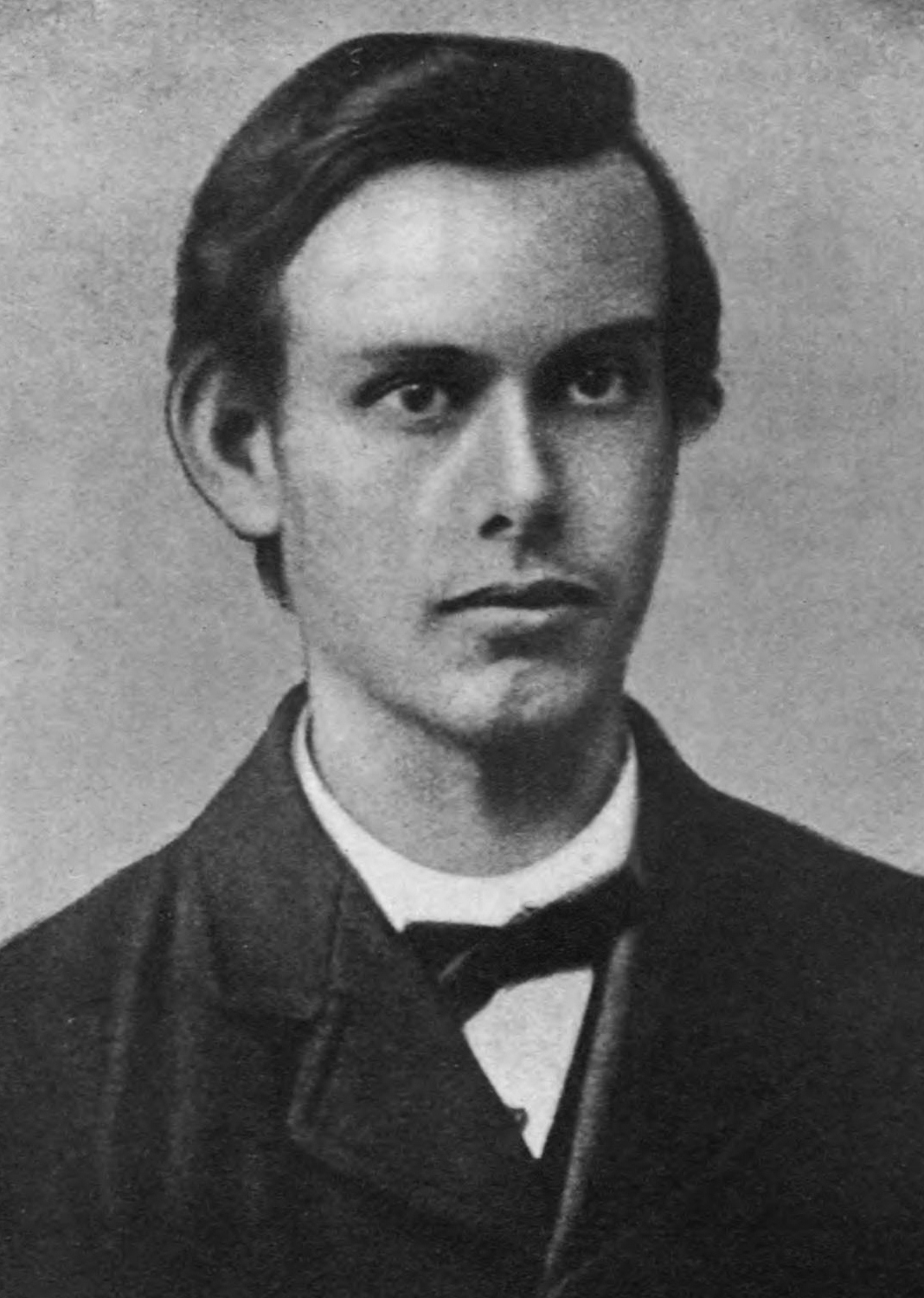
- Thompson in 1877
- Born: 16 December 1859; Preston, Lancashire, UK
- Died: 13 November 1907 (aged 47); St John's Wood, London, Middlesex, UK
- Resting place: St. Mary's Cemetery; Kensal Green
- Known for: Ethereal poetry Over 50 poems; essays Hound of Heaven

Francis Joseph Thompson (16 December 1859 – 13 November 1907) was an English poet and Catholic mystic. At the behest of his father, a doctor, he entered medical school at the age of 18, but at 26 left home to pursue his talent as a writer and poet. He spent three years on the streets of London, supporting himself with menial labour, becoming addicted to opium which he took to relieve a nervous problem.

In 1888 Wilfrid and Alice Meynell read his poetry and took the opium-addicted and homeless writer into their home for a time, later publishing his first volume, Poems, in 1893. In 1897, he began writing prose, drawing inspiration from life in the countryside, Wales and Storrington. His health, always fragile, continued to deteriorate and he died of tuberculosis in 1907. By that time he had published three books of poetry, along with other works and essays.

== Early life and study ==
Thompson was born in Winckley Street, Preston, Lancashire and baptized four days later in St Ignatius Church. His father, Charles, was a doctor who had converted to Roman Catholicism, following his brother Edward Healy Thompson, a friend of Cardinal Manning. Edward Healy, along with John Costall Thompson, Francis' uncles, were both authors. Francis had a brother who died in infancy, and three younger sisters.

At the age of eleven, Thompson was sent to Ushaw College, a Catholic seminary near Durham. A frail, delicate and extremely shy boy, he was described by his school fellows in 1870 as 'mooney' or abstracted but happy enough. He could be recognised from afar along an 'ambulacrum' or corridor by his habit of sidling sheepishly along the wall with the collar of his coat turned up. Most of his leisure time was spent in the college library where he was fond of history and poetry books. It was noticed that despite the distractions in the library of catapult fights and general mayhem, he had the ability to shut himself off and continue to be absorbed in his reading.

As he advanced up the college he became more skilled at writing and his friends remembered that out of twenty examination essays he obtained first place on sixteen occasions. Once he was punished with a beating for being the last boy to be ready for PE drill. He had no interest in Mathematics and, in his final exam, he came last. The only sport in which he developed an interest was Handball and it is said he achieved a standard above the average. He became a connoisseur of cricket though he rarely participated. In preparation for Ushaw College's centenary celebrations due to take place in 1908, Thompson, by then a celebrated poet, was approached to write a Jubilee Ode to mark the occasion. The poet was delighted that the assignment had been offered to him and it is said that he looked forward to seeing his 'College home' once more. His death, however, in 1907 meant that the commission was never carried out.

Thompson studied medicine for nearly eight years at Owens College, now the University of Manchester. While excelling in essay writing, he took no interest in his medical studies; he had a passion for poetry and for watching cricket matches. He never practised as a doctor, and tried to enlist as a soldier but was rejected for his slightness of stature. Then in 1885 he fled, penniless, to London, where he tried to make a living as a writer, in the meantime taking odd jobs – working for a bootmaker (John McMaster of Panton Street) and booksellers, and selling matches. During this time, he became addicted to opium, which he had first taken as medicine for ill health, having experienced a nervous breakdown while still in Manchester. He lived on the streets of Charing Cross and slept by the River Thames, with the homeless and other addicts. He was turned down by Oxford University, not because he was unqualified, but because of his addiction. Thompson contemplated suicide in his nadir of despair, but was saved from completing the action through a vision which he believed to be that of a youthful poet Thomas Chatterton, who had committed suicide over a century earlier. A prostitute, whose identity Thompson never revealed, befriended him and gave him lodgings. Thompson later described her in his poetry as his saviour.

== Writing career ==
In 1888, after three years on the streets, he was 'discovered' after sending his poetry to the magazine Merrie England. He was sought out by the magazine's editors, Wilfrid and Alice Meynell, who recognised the value of his work. They took him into their home and, concerned about his opium addiction which was at its height following his years on the streets, sent him to Our Lady of England Priory, Storrington, for a couple of years. He continued to take opium but in small doses at irregular intervals, to relieve nerve pain.

Francis wrote most of his poetry during this period from 1888 to 1897, after which he turned to writing prose. He struck up a good relationship with the Meynells who, parents and children, furnished inspiration for some of his poetry. They arranged for publication of his first book, Poems, in 1893. The book attracted the attention of sympathetic critics in the St James's Gazette and other newspapers, and Coventry Patmore wrote a eulogistic notice in the Fortnightly Review of January 1894. Francis' poem The Hound of Heaven was called by the Bishop of London "one of the most tremendous poems ever written," and by critics "the most wonderful lyric in the language," while The Times of London declared that people would still be learning it 200 years later. His verse continued to elicit high praise from critics right up to his last volume in 1897. His selected poems published in 1908 contains about 50 pieces in all. Notable among his prose works are an essay on Shelley, "The Life of St. Ignatius", and "Health and Holiness".

== Later life and death ==
Thompson moved around frequently, subsequently living near Pantasaph, Flintshire, in Wales and at Storrington. A lifetime of poverty, ill-health, and opium addiction had taken their toll on him, even though he found success in his last years.

Thompson died from tuberculosis at the age of 47, in the Hospital of St John and St Elizabeth, and is buried in St. Mary's Roman Catholic Cemetery in Kensal Green. His tomb bears the last line from a poem he wrote for his godson, a Meynell: Look for me in the nurseries of Heaven.

== Style and influence ==
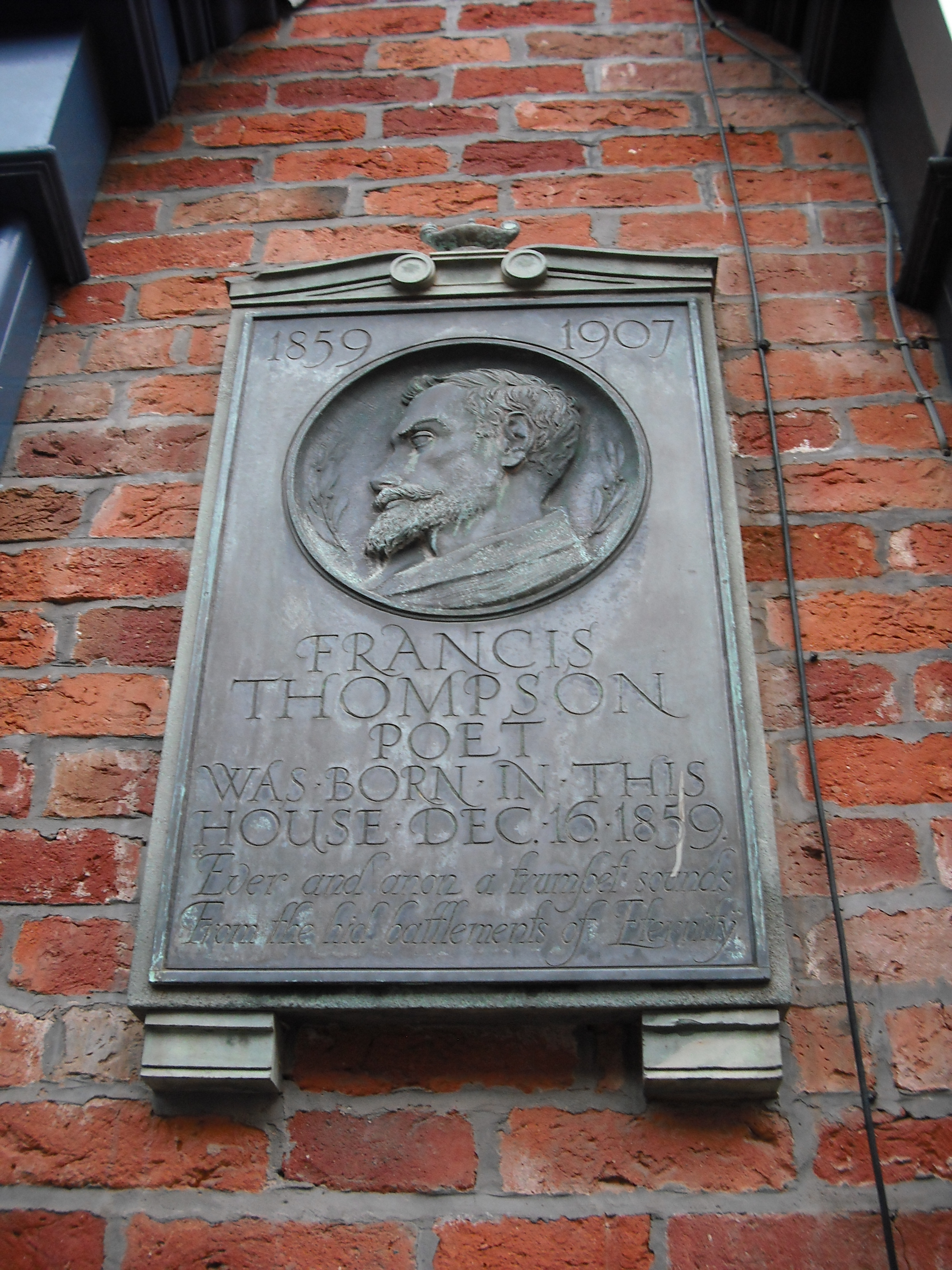
Memorial plaque to Thompson, Winckley Street, Preston

His most famous poem, The Hound of Heaven, describes the pursuit of the human person by God. The playwright Eugene O’Neill could recite it from memory.

In 2002, Katherine A. Powers, literary columnist for the Boston Globe, called Hound of Heaven "perhaps the most beloved and ubiquitously taught poem among American Catholics for over half a century," adding that Thompson's other poetry lost its popularity amidst anti-Modernism in the Catholic church during most of the twentieth century. However, she agrees that the dawning century is more akin to his spirit: "His medical training and life on the streets gave him a gritty view of reality and a social conscience, and his governing idea that God is immanent in all things and in all experience, so vexatious to both Victorians and the Vatican alike, no longer strikes an alien or heretical note."

G. K. Chesterton said shortly after his death that "with Francis Thompson we lost the greatest poetic energy since Browning." Among Thompson's devotees was the young J. R. R. Tolkien, who purchased a volume of Thompson's works in 1913–1914, and later said that it was an important influence on his own writing.

Phrases from his poetry have been lifted by others and made famous. The U.S. Supreme Court in Brown II used "with all deliberate speed" for the remedy sought in their famous decision on school desegregation. A phrase in "The Kingdom of God" is the source of the title of Han Suyin's novel A Many-Splendoured Thing. In addition, Thompson wrote the most famous cricket poem, the nostalgic "At Lord's". He also wrote The Poppy (1893), Sister Songs (1895), New Poems (1897), and a posthumously published essay, Shelley (1909).

Halliday Sutherland borrowed the second line of The Hound of Heaven for the title of his 1933 autobiographical best-seller The Arches of the Years. The American novelist Madeleine L'Engle used a line from the poem "The Mistress of Vision" as the title of her last Vicki Austin novel, Troubling a Star. The self-realized poet-yogi, Paramahansa Yogananda, was fond of quoting Thompson's The Hound of Heaven poem.

Bishop Fulton J. Sheen quoted lines from Ex Ore Infantium in his "The True Meaning of Christmas" episode in 1956.

In 2012, Chris Ward's biographical filmscript, Hound: Visions in the Life of the Victorian poet Francis Thompson was staged at the Riverside Studios, Hammersmith and following that the stage version was taken on a tour of London's churches including St Giles-in-the Fields and in St Olave's (City of London) in May 2014. A film of Hound based on the life of Francis Thompson has been made into feature film with a cast including Wayne Sleep, Toyah Willcox and Hazel O'Connor, and with Francis Thompson played by Daniel Hutchinson.

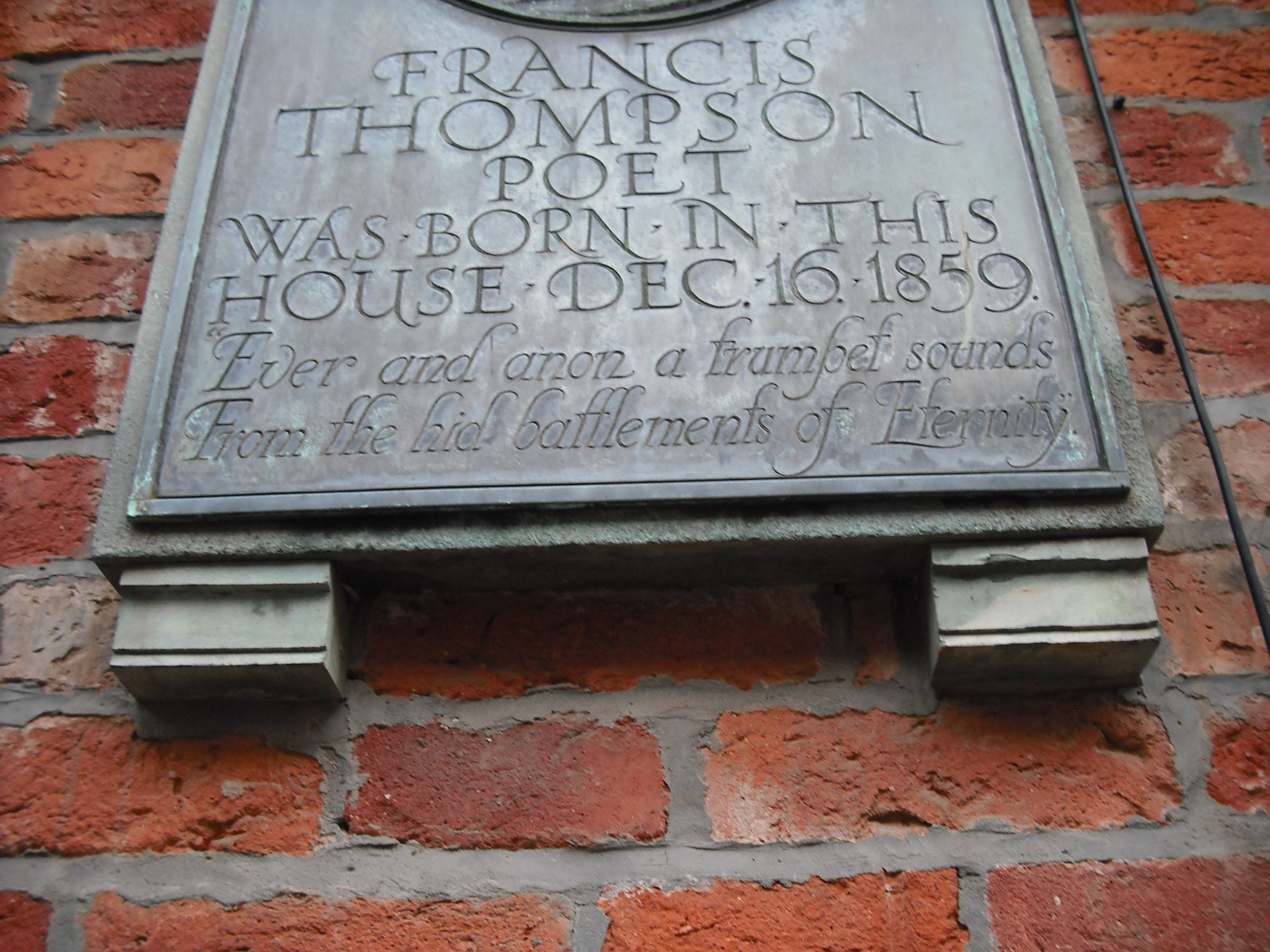
Inscription on memorial plaque

== Legacy ==
Thompson's birthplace, in Winckley Street, Preston, is marked by a memorial plaque. The inscription reads: "Francis Thompson poet was born in this house 16 Dec 1859. Ever and anon a trumpet sounds, From the hid battlements of eternity." The home in Ashton-under-Lyne where Thompson lived from 1864 to 1885 was also marked with a blue plaque. In 2014, however, the building collapsed.
