= Boquhapple =

Coordinates: 56.17°N 04.17°W

- Location within the Stirling council area
- OS grid reference: NN6500
- Council area: Stirling
- Country: Scotland
- Sovereign state: United Kingdom
- Police: Scotland
- Fire: Scottish
- Ambulance: Scottish

Boquhapple is an area in Stirling council area, Scotland near Thornhill.
