= 47 Palace Court =

Coordinates: 51.511599°N 0.192620°W

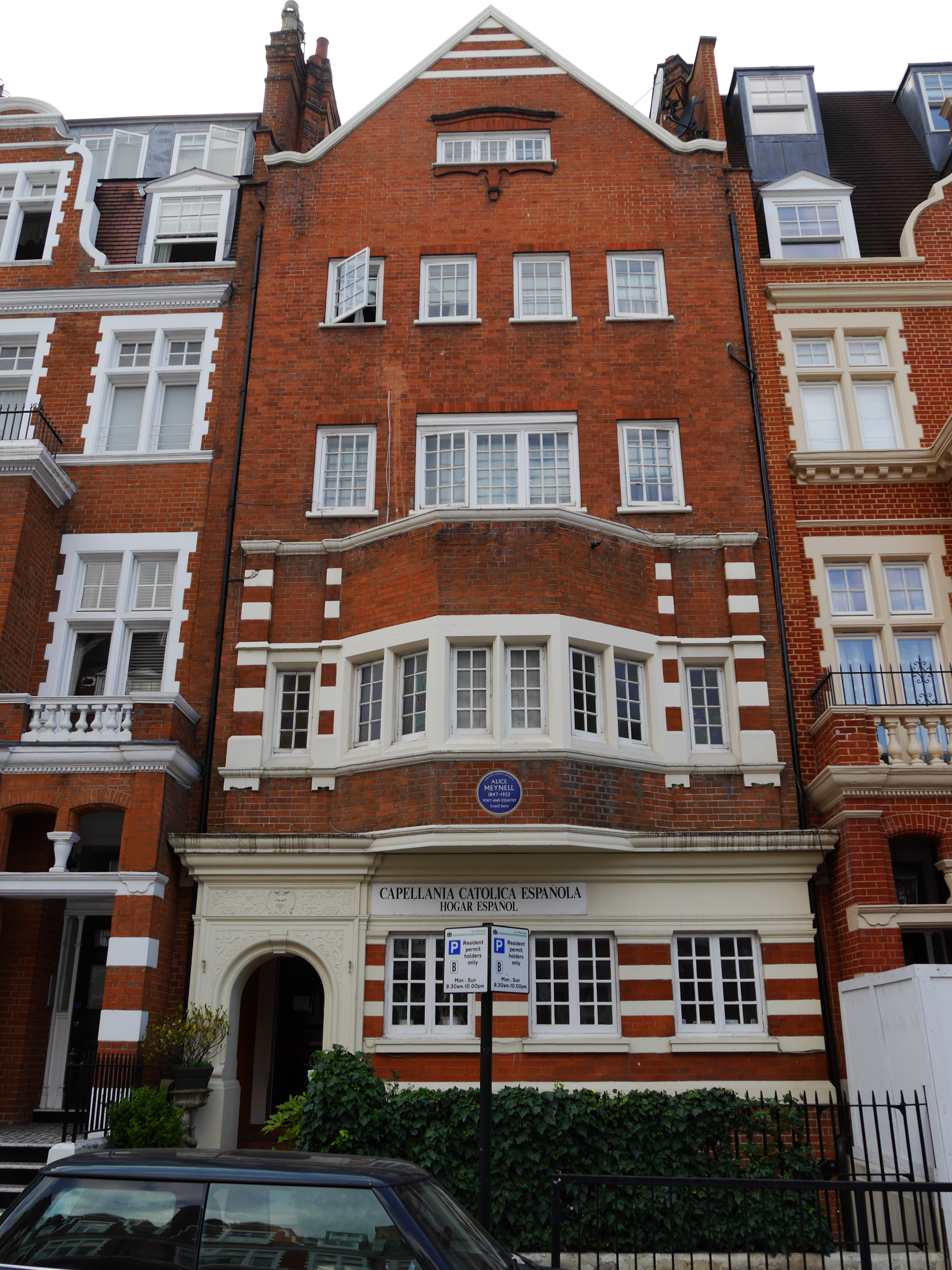
- Interactive map of the 47 Palace Court area

General information
- Status: Grade II listed
- Location: Palace Court, Bayswater, London, W2
- Completed: c. 1890

Design and construction
- Architect: Leonard Stokes

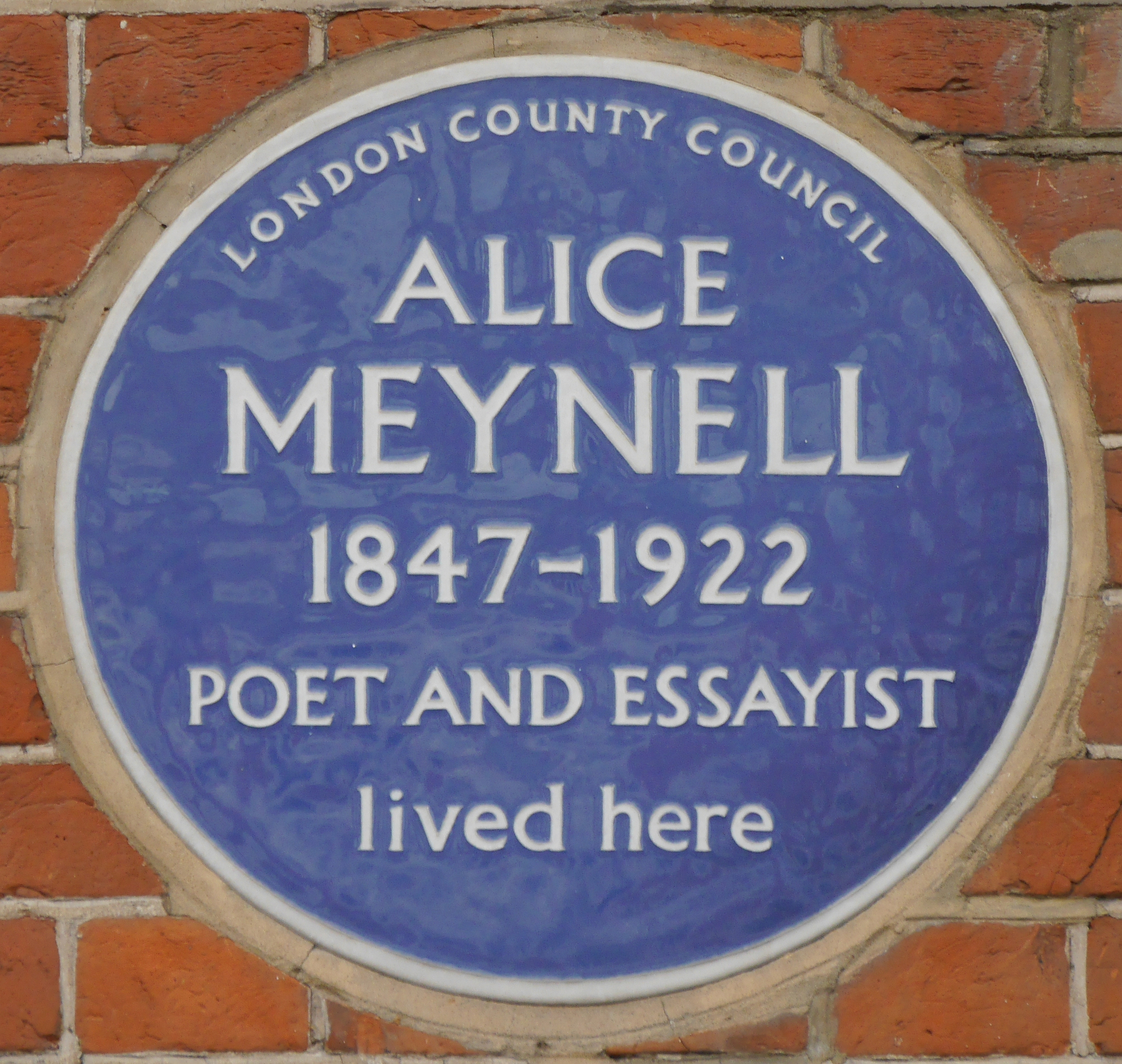
Alice Meynell blue plaque

47 Palace Court is a Grade II listed building at Palace Court, Bayswater, London, W2.

It was built in about 1890, and the architect was Leonard Stokes. There is a blue plaque to the writer Alice Meynell, who lived there.
