= Francis Meynell =

British poet and printer (1891–1975)

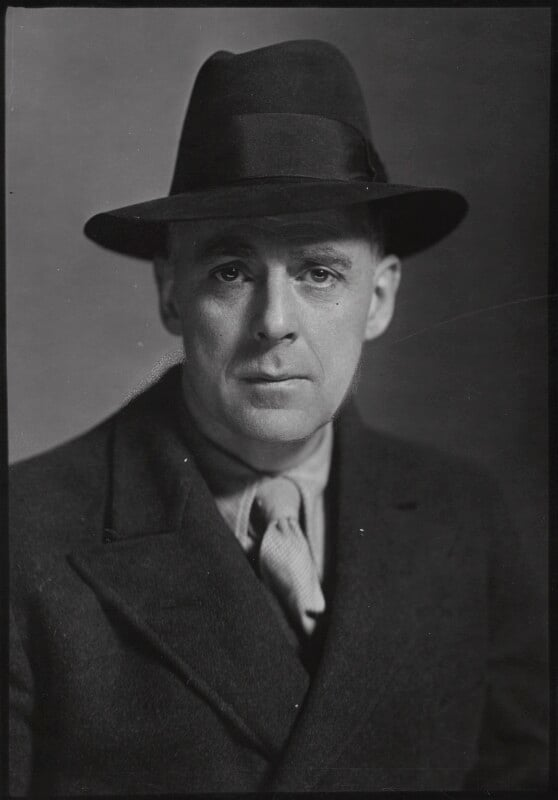
Meynell in 1946

Sir Francis Meredith Wilfrid Meynell (12 May 1891 – 10 July 1975) was a British poet and printer at The Nonesuch Press.

== Early career ==
He was the son of the journalist and publisher Wilfrid Meynell and the poet Alice Meynell, a suffragist and prominent Roman Catholic convert. After leaving Trinity College, Dublin, he joined his father at the publisher Burns & Oates. In 1913 he was brought in by George Lansbury to be business manager of the Daily Herald.

In 1912 he came to the notice of wealthy American, Mary Melissa Hoadley Dodge, who was domiciled in England. She knew Meynell's parents and had seen him speak in defence of activists of the suffragette movement in Queen's Hall. With her companion, Countess Muriel De La Warr, she provided support and funding for him in 1916 to start the Pelican Press and also helped with funding for the Daily Herald. In 1921 Meynell was editor of the weekly paper The Communist and became involved with a libel action that he lost. The award against him was £2000, and not being able to pay he filed for bankruptcy. Dodge and De La Warr came to his rescue but requested that their donation remain anonymous. Dodge became a godparent to Meynell's first child, Cynthia, in 1915.

== Conscientious objector ==
Meynell became liable for call-up for military service in 1916, and applied for exemption on the ground of being a conscientious objector. He appeared before a local tribunal in Marylebone in August 1916 and a county appeal tribunal in September. He was granted exemption from combatant service only, and surrendered himself to the civil police on 29 January 1917. Handed over by Westminster magistrates to the military authorities, he was held in the guard room at Hounslow Barracks and went on hunger strike. After three weeks in hospital, he was on 28 February 1917 discharged by the army as being unlikely to become an efficient soldier. He returned to his work at the Pelican Press and the Herald.

== Socialism ==
Meynell was also a socialist who supported the Republicans in the Spanish Civil War. His fusion of progressive politics and conservative aesthetic tastes, similar to those of William Morris caused some amusement amongst his friends; the Encyclopedia of Library and Information Science notes that "he once set a left-wing propaganda pamphlet in Cloister Old Face and surrounded it with a border of 17th-century fleurons."

== Family ==
Meynell married three times. His first wife was Hilda Peppercorn (1886-1962), daughter of painter Arthur Douglas Peppercorn. She was a concert pianist who performed using the name Hilda Saxe. She married Meynell in 1914 and they had one child, Cynthia. In 1925, following his divorce from Hilda, Meynell married Vera Rosalind Wynn Mendel (1895-1947). She was the daughter of Edith Wynne and William Mendel, a German born financier who had underwritten several stock market flotations in the late 19th century including Harrods and D. H. Evans. Vera and their mutual friend David Garnett provided the initial funding for the Nonesuch Press; she also helped in the early days with production and distribution. They had a son in 1930 (Benedict) and divorced in 1945. Vera took her own life on August 4, 1947.

Meynell was knighted in 1946 and in the same year married Alix Kilroy (1903–1999), a civil servant with the Board of Trade. They worked together during World War II on Utility Design, an austere and functional style. After the war they lived and farmed near Lavenham in Suffolk for many years. Their union was childless.

== Notes ==
Media offices
Preceded by Fred Willis	Editor of The Communist; 1921	Succeeded by Raymond Postgate
