= Wilfrid Meynell =

British newspaper publisher and editor (1852–1948)

Portrait by Walter Stoneman, c. 1916

Wilfrid Meynell CBE (/ˈmɛnəl/ MEN-uhl; 17 November 1852, Newcastle-upon-Tyne – 20 October 1948, Pulborough), who sometimes wrote under the pseudonym John Oldcastle, was a British newspaper publisher and editor.

Born of an old Yorkshire family on his father's side, he was related to a family of distinguished Quakers on his mother's side: his grandfather was Samuel Tuke, and James Hack Tuke and Daniel Hack Tuke were uncles. Henry Scott Tuke was a cousin.

In 1870, aged 18, Meynell became a convert to Roman Catholicism. He married the writer Alice Thompson in 1877. The pair's first effort at periodical publishing was The Pen, a short-lived critical monthly review. In 1881 he accepted Cardinal Manning's invitation to edit the Catholic Weekly Register, and continued to do so until 1899. Meynell later founded and edited (1883–94) the magazine Merry England, in which he discovered and sponsored the poet Francis Thompson.

In 1887 Wilfred was given the Westminster Press by Cardinal Manning. Wilfred was an urgent Catholic propagandist, and he promptly installed two new printing presses. At his suggestion the Cardinal baptized them. One of the presses was named 'The Cardinal', the other 'Lady Butler' after his sister-in-law, also a Roman Catholic, at that time famed as a painter. A main function of this press was the printing of The Weekly Register, founded in 1849 and also given to Wilfrid to own and edit.

Meynell wrote biographies of Manning, John Henry Newman and Pope Leo XIII. He contributed to a wide range of periodicals including the Contemporary Review, The Art Journal, The Magazine of Art, Athenaeum, the Academy, the Saturday Review, the Pall Mall Budget, Illustrated London News, the Daily Chronicle and The Nineteenth Century. During March 1906, The Windsor Magazine published an article entitled Politics - Second Series, co-authored by Meynell and Bertram Fletcher Robinson. This article was recently republished in a book entitled The World of Vanity Fair, edited by Paul Spiring.

By the 1920s, Meynell principally wrote for the Dublin Review and The Tablet.

Wilfrid and Alice Meynell had eight children, including the writer Viola Meynell, and the founder of The Nonesuch Press, Francis Meynell. After his wife's death in 1922, Meynell lived out the last 25 years of his life mainly at Humphrey's Homestead, Greatham, near Pulborough in West Sussex. He was appointed CBE in the 1943 Birthday Honours for services to literature.
