= Nonesuch Press =

English publishing company

Nonesuch Press was a private press founded in 1922 in London by Francis Meynell, his second wife Vera Mendel, and their mutual friend David Garnett, co-owner of Birrell & Garnett's bookshop in Soho's Gerrard Street, in the basement of which the press began.

== History ==
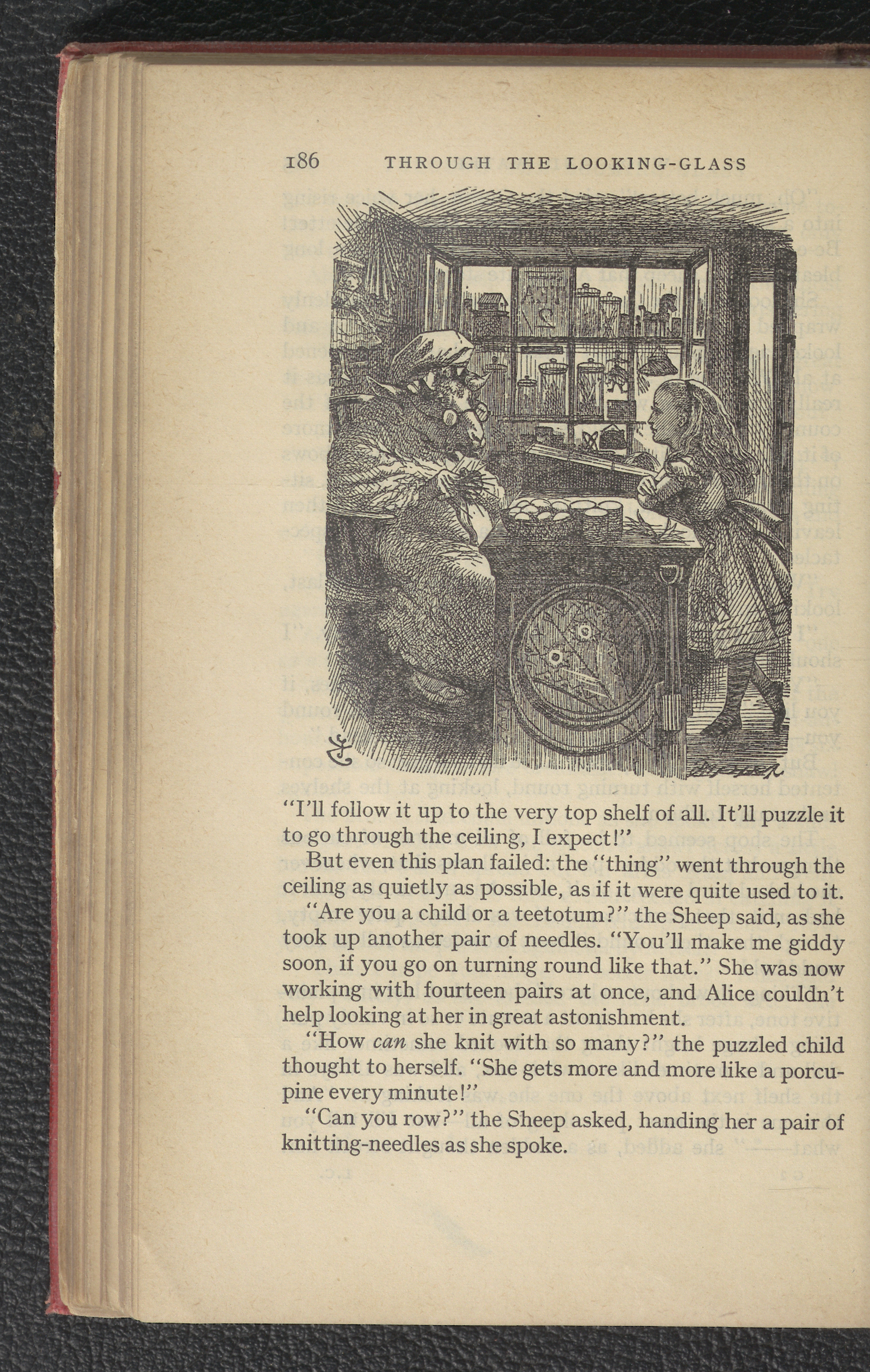
The Complete Works of Lewis Carroll Nonesuch Press, 1940, page 186

Nonesuch Press's first book, a volume of John Donne's Love Poems was issued in May 1923. In total, the press produced more than 140 books. The press was at its peak in the 1920s and 1930s, but continued operating until the mid-1960s. During the late 1930s and throughout the 1940s, Meynell ceded control of the press to George Macy, founder and owner of the Limited Editions Club. In the early 1950s, however, Meynell united with the owner of The Bodley Head, Max Reinhardt, and resumed control of Nonesuch. During the final years of the press's existence its remit was extended to include editions of classic children's books, such as E. Nesbit's The Treasure Seekers and Andrew Lang's fairy tales (these formed part of the press's Cygnet impression).

Nonesuch was unusual among private presses in that it used a small hand press to design books (an Albion press), but had them printed by commercial printers: for example, the Birmingham-based Kynoch Press. The purpose of this method was to produce book designs with the quality of a fine-press but available to a wider audience at lower prices. Meynell also wanted to demonstrate that "mechanical means could be made to serve fine ends." He believed that the production of exquisitely designed and produced books was not the preserve of the private press predicated upon the example established by William Morris's Kelmscott Press, which emphasized the primacy of the handpressed book.

Among the press's best-known editions were the collected works of William Congreve and William Wycherley, and translations of Miguel de Cervantes and Dante. A number of illustrated editions were also produced. Nonesuch's editions are prized by collectors; particularly rare and well-designed editions can sell for more than £1000 ($1774 U.S.).

In November 2005 Barnes & Noble issued reprints of the Nonesuch editions of Charles Dickens's novels, including Bleak House, Great Expectations and Hard Times, the Christmas Books, David Copperfield, Oliver Twist, and Nicholas Nickleby. A second set of reissues was released in November 2008, including A Tale of Two Cities, Martin Chuzzlewit and Little Dorrit.

Nonesuch editions of Dickens's novels have also been republished by Duckworth in the UK.

== Week-End books ==
The Week-End Book was a single volume anthology of general reading designed for a weekend away in a cottage or on a boat. It was first published by the Nonesuch Press in June 1924 and was its best selling title. The first half of the book contained an anthology of English poetry. Sales exceeded 100,000 copies within the first seven years. It continued to prove extremely popular and was reprinted in England 34 times up until 2006, sometime in facsimile. The 1938 edition was reissued in paperback by Penguin Books (nos. 129 & 130). Each Week-End Book contained works of fiction and non-fiction in small articles that could be read in moments of leisure, and included a wide range of subjects including poetry, religious works, songs, jokes, games and recipes, An American edition was added later.

It was designed for a middle brow reader who wanted a wide range of cultural topics but never to go in too deep. Virginia Woolf once commented about the books, "The Hogarth Press may not make any money but at least we did not publish The Week-End Book."
