= Burbidge =

Burbidge is a surname. Notable people with the surname include:

- Arthur Burbidge (c. 1836–1890), English cricketer
- David Burbidge (born 1943), British aristocrat
- Eileen Burbidge (born 1971), American-British venture capitalist
- Frederick Burbidge (cricketer) (1832–1892), English cricketer
- Frederick William Thomas Burbidge (1847–1905), English explorer and botanist
- Geoffrey Burbidge (1925–2010), English astronomy professor
- George Burbidge (1847–1908), Canadian lawyer, judge and author
- John Burbidge (1718–1812), English soldier, land owner, judge and political figure in Nova Scotia
- John W. Burbidge (1936–2023), Canadian professor of philosophy
- Leslie William Burbidge (1891–??), English World War I flying ace
- Margaret Burbidge (1919–2020), British-born American astrophysicist
- Maurice "Moss" Burbidge (1896–1977), pioneering Canadian aviator
- Michael Francis Burbidge (born 1957), American Roman Catholic Bishop
- Nancy Tyson Burbidge (1912–1977), Australian systemic botanist
- Pauline Burbidge (born 1950), British textile artist, designer, and quiltmaker
- Richard Burbidge (1847–1917), English merchant, 1st Baronet Burbidge

== See also ==
- 5490 Burbidge, an asteroid
- Burbidge baronets, a title in Great Britain
- Burridge (disambiguation)
