= Charles Harrod =

Charles Harrod may refer to:

- Charles Henry Harrod (1799–1885), English businessman who founded Harrods
- Charles Digby Harrod (1841–1905), his son, English businessman
