= Burbage =

Burbage may refer to:

== People ==
- Burbage (surname)

== Places in England ==
- Burbage, Derbyshire, a village
- Burbage, Leicestershire, a village and civil parish
- Burbage, Wiltshire, a village and civil parish

== See also ==
- Burbage Primary School, London Borough of Hackney
- Burbage Brook, river in Derbyshire and Sheffield, England
- Burbidge (surname list)
