= Beyfus =

Beyfus is a surname. Notable people with this surname include:

- Drusilla Beyfus (1927–2026), English journalist and etiquette writer
- Gilbert Beyfus (1885–1960), English barrister
- Solomon Beyfus (1820–1893), English trader

== See also ==
- Hermann Beyfuss (also Beyfus; 1857–1898), a painter from Austria-Hungary
- Bruce F. Beilfuss (1915–1986), an American lawyer and jurist
