= Sir Alfred Newton, 1st Baronet =

British businessman (1845–1921)

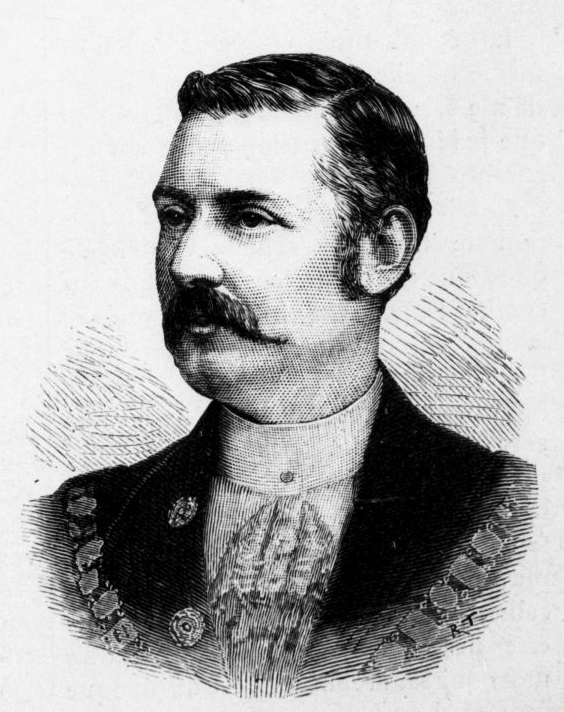
Newton, as Sheriff of London (1889)

Sir Alfred James Newton, 1st Baronet (18 November 1845 – 20 June 1921) was a British businessman. He was involved with the stock market flotation of several large privately owned retail stores, including Harrods in 1889 and D H Evans in 1894. He became Lord Mayor of London in 1900 and helped establish the City of London Imperial Volunteers who fought in the Second Boer War in South Africa. Mystery surrounds his death in 1921 from strychnine poisoning.

== Early life ==
Newton was born at Hull in 1845 to George Beeforth Newton of Kottington (1810–1889) and Helen Rowe (1813–1893). His father was connected with shipping and the holder of a Masters Certificate; his grandfather had been involved with the whale fisheries industry. His parents were married in Liverpool in 1834 and had four daughters and three sons. Alfred Newton was their sixth child and youngest son.

Principia supporting the troops in Egypt

In 1865, Newton was a grain and seed broker in High Street, Hull. In the 1870s he was a yeast merchant in Burton-on-Trent with his father. Later he was in partnership with his brothers, William and George Beeforth Newton Jr., in a chandlery and shipping business called Newton Brothers of Burton on Trent and Hull. In 1874, they purchased a diving cutter and specialised in salvage, raising or breaking-up sunken ships that were a danger to navigation. This sometimes involved the use of explosives, and there was at least one fatality when a diver working for them drowned in 1875. They expanded their fleet of ships, commissioning the 310 ft steamer Principia in 1881 for the India trade. In 1882 the British Government leased this ship, with others that they owned, to transport troops and materiel to the conflict in Egypt. This same year the partners opened a head office in the City of London at 19 Billiter Street.

== New business interests ==
When his brother William died in 1886 aged 48, Newton parted with the shipping business. The partnership continued between his surviving brother George Beeforth Jr., his father, and the manager William Holiday. When the father died in 1889 the firm was renamed Newton Brothers and Holiday.

Following his withdrawal from the family business Newton became involved with the stock market flotation of several private companies. In 1886, he was a director of the Norfolk and Suffolk Brewing Company (Colchester Brewing Company), in 1887 director of the New Zealand Gold Extraction Company (Newberry Vautin Process) Ltd., and in 1888 the chairman of the Gaiety Theatre. He was chairman of The President Land and Exploration Company in 1889 and the same year appointed chairman of the board of Harrods Store, raising capital to buy the store from Charles Digby Harrod for £100,000. In the next decade several other departmental stores followed suit with his involvement including D. H. Evans (chairman), J. R. Roberts’ Stores (chairman), Crisp and Company of Holloway (director) and Paquin of Paris (director). Whilst chairman of Harrods he also oversaw the purchase of the departmental stores Dickins & Jones (1914) and Swan and Edgar (1920).

== Civic duty and controversy ==
During the 1890s he held posts as the master of three City of London Livery Companies. These were the Worshipful Company of Framework Knitters (1895–96), the Worshipful Company of Girdlers (1898-1900) and Worshipful Company of Fan Makers in 1899. In 1889 he was nominated and appointed the Sheriff of London and Middlesex; in the following year he became Alderman of the Ward of Bassishaw, a Lieutenant of the City of London and in 1899 he became the Lord Mayor of London. However, at the same time he came under scrutiny for a share flotation that he had been involved with concerning another store called Grice and Son of Clapham. This business had been purchased by Industrial Contract Corporation (Limited) for the sum of £16,000 in about 1897, and sold to another company with the same directors called the Auxiliary Stores for £48,000 (equivalent to £5,101,000 in 2025). The directors for both these companies were Newton, Richard Burbidge, who was the general manager of Harrods, James Bailey, who was a director of Harrods and James Jackson, a director of J. R. Roberts' Stores. A merchant and banker named William Mendel was also a key player, holding the founders' shares that gave him a controlling interest. (Note: Mendel described himself as a capitalist and was a central figure in many of the stock market flotations that Newton was involved with.)

Attempts were made by these directors to wind-up the first company, but the shareholders were unhappy with the terms they were offered. After threats of court action an agreement was reached between the parties. This was not the end of the story; the Lord Chief Justice, on being officially introduced to the newly appointed Lord Mayor Newton, publicly expressed his concern about his involvement with the Industrial Contract Corporation. In order to allow a public examination of the matter, Newton instigated formal winding up proceedings to be heard before a Chancery judge. In his summary at the end of the investigation, the judge said that the memorandum of the articles of association of the company were nothing short of a scandal. Shareholders had not been made aware of the profit being taken by the directors and the holder of founders' shares had the same rights of voting as the total number of shareholders.

== City of London Imperial Volunteers ==
In October 1899 hostilities broke out in South Africa between the British and the South African Republic and the Orange Free State. In December a proposal was put forward that the City of London should sponsor a volunteer troop of soldiers to take part in the conflict. Lord Mayor Newton was approached by Colonel Boxall on the subject and within days he had reached agreement with various City livery companies, bankers, merchants and the Court of Common Council to support and fund the venture. The troop was called the City of London Imperial Volunteers - CIV for short. The first volunteers were registered at the Guildhall on 1 January 1900 and this contingent left for South Africa on 13 January from Southampton. What made this speeding mobilisation possible was that the recruits were all members of the Metropolitan Volunteer Corp, part-time soldiers, recommended for their abilities by their respective commanding officers. Every member of the corp received the freedom of the City of London.

== Baronetcy ==
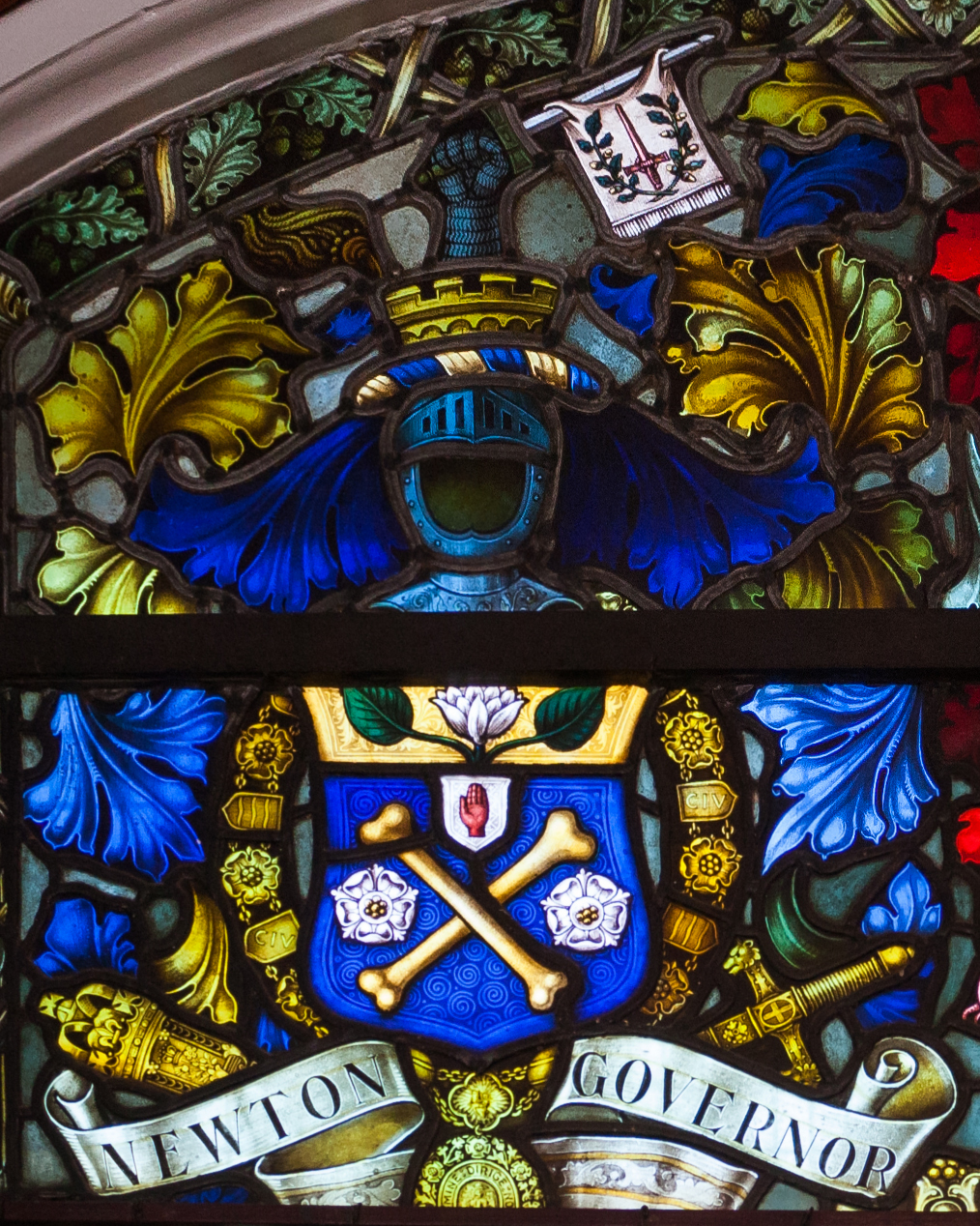
Coat of arms of Sir Alfred James Newton as Governor of the Irish Society in a memorial window of the Irish Society, erected at its tercentenary 1613–1913 in the Coleraine Town Hall. Blazon: Azure, two shin-bones in saltire, the sinister surmounted of the dexter or, between as many roses in fesse argent, barbed and seeded proper, on a chief of the second a lotus-flower leaved and slipped of the last.

In May 1900 Queen Victoria visited the City of London and afterwards conferred a Baronetcy on Newton. He became 1st Baronet Newton, of The Wood, Sydenham Hill, Lewisham, Kent and Kottingham House, Burton-on-Trent, co. Stafford. In 1906 he was made Governor of The Honourable The Irish Society and continued in this role until 1921. In his role as the Lord Mayor of London, Newton was asked to nominate individuals to fill vacancies in the Lieutenancy of The City of London. Two of those he put forward were his brother-in-law, Alfred Durant Watson, and his uncle, George Lord Beeforth, who had been a publisher in London (Fairless & Beeforth), a co-founder of the Doré Gallery and in 1894 the Mayor of Scarborough, Yorkshire.

== Sylvia Pankhurst ==
Newton was a magistrate by virtue of being an Alderman of the City of London. He sat on the bench of the courts in the Guildhall and Mansion House. It was there on 20 October 1920 that Sylvia Pankhurst, a suffragette and editor of the newspaper The Workers Dreadnought, appeared before him accused of sedition. This was due to four articles published in her paper. She defended herself but was found guilty and sentenced by Newton to six months in the second division.

== Death ==
Newton died at Harrods in 1921. He had travelled from home in an automobile with his wife on their way to the store. When they arrived, Newton had a seizure and fell back into his seat next to his wife. A doctor was called but Newton had died. It later transpired that there was a high dosage of strychnine in his indigestion medicine, enough to kill a large number of people. The medicine had been made up on prescription by the Harrods pharmacist. At the inquest she described her working methods and precautions with poison, saying that it would not have been possible for Newton's medication to have become contaminated with strychnine in the pharmacy. Newton had complained that this new bottle of medicine had tasted very bitter so it seems unlikely that it was self-administered. The doctor who conducted the post-mortem said at the inquest that Newton's heart was in a poor condition and he would not have lived much longer, although the strychnine had contributed to the death. The jury returned a verdict that death was due to heart failure.

== Family ==
Newton married Elizabeth (Lily) Jane Watson (1856-1945), the daughter of Sarah and Joseph Watson who was a yeast merchant living in Mitcham, Surrey. Lily and Alfred Newton had two children, Sir Harry Kottingham Newton, 2nd Baronet (1875-1951) and Muriel Prudhoe Newton (1878-1975), who married in 1902 George Parsons. His great-grandson, the Rev. Sir George Peter Howgill Newton, the 4th baronet (born 1962), is the vicar of Holy Trinity church in Aldershot.

== Notes ==
Civic offices
Preceded by Sir John Voce Moore	Lord Mayor of London; 1899–1900	Succeeded by Sir Frank Green
Baronetage of the United Kingdom
New creation	Baronet (of The Wood and Kottingham House); 1900–1921	Succeeded by Harry Newton
