= John Voce Moore =

English businessman and Lord Mayor of London

Sir John Voce Moore
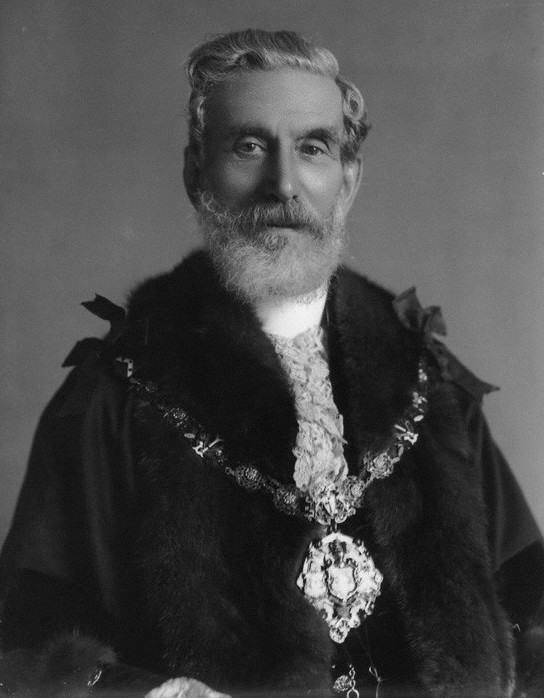
- Born: 5 February 1826; Stockport, Cheshire, England
- Died: 11 February 1904 (aged 78); St Giles, London, England
- Resting place: Highgate Cemetery
- Occupation: Businessman
- Known for: Lord Mayor of London

Sir John Voce Moore (5 February 1826 – 11 February 1904) was an English businessman and Lord Mayor of London.

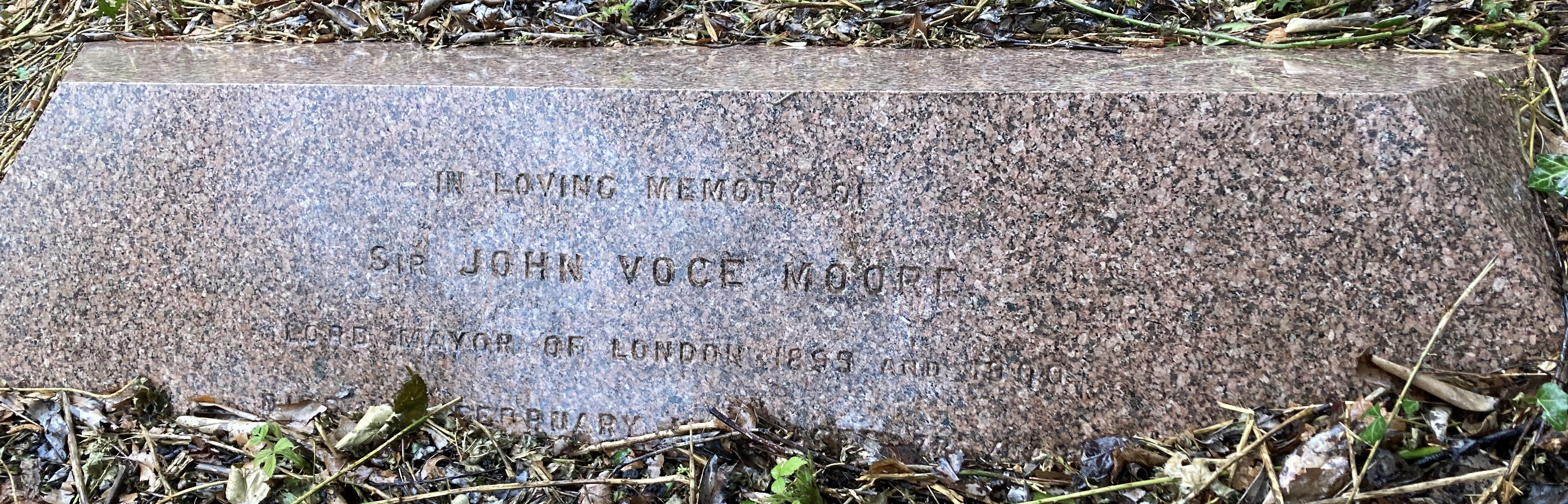
Grave of Sir John Voce Moore in Highgate Cemetery (west side)

== Biography ==
Moore was born in Stockport in 1826, the son of James and Martha Moore.

He founded a tea trading company at age 22 and retired as the senior partner of Moore Brothers Tea Merchants. He was a member of the Loriners Company.

Moore was a member of the Court of Common Council from 1870 to 1889, and Alderman for Candlewick ward from 1889 to July 1902, when he resigned due to ill-health. He was appointed Sheriff of the City of London for 1894, served as Deputy Lieutenant for Kent the same year, and elected Lord Mayor of London for 1898. In that capacity he opened the Transvaal War Fund and the Refugees Fund. In 1894 Moore and the other Sheriff, Joseph Dimsdale, were both knighted in commemoration of the opening of the Tower Bridge and the birth of an heir to the throne.

Moore died 11 Feb 1904 and is buried on the west side of Highgate Cemetery.

== Family ==
Moore married in Cambridge in 1847 Eliza (she died 1890). Their sons took over the business. A daughter was married to J. King Farlow, who was a representative of Candlewick in the Court of Common Council 1894–1902.

Civic offices
Preceded by Sir Horatio Davies	Lord Mayor of London; 1898 – 1899	Succeeded by Sir Alfred Newton, Bt
