= Burridge (disambiguation) =

Burridge is a village in the Borough of Fareham, southern Hampshire, England.

Burridge may also refer to:

- Burridge (surname)
- Burbidge baronets, a title in the Baronetage of the United Kingdom
- Burridge Fort, an Iron Age hilltop fortification north-east of Barnstaple, Devon, England

== See also ==
- Burr (surname)
- Burr Ridge, Illinois
