= Frederick Burbidge =

Frederick Burbidge may refer to:

- Frederick William Burbidge (1847–1905), British explorer
- Frederick Burbidge (cricketer) (1832–1892), English cricketer
