= Edgar Israel Cohen =

British sponge & cigar merchant (1853-1933)

Edgar Israel Cohen (1853–1933) was a British sponge and cigar merchant working in London, England, who later became involved with retail, entertainment, and popularised the motorised London taxicab in 1906. He became associated with the flotation of several family owned businesses of the period including Harrods department store. He was a close friend of Lillie Langtry and provided funding for her theatrical ventures in 1900.

== Sponge merchant ==
Cohen was born in Whitechapel, London in 1853, the son of Israel and Rachael Cohen. His father was a dealer in sponges, as was his grandfather, who came to England from the Netherlands. Cohen was the eldest son from a large family with fifteen siblings. (Note: In her memoirs, his daughter, Hilda says there were 15 siblings; checks on the census records of the period have provided evidence of at least 13.) He was known as Emmanuel when young, but later used the first name Edgar. He became a sponge merchant working for I & M Cohen, a business owned by his father and his uncle, Moss Cohen. Edgar remained with the business as a director after both the senior partners died in 1894. In 1903 the firm was amalgamated with Cresswell Brothers and Schmitz, Henry Marks & Sons, becoming the public company, International Sponge Importers Limited.

== Retail industry ==
In the 1880s, Edgar Cohen had a chance meeting and conversation with a gentleman during a journey in London. They exchanged cards and later met and discussed business. The gentleman was Charles Digby Harrod who owned a small shop in Brompton Road. After a fire in his shop and the subsequent rebuild, Cohen suggested to him that he could sell the business via a stock market flotation. This was agreed and in 1889 a prospectus was published indicating that Mr C. D. Harrod was leaving the business on health grounds and a limited company was being formed to buy his holdings for £100,000. Cohen joined the board of the new company (Harrod's Stores, Limited) and received a large remuneration from Charles Harrod in gratitude. He remained on the board for many years, becoming a director of Harrods Buenos Aires when it was created in 1914, and involved with the takeover of Dickins & Jones in 1914 and Swan & Edgar in 1920.

Cohen was a director of several other companies in the retail and clothing sector including D. H. Evans. (Note: No objections were raised about him being a director on the board of rival companies. Today this would probably be considered a conflict of interests.) He was chairman of the departmental store Crisp & Co. Ltd., in Seven Sisters and the milliners, Louise & Co. His two sons-in-law, American, Leopold D Ginsburg and milliner Frank Reginald Brighten, were involved in the development of this company. In 1903 Maison Lewis of Paris was purchased and in 1910 the French milliner Maison Virot was absorbed into the business. For his part in these negotiations, the shareholders voted Cohen a 3000 guineas bonus and appointed him chairman for life.

== The General Motor Cab Co. Ltd ==
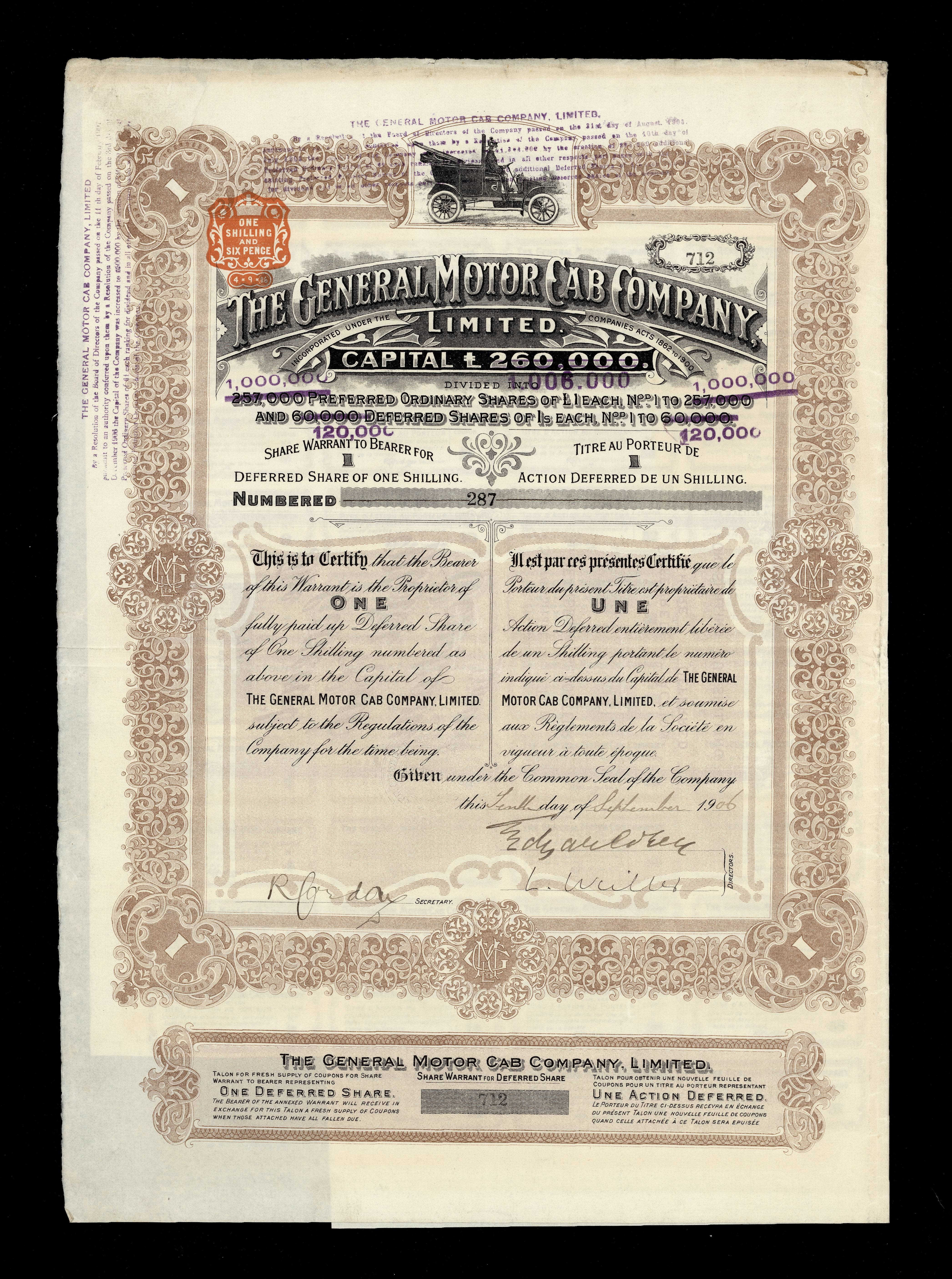
Share of the General Motor Cab Company Ltd., issued 10 september 1906

In 1907 Cohen became involved with The General Motor Cab Co., a business established to create a large fleet of taxis in London based on the Paris system. Attempts had previously been made to introduce cabs but with limited success. Initially there were 500 vehicles (Renaults), with metering equipment purchased from France, and later there were plans to extend the number in the fleet to over 3000. Cohen was the managing director for the business, responsible for the purchase of the vehicles, spares, garaging, training and negotiations with the authorities in London and with the drivers.

== Theatre ==
The theatre played a big part in Cohen's life and in particular he loved opera. There were several family connections with the stage; his brother-in-law, Count Max Hollender, was the chairman of the Palace Theatre, London, and his nephew, Alfred Butt, was an impresario with controlling interests in several theatres. His son-in-law, Frank Brighten, provided costumes for London productions and his daughters, Hilda and Madeline (Maddie), were both involved with the theatre.

He also provided funding for Lillie Langtry when she took the lease and refurbished the Imperial Theatre in 1900.

Cohen's house parties were lavish affairs and many of the celebrities of the period from the world of entertainment attended such as Enrico Caruso, Leslie Stuart, Auguste van Biene, Lewis Waller and many others. Fred and Adele Astaire once danced at the house and Paul Whiteman’s band performed.

== Horse racing and gambling ==
Two of Cohen's passions were gambling and horse racing. His horses were in training with H. Eugene Leigh in France and after about 1906 Fred Darling in England, who was just at the beginning of his training career. He also shared a racing stud with Lillie Langtry and persuaded her to change from her trainer Donohue to Fred Darling in 1907.

Cohen's son, Stanley, inherited his love of gambling but got into debt and embezzled money from the International Sponge Importers Limited, where he had been a director and manager for 26 years. In 1935 he was sentenced to 12 months in prison for the offence.

== Quick Lunch Company ==
In 1903 Cohen opened an American style quick lunch restaurant on the Strand. However, the business failed and Cohen was forced to wind up the operation in January 1905 and appoint a liquidator.

== 8 Clarges Street ==
Cohen worked from his London offices at 8 Clarges Street in London. His visitors included business associates, jockeys, trainers, people seeking financial support, entertainers asking for introductions and inventors looking for funding. One such was a Frenchman called Lemoine who claimed to have invented a process for making diamonds. In 1901 Cohen advanced several hundred pounds to obtain an interest in the scheme, but abandoned this after further investigation. However, Lemoine continued his quest for money and persuaded Sir Julius Wernher of De Beers to part with several thousands pounds. Lemoine was later arrested and put on trial. During the trial Cohen published details of the dealing he had with Lemoine and also published the formula.

== Family ==
Cohen married Ada Beyfus in 1876. She was the daughter of Charlotte Abrahams and Solomon Beyfus, who was an East End trader and bill discounter living in Bedford Square, London. When they first married, Cohen and Ada took a neighbouring house in Bedford Square but in about 1891 moved to 4 Hall Road, St John's Wood. Sometime after 1918 Cohen moved to 10 Cambridge Gate, Regents Park.

Ada and Edgar Cohen had six children, although the first died very young. There were four daughters: Constance (Connie), Hilda, Madeleine (Maddie), Ida and a son, Stephen. Cohen's business success seemed to fail him in later years. His wife died in 1916 and he died at the age of 80 on 29 January 1933. His probate put his final wealth at £5. He was buried in the Willesden Jewish Cemetery.

== Lillie Langtry ==
Cohen had a close relationship with Lillie Langtry, they shared the love of horseracing and the theatre where Cohen provided financial backing for her. Cohen's daughter, Hilda Brighten, published a book called No Bridge to Yesterday about her early family life. One passage in the book relates to Lillie Langtry. She wrote that her father admired and adored Langtry and regarded her as "the most exquisitely lovely woman he had ever met".
