= Gilbert Beyfus =

English barrister (1885–1960)

Gilbert Hugh Beyfus (1885–1960) was an English barrister whose clients included Liberace, John Aspinall and Aneurin Bevan. He was called to the bar in 1908, took silk in 1933 and continued working until his death in 1960. Many of his notable cases were related to divorce, libel, slander and interpretation of the UK gambling laws.

== Early years ==
Family of Gilbert Hugh Beyfus

Gotz Philip Beyfus (1788-1845) m Cippy ? (1784-1872)	Henry Abrahams (1780-1844) m Esther Isaacs (1774-1858)
Philip Beyfus (1818-1894)	Eliza Beyfus (1826-1867)	Solomon Beyfus (1820-1893)	married 1841	Charlotte Abrahams (1813-1887)
Julia Beyfus (1843-1896) m 1864; Albert Isaac Boss (1838-1912)	Henry Beyfus (1845–1889) m 1867; Jane Moss (1849-1921)	Gertrude Beyfus (1846–1913) m 1868; Michael John Garcia (1840-1923)	Philip Beyfus (1848–1941) m 1880; Ellah Ann Jacobs (1857-1931)	Alfred Beyfus (1851–1914) m 1881 (1); Fanny Lansberg (1858-1882) m 1884 (2); Emma Marguerite Ruth Plumstead (1861-1941)	Albert Beyfus (1852–1928) m 1882; Esther DeFrece (1862-1943)	Ada Fanny Beyfus (1854–1916) m 1876; Edgar Israel Cohen (1853-1933)	Rose Beyfus (1856–1921) m 1879 (1); Count Max Hollander (1855-1906) m 1918 (2); Charles Dawson	Walter Beyfus (1858-1929) m 1896; Elfrida Cosier (1860-1933)	Esther Beyfus (1860-1889) m 1881; Joseph George Moss (1850-1925)
Gilbert Hugh Beyfus (1885-1960) m 1929 (1); Margaret Moore (1904-1977) m 1949 (2); Joan Hilda Grant (1922-1973) m 1953 (3); Eileen Louisa Hill (1926-1988)

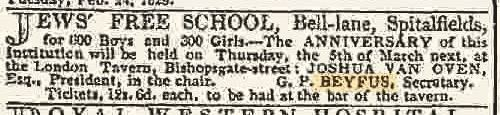
Gotz Philip Beyfus, 25 February 1829

Beyfus's parents were Emmie Marguerite Ruth Plumsted and solicitor Alfred Beyfus. His grandfather, Solomon Beyfus, was a London-based furniture manufacturer, trader, diamond dealer and bill discounter. His great-grandfather, Gotz Philip Beyfus, who came to Britain from Germany in the early part of the 19th century, was a professor of languages, taught in the Western Synagogue and was the secretary of the Jews’ Free School.

Beyfus had one sibling, a half brother called Alfred Butt, who later became a theatre impresario and politician. Many of his uncles had wide-ranging business interests and these included directors of theatres, department stores, fruit importers, a solicitor, diamond dealers and money lenders.

Beyfus was educated at Harrow School (entry 1899) and Trinity College, Oxford where he obtained a second class honours degree in 1907. Later that year he took his examination for the Bar and was awarded a Certificate of Honour. He was called to the Bar at the Inner Temple in January 1908 and took silk in 1933.

== Political life ==
Beyfus stood for parliament in 1910 as a Liberal candidate for the constituency of Cirencester. The Conservative candidate, Benjamin Bathurst, won the seat with a majority of 8.8%. He next tried for a parliamentary seat in Dudley, again as a Liberal candidate. He was selected and the election was due in 1915, but the start of World War I delayed this. In addition, Beyfus had joined the army and was sent to the front in February 1915. After the war he tried again to win a seat and was selected as a National Liberal candidate for Kingswinford where he was beaten in the 1922 election by the Labour incumbent MP Charles Henry Sitch. In 1923 he was approached by the Liberal Party of East Nottingham to be their candidate, but rejected the offer. In 1937 he joined the Conservative Party and applied twice to be candidates for them, but on both occasions failed to be selected.

== Army career and prisoner of war ==
At the start of the First World War Befus volunteered to join the army and was appointed on 15 August 1914 as Second Lieutenant to the 3rd Battalion, West Riding Regiment. He had some previous experience having been a member of the 27th Middlesex (Harrow School), Rifle Corps. He joined his regiment in Belgium at Ypres where he suffered shrapnel wounds during the battle for Hill 60 in April 1915. He returned to duty in May and was assigned to Hill 60, which at this time was in the possession of the allied forces. Beyfus narrowly escaped suffocation when the Germans mounted an attack using gas, but in the confusion he was taken prisoner. During the engagement, Beyfus's cousin, Harold Emanuel Beyfus, who was serving with The London Regiment, was fatally wounded and died two days later in Boulogne hospital.

Beyfus remained a prisoner until the end of the war but made several attempts to escape. Most notable was his attempt, with two fellow escapees, to cross the Baltic Sea in a 16 ft rowing boat. They were spotted by a coastal patrol and taken back to the prison camp.

== Legal career ==
In his early career Beyfus obtained legal work from the firm of solicitors Beyfus & Beyfus, owned by his father and his uncle Philip Beyfus. He also represented family members when they became involved with court actions.

In 1920 Beyfus represented a client in a case that related to a gambling debt. Beyfus won the case on a technicality, but the outcome had consequences for the gaming industry, forcing them to take a test case to the High Court and then to the House of Lords. On both occasions Beyfus's arguments won the day and in consequence the Government were forced to amend the law. Beyfus became one of the country's leading experts on the gaming laws. He gave evidence to the Royal Commission on the subject in 1950 and helped M.P. William Rees-Davies frame a private member's bill.

In 1933 he was appointed King’s Counsel. In 1935 he was involved in another gaming related test case, this time connected to the football pools. The test was to establish if the pools company was in breach of section 26 of the Betting and Lotteries Act 1934. Again Beyfus argued his client's case around a technicality and the judge found in his favour. However, he was not always successful and in 1931 lost a case that involved his client attempting to set up a business selling tickets for Irish Hospitals' Sweepstake in Britain. Ironically a year later Beyfus found out that he had drawn the ticket in the Irish Sweepstake for The Derby favourite Orwell. The horse ran lame resulting in huge disappointment.

In 1958 Beyfus represented John Aspinall and his associate, John Richard Burke, who had both been accused of unlawful gaming in the home of Lady Osborne (Aspinall's Mother). She appeared in court with them but was represented by another barrister. Aspinall had been operating casinos where the principal game was Chemin de Fer, moving locations to avoid the attention of the police. After listening to Beyfus's legal argument the judge told the jury that in his opinion there was no evidence of unlawful gaming and consequently the case was dismissed.

One of the longest and most expensive cases he dealt with was in 1935, when he represented a UK dealership that sold Chrysler motorcars. The owner, Arnold de la Poer, alleged that threats and misrepresentation had been used to force him to sell his shares to the American Chrysler motor corporation. After a hearing that lasted 62 days the judge found in his favour and awarded damages of over £40,000 (equal to £2,459,581) plus costs. Initially the Chrysler corporation intended to appeal, but eventually a settlement was agreed between the parties.

In addition to his legal work related to gaming and divorce Beyfus handled some notable libel cases. In 1957 three members of the Labour Party, Aneurin Bevan, Richard Crossman and Morgan Phillips sued The Spectator for publishing an article by Jenny Nicholson indicating that they were drinking to excess during a convention in Italy. Beyfus won the case for them and they were each awarded £2500 and costs of £4000. In the same year he represented Jaime Ortiz-Patiño in an action against the Sunday Graphic. He was awarded £20,000 after the newspaper withdrew their defence. In 1959 the entertainer Liberace sued the Daily Mirror for publishing an article written by William Connor (Cassandra) that appeared to impute that he was homosexual. Beyfus represented Liberace, but by this time he was 74 years old, suffering from ill health, and his appearance did not inspire confidence in his client. However, in court he showed all his old flair and won the case and £8000 damages for his client.

By now Beyfus was terminally ill but kept working. His final case was one of slander and libel involving the Duchess of Argyll and her dispute with a former social secretary, Yvonne Macpherson, who was Beyfus's client. The jury found in favour of Mrs Macpherson and she was awarded £7000.

== Marriages ==
Beyfus married three times. His first wife was Margaret Moore, a revue actress (real name Margaret Malone, formally Margaret Ella Squires) who was aged 25 when they married in 1929. They had one child named John Gilbert who in later life became a pilot in the Fleet Air Arm. The couple parted in 1947 and two years later Beyfus remarried to 29-year-old divorcee Joan Hilda Grant (surname at birth Croker and formerly married to John Hook). They divorced within two years and Beyfus married for the third time in 1953 to 27-year-old Eileen Louisa Hill; they remained together until his death in 1960 at his home in Haslemere.
