= Joseph Timothy Haydn =

British journalist and dictionary compiler (1788–1856)

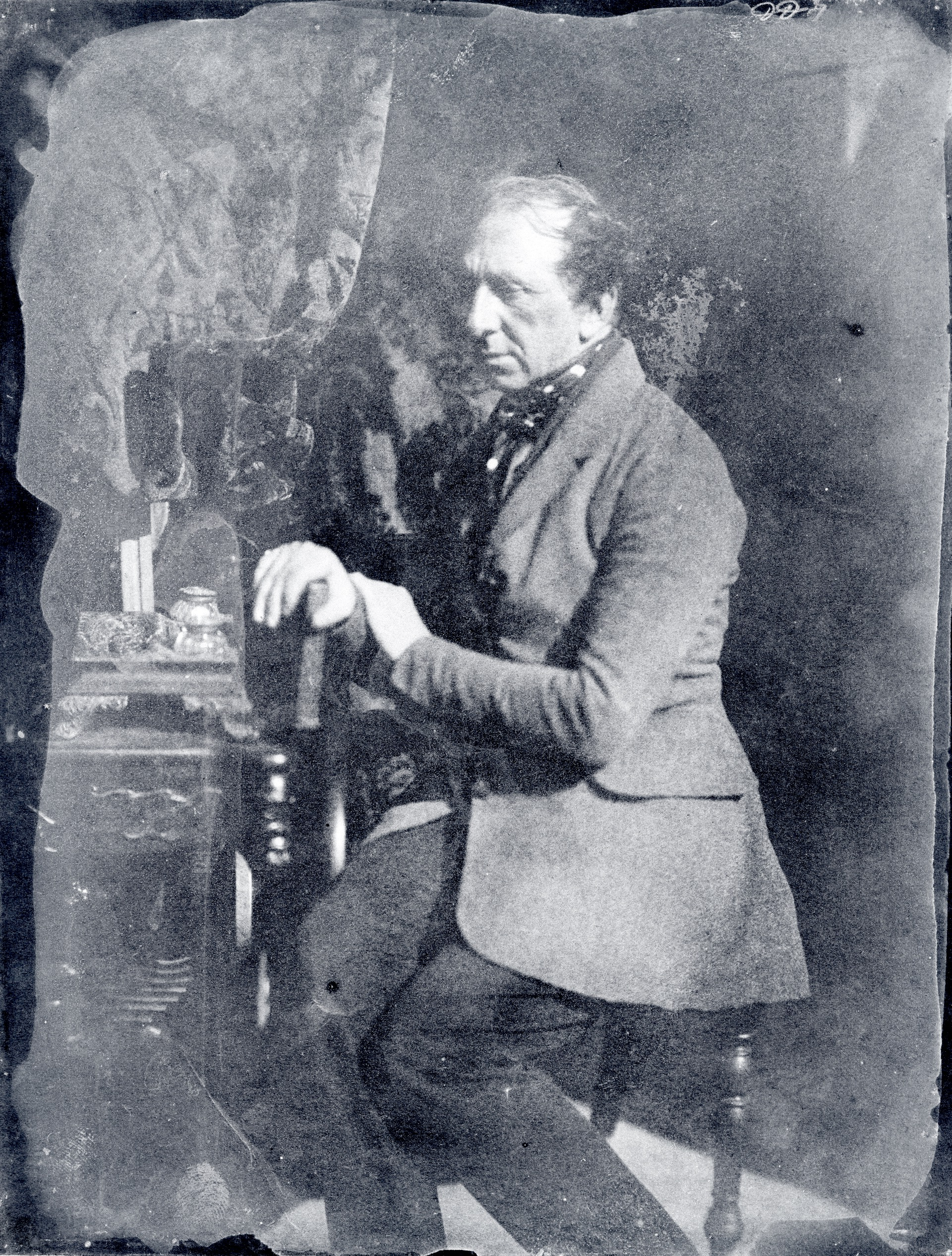
- Born: 1788; Lisbon
- Died: 17 January 1856; London
- Occupations: Lexicographer, writer

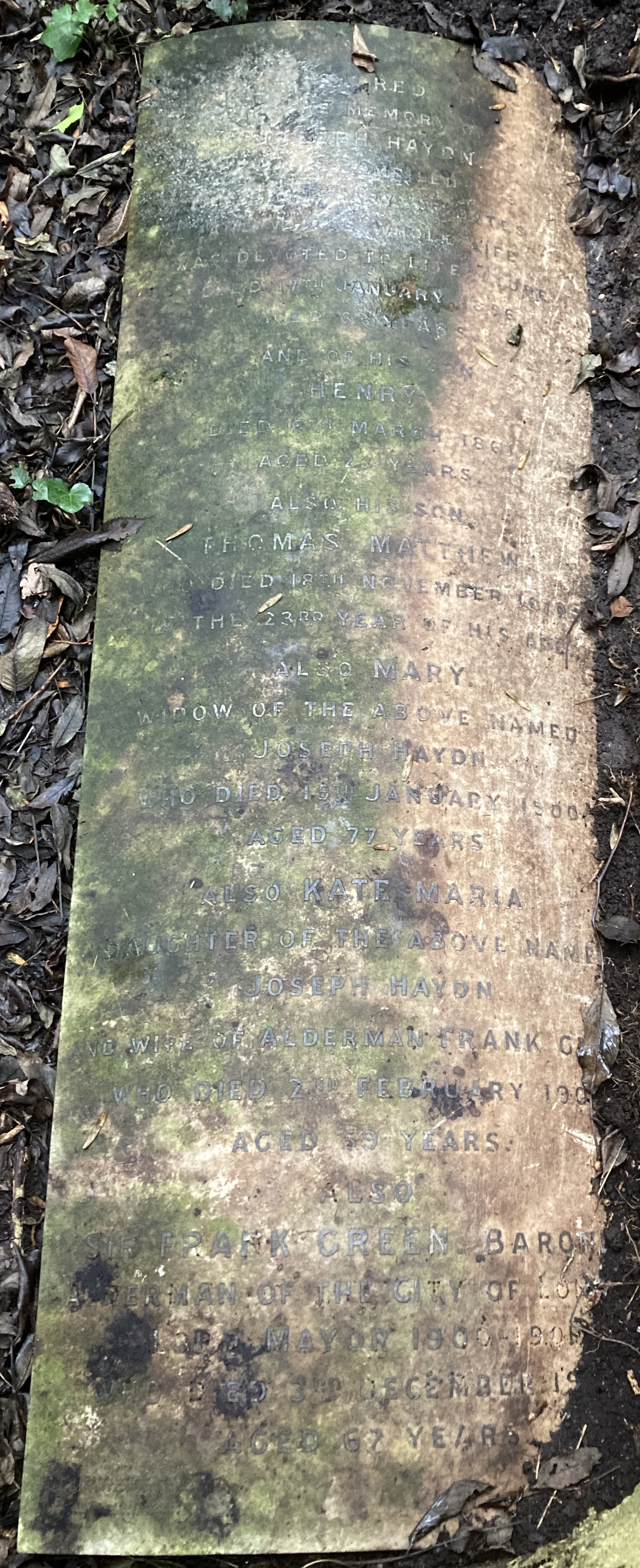
Haydn family grave in Highgate Cemetery

Joseph Timothy Haydn (Lisbon, Portugal, 1788 – London, 17 January 1856) was a British journalist and compiler of dictionaries, well known as the author of the Dictionary of Dates, which went through many editions from 1841, and of the Book of Dignities, 1851 (3rd revised edition, 1894).

== Career ==
The Book of Dignities was a modernized form of Robert Beatson's Political Index, but omits the lists of holders of many important offices. He also edited Samuel Lewis's Topographical Dictionaries. His name is used in the "Haydn Series" of dictionaries, which are on the same lines as those he compiled. He does not, however, appear to have taken any part in their actual compilation. They are the Universal Index of Biography, edited by J. B. Payne, 1870; Bible Dictionary, edited by C. Boutell, 1871 (2nd edition, 1878); Dictionary of Popular Medicine and Hygiene, edited by Dr. E. Lankester, 1874 (2nd edition, 1878).

For a short time before his death, aged 69 years, on 18 January 1856, Haydn had received a small pension of £25 granted by the government. It was continued to his widow.

He was buried in a common grave (no.7040) on the western side of Highgate Cemetery. His is the first name listed on the nearby Haydn family grave, where his wife Mary, sons Henry and Thomas Matthew (who purchased the grave), daughter Kate Maria, and her husband Sir Frank Green, 1st Baronet are buried.
