= Sir Frank Green, 1st Baronet =

British businessman and baronet (1835 – 1902)

Sir Frank Green Bt
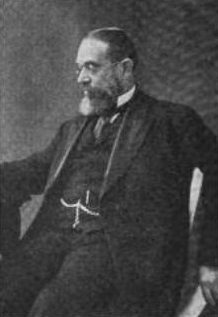
- In The Sketch, 3 October 1900

572nd Lord Mayor of London
- In office 1901

Sheriff of London
- In office 1897–1898

Personal details
- Born: 28 November 1835 Maidstone, England
- Died: 3 December 1902 (aged 67) London, England
- Resting place: Highgate Cemetery
- Spouse: Kate Haydn (m. 1869; died 1899)
- Children: 6
- Occupation: Businessman

Sir Frank Green, 1st Baronet (28 November 1835 – 3 December 1902) was a British businessman who was the 572nd Lord Mayor of London.

== Early life ==
Green was born at Maidstone, the eldest son of John Green. He founded and was later senior partner in the London firm Messrs. Green and Company, paper merchants, located in Upper Thames Street.

== Civic career ==
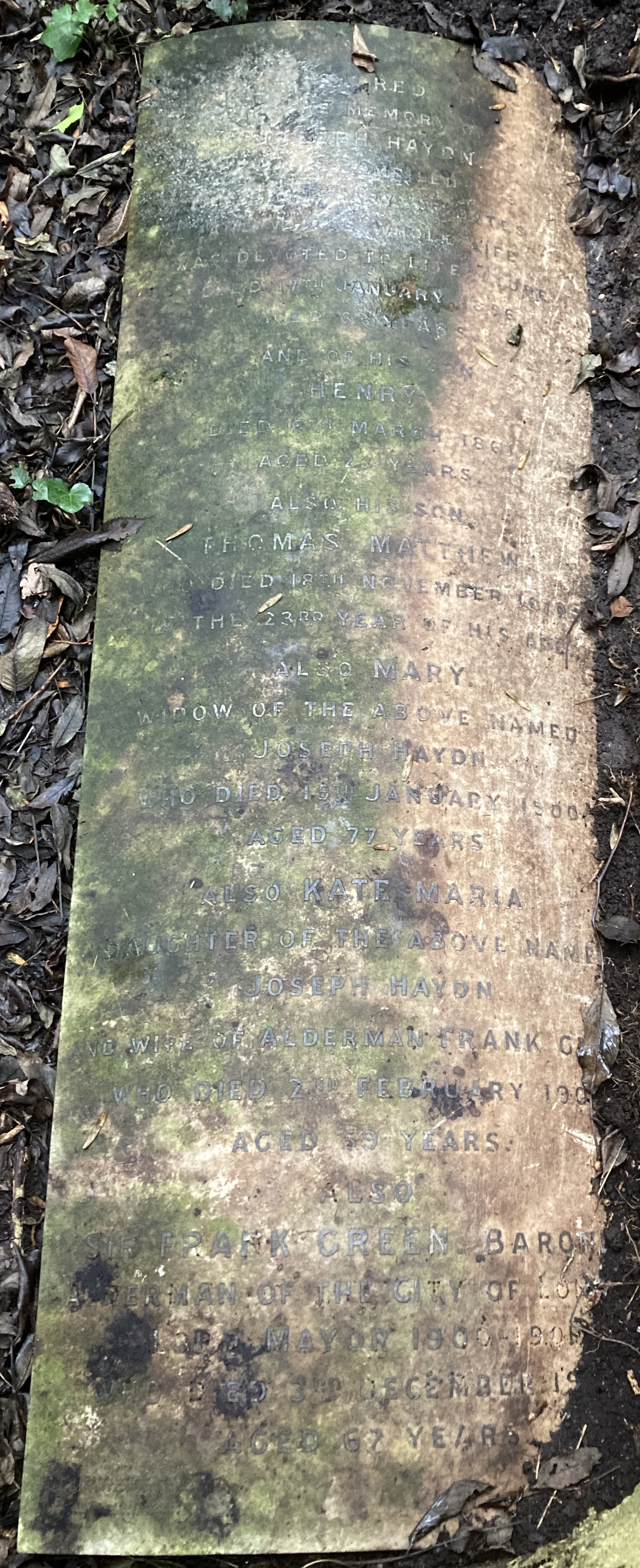
Family grave of Sir Frank Green, 1st Baronet in Highgate Cemetery

He entered the Corporation of the City of London in 1878 as a Common Councillor for Vintry Ward, of which he afterwards became the deputy, and from 1891 Alderman. While in the Common Council he took a leading part in public business, and was chairman of the Bridge Head Estates Committee, chairman of the City Commission of Sewers, and chairman of the City Lands Committee. He was a member of the Stationers Company and of the Glaziers' Company, and served as Master of each company.

He was elected as Sheriff of London for 1897–98. In November 1900 he was elected Lord Mayor of London for the following year. His term of office was a very busy one, as it coincided with the death and state funeral of Queen Victoria, followed by the accession of her successor King Edward VII. He instituted the National Memorial to the late Queen, and also paid formal visits to Glasgow, Manchester and Winchester. At the close of his mayoralty, the King announced his intention of creating him a baronet in the 9 November 1901 Birthday Honours list. He was subsequently created a Baronet, of Belsize Park Gardens, in the Metropolitan Borough of Hampstead, in the County of London, on 15 December 1901. He was one of the Lieutenants of the City of London, and a governor and almoner of Christ's Hospital, London.

He died after a brief illness at his residence in Belsize Park Gardens, London, on 3 December 1902 and was buried on the western side of Highgate Cemetery.

== Family ==
Green married in 1869 Kate Haydn, daughter of Joseph Timothy Haydn. She died on 2 February 1900 in Hampstead. They had two daughters and four sons, three of whom successively succeeded as baronet, after which the title became extinct.

- Francis Haydn Green (1871–1956), later 2nd Baronet
- Kathleen Mary Haydn Green (1872-1944), who acted as Lady Mayoress while her father was Lord Mayor
- Nora Frances Haydn Green (1877-1958)
- Leonard Henry Haydn Green (1879–1958), later 3rd Baronet
- Harold Haydn Green (1880-1922)
- George Arthur Haydn Green (1884–1959), later 4th Baronet

Civic offices
Preceded by Sir Alfred Newton	Lord Mayor of London; 1900–1901	Succeeded by Sir Joseph Dimsdale
Baronetage of the United Kingdom
New creation	Baronet (of Belsize Park Gardens); 1901–1902	Succeeded by Francis Haydn Green
