= Solomon Beyfus =

Patriarch of extended Jewish family

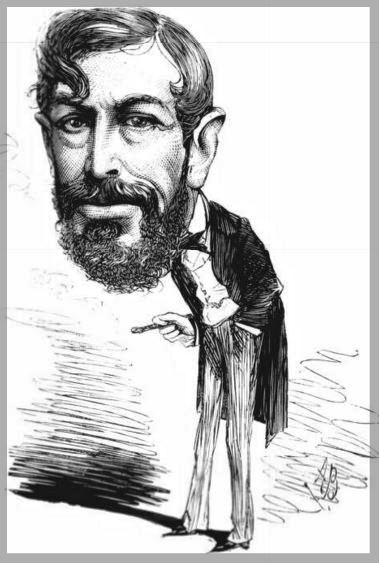
Solomon Beyfus 1820–1893

Solomon Beyfus (1820–1893) was an English trader in London's East End and the head of a Jewish family that became influential in both the theatres and courtrooms of Britain.

== Early life ==
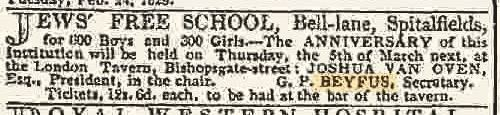
Gotz Philip Beyfus, 25 February 1829

His father, Gotz Philip Beyfus, a Jewish émigré from Hamburg in Germany, was born about 1788; he was a professor of language, the secretary of the Jews' Free School and taught in the Western Synagogue. Solomon's mother, Cippy, was born about 1784 in Plymouth, Devon, England. They had at least three children, Solomon, Philip and Eliza. Solomon, born in Plymouth, married Charlotte Abrahams in 1841; she was the daughter of Esther and Henry Abrahams, a jeweller of Bevis Marks in the City of London. Solomon and Charlotte's had ten children:

Family of Charlotte Abrahams and Solomon Beyfus

Gotz Philip Beyfus (1788–1845) m Cippy ? (1784–1872) | Henry Abrahams (1780–1844) m Esther Isaacs (1774–1858)
Philip Beyfus (1818–1894) | Eliza Beyfus (1826–1867) | Solomon Beyfus (1820–1893) | married 1841 | Charlotte Abrahams (1813–1887)
Julia Beyfus (1843–1896) m 1864; Albert Isaac Boss (1838–1912) | Henry Beyfus (1845–1889) m 1867; Jane Moss (1849–1921) | Gertrude Beyfus (1846–1913) m 1868; Michael John Garcia (1840–1923) | Phillip Beyfus (1848–1941) m 1880; Ellah Ann Jacobs (1857–1931) | Alfred Beyfus (1851–1914) m 1881 (1); Fanny Lansberg (1858–1882) m 1884 (2); Emma Marguerite Ruth Plumstead (1861–1941) | Albert Beyfus (1852–1928) m 1882; Esther DeFrece (1862–1943) | Ada Fanny Beyfus (1854–1916) m 1876; Edgar Israel Cohen (1853–1933) | Rose Beyfus (1856–1921) m 1879 (1); Count Max Hollander (1855–1906) m 1918 (2); Charles Dawson | Walter Beyfus (1858–1929) m 1896; Elfrida Cosier (1860–1933) | Esther Beyfus (1860–1889) m 1881; Joseph George Moss (1850–1925)

=== Business dealings ===
In their youth, Solomon and his brother Philip were French goods traders in the Houndsditch area of London, but they were declared bankrupt in 1843. Due to irregularities they were not granted their certificate of discharge until 1853. However, during this period the brothers were selling furniture, bill discounting and money lending.

In 1853 their sister, Eliza, married collar manufacturer Jacques Vanderlinden. After the death of Eliza in 1867 Vanderlinden was living at Solomon Beyfus's house, 50 Bedford Square, and trading in loans. Other members of Solomon's family involved in this business included his eldest son Henry and son-in-law, Albert Isaac Boss. This became public knowledge in 1875 when Albert Boss and Henry Beyfus sued the newspaper World for publishing "malicious and defamatory libel". Evidence was given that Solomon Beyfus was a cabinet maker based in City Road, and also operated as a bill discounter with an establishment in Old Burlington.

=== Beyfus and Beyfus ===
Two of Charlotte and Solomon's sons, Alfred and Philip, became solicitors and established the legal firm of Beyfus & Beyfus. Alfred married Emma Plumstead in 1884 and they had one child, a son who became the renowned barrister Gilbert Hugh Beyfus, QC. He represented clients such as Liberace, John Aspinall and Aneurin Bevan.

=== Alfred Butt ===
Alfred Beyfus had another child from a previous relationship who was named Alfred Butt (1878–1962). Butt began his career as a clerk at the department store Harrods, where his uncle, Edgar Israel Cohen, was a director. Cohen, who had married Solomon's daughter Ada in 1876, came from a family of East End merchants dealing in sea sponges and cigars. In the 1890s Cohen left the family business and moved into retail, becoming a director of D.H.Evans and Harrods. He was the first to introduce taxi-cabs to the streets of London in about 1907 and was involved in the theatre, providing financial support for Lillie Langtry when she refitted and renovated the Imperial Theatre in London. He made a fortune in his lifetime and spent it, dying in 1933 and leaving just £5 in his will.

Butt moved from Harrods in 1898 to the Palace Theatre, London, where he was first appointed the secretary and then became the business manager. The chairman at the Palace was his uncle, art dealer Count Max Hollender, who had married Solomon's daughter, Rose in 1879. Another family connection was the theatre's solicitors who were Beyfus & Beyfus. Butt became the youngest theatre manager in London when he replaced 86-year-old Charles Morton in 1904. In 1902 Butt married Georgina Mary Say, who was the niece of Emma Plumstead.

=== Family connections ===
Solomon and Charlotte had two other children with links to the theatre; they were Albert Beyfus and Gertrude Beyfus:

Albert married Essie (Esther) de Frece, American born cousin of impresario Sir Walter de Frece. Essie's father, Benjamin, had emigrated to America prior to 1850 where he traded as a whalebone manufacturer. In 1910 Alfred Butt and Walter de Frece joined forces to form the Variety Theatres Controlling Company, the second largest such organisation in the country after Moss Empires.

Gertrude Beyfus married Michael John Garcia, who was a partner in the fruit importers and distributors, Simons, Jacobs & Co. The senior partner of this business, Michael Simons, was the founder and chairman of Howard & Wyndham Ltd., one of the largest non-variety theatre companies in Britain.

== Final years and legacy ==
Solomon was said to be deeply religious, generous, a gambler and a "character". He was admitted to the Freedom of the City of London on 25 November 1858, declaring that his father, Gotze Philip Beyfus late of Birmingham, was teacher of languages and had lived at 7 Bury Street in the City of London, a location adjacent to the Bevis Marks Synagogue.

Solomon died on 27 March 1893, leaving £81,326; his executors were his sons Alfred and Philip plus his son-in-law Michael John Garcia. His wife Charlotte predeceased him, having died in 1887.

The legal firm of Beyfus & Beyfus passed down to Solomon's grandchild Harry Max Beyfus (son of Philip and Ellah). Harry eventually became bankrupt after gambling on the stock market and then losing money on a night-club venture in Regent Street.
