= Harrods Christmas bear =

Plush toys created by Harrods

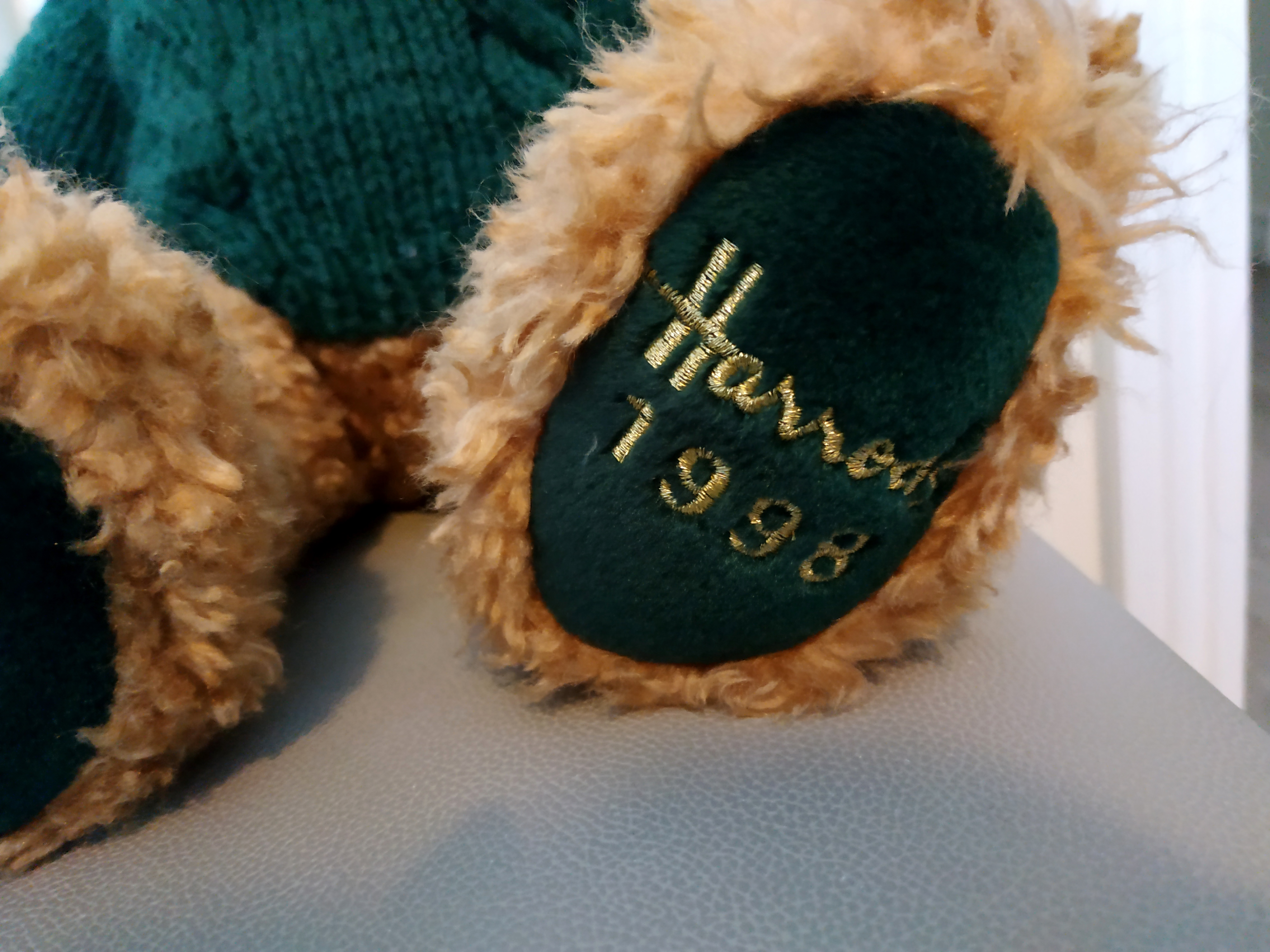
Paw of a 1998 edition Harrods Christmas bear

The Harrods Christmas bear is a teddy bear created by the Harrods department store in London, England in 1986. A limited edition Christmas bear is released every year to celebrate the Christmas season, and bears from years' past have since become valuable collector's items. They can be recognised by the Harrods logo and year of release embroidered on their left paw.

== The first Harrods Christmas Bear ==
Snowy, the first Harrods Christmas bear, appeared in 1986 wearing a knitted hat and scarf. This first bear was the only one not to have the distinguishable logo and year on his left paw, and he originally sold at a price of £14.95. He was reproduced in 1995 – this time with the logo and the date, 1986, on his paw. Original, undated bears are incredibly hard to find (reputedly, even the Harrods archive does not have one) and can sell for upwards of £600.

Since 1986, a bear has been released every year released in time for Christmas. Each bear wears a different outfit and care is taken to ensure that each year's bear is different to those from previous years. In the early years, the bears did not have names. The first named bear, William, was released in 2003. Since then, every bear released has his own name which is decided from a shortlist and is accompanied by a tag telling his story. As the popularity of the bears grew, consumer demand led to all bears from before 2003 being retroactively given names

Harrods Christmas Bear names by year
| Year | Name |
|---|---|
| 1986 | Snowy |
| 1999 | James |
| 2000 | Merlin |
| 2001 | Scott |
| 2002 | Giles |
| 2003 | William |
| 2004 | Thomas |
| 2005 | Nicolas |
| 2006 | Alexander |
| 2007 | Benjamin |
| 2008 | Oscar |
| 2009 | Maxwell |
| 2010 | Archie |
| 2011 | Freddie |
| 2012 | Chester |
| 2013 | Sebastian |
| 2014 | Jasper |
| 2015 | Benedict |
| 2016 | Hugh |
| 2017 | Bertie |
| 2018 | Oliver |
| 2019 | Joshua |
| 2020 | Nicholas |
| 2021 | Angus |
| 2022 | Louie |
| 2023 | Ethan |
| 2024 | Noah |
| 2025 | Alfie |
| 2026 | Henry |

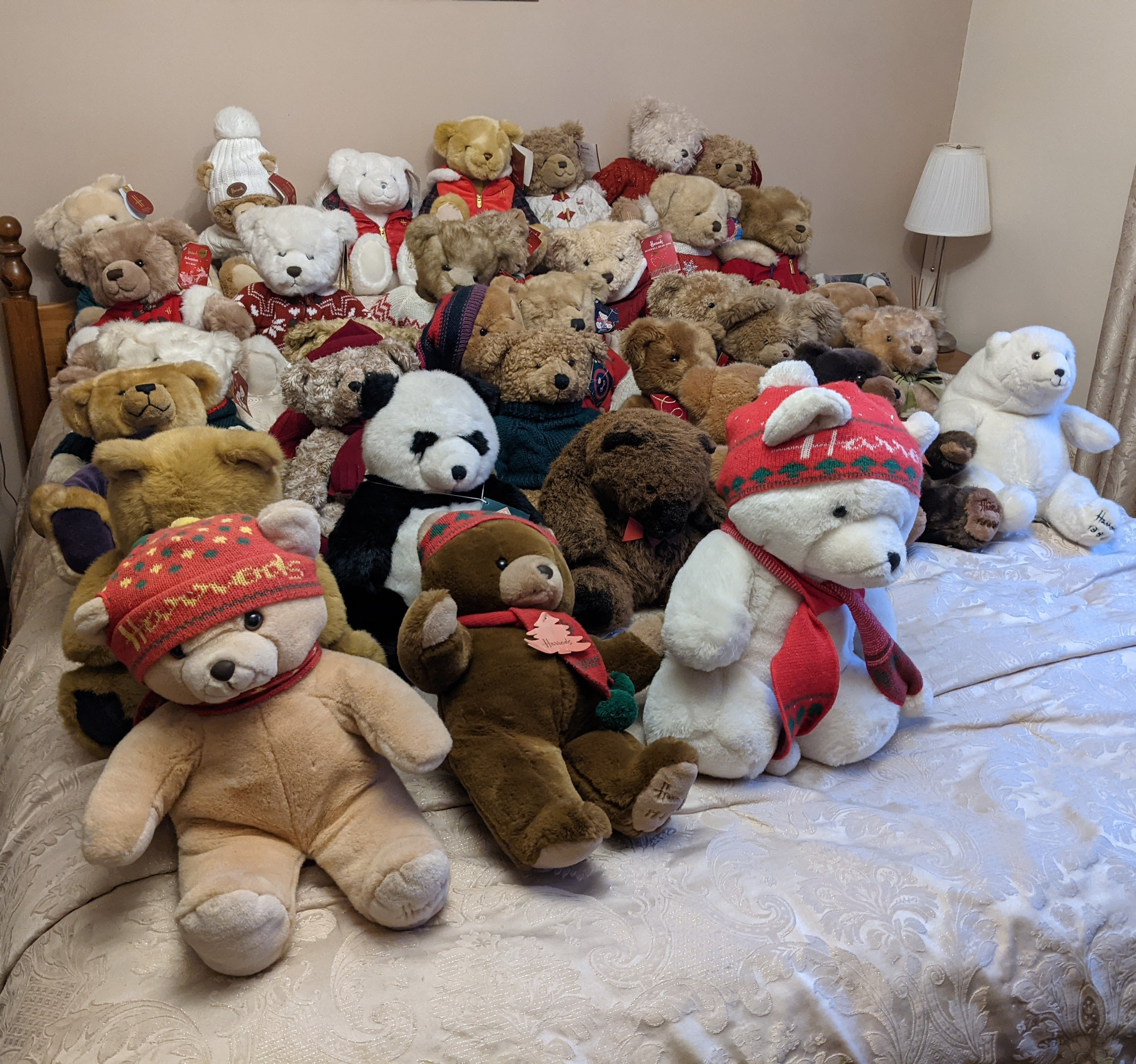
Harrods Christmas Bear collection 1986-2020. Image supplied by UK collector.
