= City of London Imperial Volunteers =

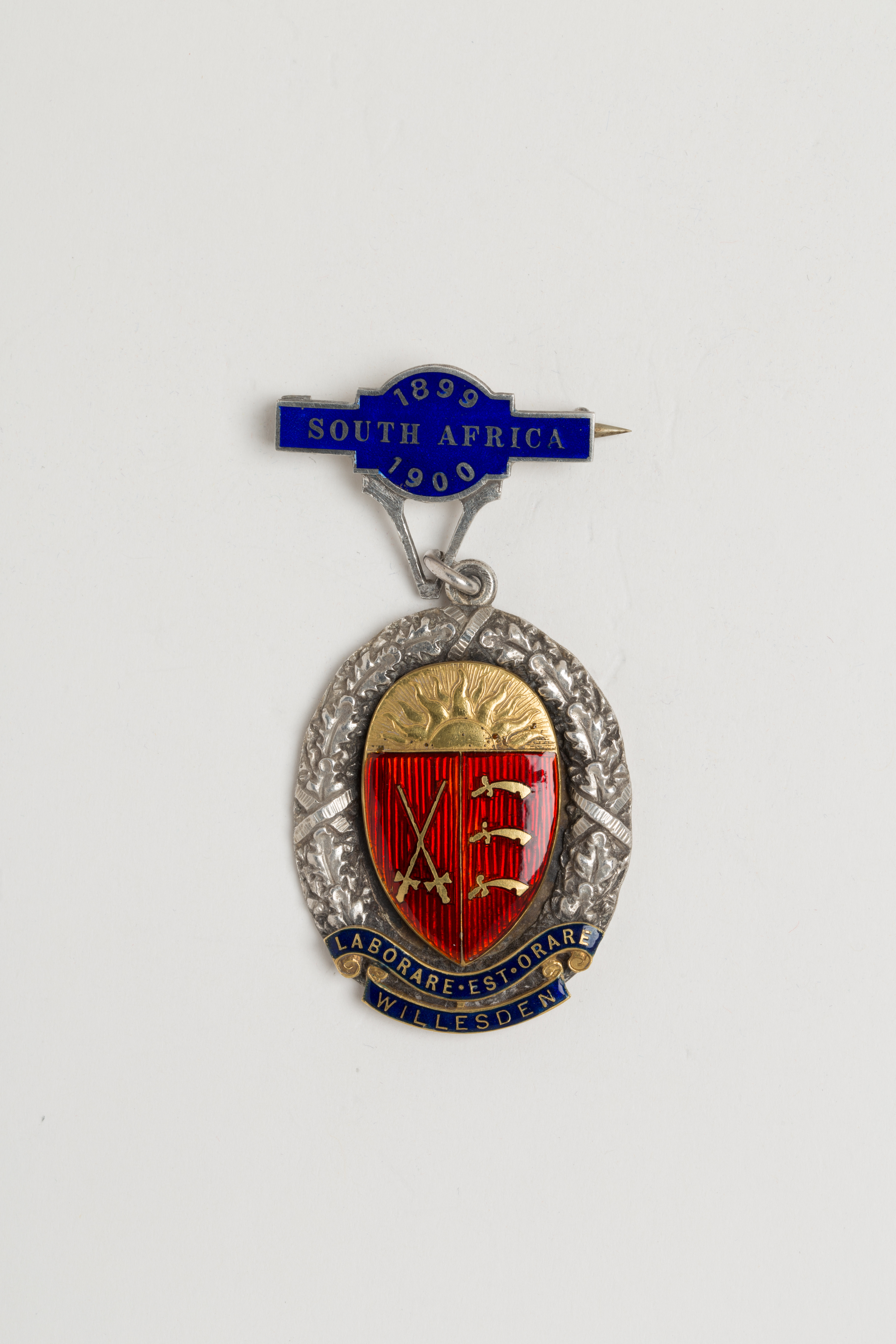
- Commemorative medal issued to a member of the City Imperial Volunteers
- Active: 24 December 1899 – December 1900
- Country: United Kingdom
- Type: Volunteer Regiment
- Role: Infantry; Field Artillery
- Engagements: Second Boer War

Commanders
- Colonel of the Regiment: Colonel Henry Mackinnon

The City of London Imperial Volunteers (CIV) was a British corps of volunteers during the Second Boer War.

== History ==
After the outbreak of the Second Boer War in October 1899, volunteer corps were established in most counties of the United Kingdom to provide officers and men for service in South Africa. In December a proposal was put forward that the City of London should sponsor a volunteer troop of soldiers to take part in the conflict. The Lord Mayor, Alfred James Newton was approached by Colonel Boxall on the subject and within days he had reached agreement with various City livery companies, bankers, merchants and the Court of Common Council to support and fund the venture. A corps of Imperial volunteers to be raised and equipped by the City of London was authorized by Royal Warrant dated 24 December 1899 with the name City of London Imperial Volunteers - CIV for short. The corps included an infantry division, a mounted infantry division, and a field battery (artillery) division. The infantry and mounted infantry divisions were composed of about 1,400 men recruited mainly from existing volunteer regiments in London and Middlesex, while the artillery division was composed of about 150 men recruited from the Honourable Artillery Company and the City of London Artillery forming a battery of four 12½ pounder quick-firing guns, manufactured by Messrs Vickers' Sons & Maxim.

There was also a cyclist section, which was mainly in charge of despatches.

The first volunteers were registered at the Guildhall on 1 January 1900. All the officers and men received the Freedom of the City of London before departure. Most of the men proceeded to South Africa in January and February 1900, returned in October the same year, and the corps was disbanded on 1 December 1900. The January 1900 contingent sailed aboard the SS Garth Castle of Castle Line. The later contingent, comprising the HAC battery of four guns, sailed (with other territorial units from Oxford and Ireland) in the SS Montfort of Canadian Pacific Line on 3 February 1900.

The corps was part of the huge force assembled to relieve Kimberley on 15 February 1900, and came under fire for the first time during actions at Jacobsdal the following day.

Colonel Henry Mackinnon served as colonel commandant of the corps, with Major Gilbert McMicking in charge of the field battery, Lieutenant-Colonel Hugh Cecil Cholmondeley in charge of mounted infantry, and Arnold Keppel, Earl of Albemarle in charge of infantry.

Field Marshal Lord Roberts accepted the honorary colonelcy of the corps after they had served under him following the relief of Kimberley, formalized on 10 March 1900.

== Bibliography ==
- In The Ranks of the C. I. V. (1900) by Erskine Childers
- Annual Army list, militia list and yeomanry cavalry list for 1901, Lieutenant-General H. G. Hart (Hart's Army list 1901)
- The HAC in South Africa (1903) by Basil Williams
