= Arthur Burbidge =

English cricketer

Personal information
- Full name: Arthur Burbidge
- Born: c. 1836; Camberwell, Surrey, England
- Died: 18 December 1890; Swanage, Dorset, England
- Batting: Unknown
- Relatives: Frederick Burbidge (brother)

Domestic team information
- Years: Team
- 1857: Surrey

Career statistics
Competition	First-class
Matches	4
Runs scored	54
Batting average	7.71
100s/50s	–/–
Top score	13
Balls bowled	–
Wickets	–
Bowling average	–
5 wickets in innings	–
10 wickets in match	–
Best bowling	–
Catches/stumpings	–/–
- Source: Cricinfo, 3 April 2012

Arthur Burbidge (c. 1836 – 18 December 1890) was an English cricketer. Burbidge's batting style is unknown. He was born at Camberwell, Surrey.

Burbidge made his first-class debut for Surrey against Cambridgeshire in 1857 at Fenner's, before playing in the return fixture between the two sides at The Oval. He later made two further appearances in first-class cricket, for the Gentlemen of the North against the Gentlemen of the South in 1861 and for the Gentlemen of the South against the Gentlemen of the North in 1862. In his four first-class matches, Burbidge scored 54 runs at an average of 7.71, with a high score of 13.

He died at Swanage, Dorset on 18 December 1890. His brother Frederick also played first-class cricket.
