= Harrods =

British department store

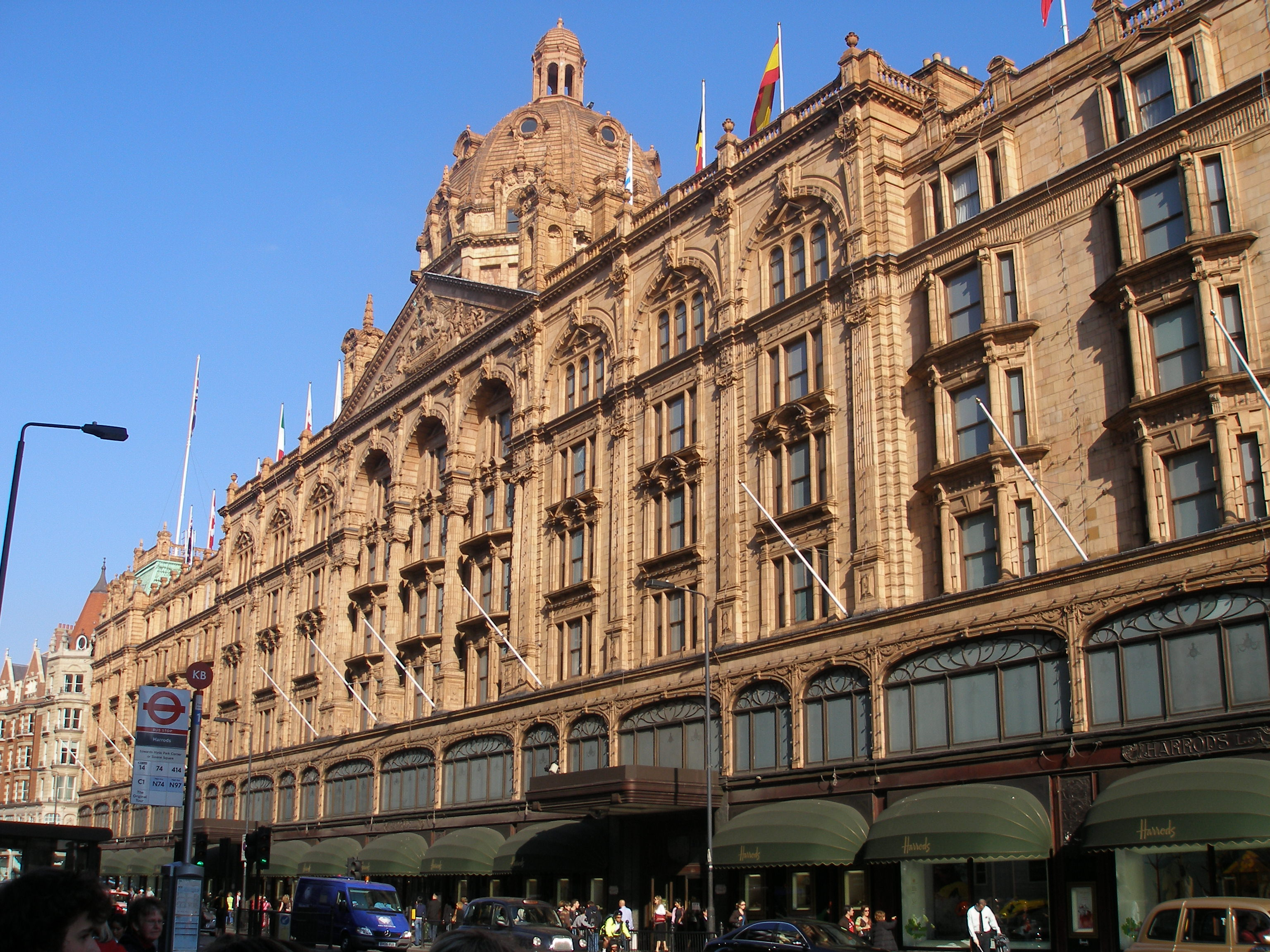
- Exterior of Harrods (2007)

General information
- Status: Open
- Type: Department store
- Architectural style: Victorian
- Location: 87–135 Brompton Road, Knightsbridge, London, England, SW1X 7XL
- Coordinates: 51°29′59″N 00°09′49″W
- Named for: Charles Henry Harrod
- Year built: 1894–1905
- Opened: 1905
- Client: Charles Digby Harrod
- Owner: Harrods Group (Qatar Investment Authority)

Technical details
- Floor area: 1,100,000 square feet (100,000 m^{2}) of selling space
- Grounds: 5 acres (20,000 m^{2})

Design and construction
- Architect: C. W. Stephens

Other information
- Number of restaurants: 22
- Public transit: Knightsbridge: Piccadilly line

Website
- harrods.com

Listed Building – Grade II*
- Designated: 15 April 1969
- Reference no.: 1294346

Harrods is a luxury department store on Brompton Road in Knightsbridge, London, England. The building was designed by C. W. Stephens for Charles Digby Harrod, and opened in 1905; it replaced the first store on the grounds founded by his father Charles Henry Harrod in 1849, which burned down in 1881. The store spans 1,100,000 square feet (100,000 m^{2}) of selling space, making it the largest department store in Europe and one of the largest in the world. Harrods is one of the most famous department stores worldwide, attracting 15 million visitors annually as of 2023. Its building was Grade II* listed on the National Heritage List in 1969.

The original holding company, Harrod's Stores Limited, was formed and began trading on the London Stock Exchange in 1889. It was acquired by and merged into the House of Fraser in 1959, which itself was acquired by the Fayed brothers and became a privately held company in 1985. When the House of Fraser was relisted on the stock exchange, the Harrods business was split off to remain privately held in 1994. The present-day legal entity, the Harrods Group, was established by the Fayed brothers in 2006. It was sold to the Qatar Investment Authority, the sovereign wealth fund of Qatar, in 2010.

== History ==
In 1824, at the age of 25, Charles Henry Harrod established a business at 228 Borough High Street in Southwark. He ran this business, variously listed as a draper, mercer, and a haberdasher, until at least 1831. During 1825, the business was listed as 'Harrod and Wicking, Linen Drapers, Retail', but this partnership was dissolved at the end of that year. His first grocery business appears to be as 'Harrod & Co. Grocers' at 163 Upper Whitecross Street, Clerkenwell, E.C.1., in 1832.

In 1834, in London's East End, he established a wholesale grocery in Stepney at 4 Cable Street with a special interest in tea. Attempting to capitalise on trade during the Great Exhibition of 1851 in nearby Hyde Park, in 1849 Harrod took over a small shop in the district of Brompton, on the site of the current store. Beginning in a single room employing two assistants and a messenger boy, Harrod's son Charles Digby Harrod built the business into a thriving retail operation selling medicines, perfumes, stationery, fruits and vegetables. Harrods rapidly expanded, acquired the adjoining buildings, and employed one hundred people by 1881.

In early December 1883, the store was destroyed by a fire. Charles Harrod fulfilled all of his commitments to his customers to make Christmas deliveries that year. In short order, a new building was built on the same site. Harrods later extended credit to selected customers, including Oscar Wilde, Lillie Langtry, Ellen Terry, Charlie Chaplin, Noël Coward, Gertrude Lawrence, Laurence Olivier and Vivien Leigh, Sigmund Freud, A. A. Milne, and many members of the British royal family. Beatrix Potter frequented the store from the age of 17. First published in 1902, her children's book, The Tale of Peter Rabbit, was soon on sale in Harrods, accompanied by the world's first licensed character, a Peter Rabbit soft toy (Peter and toys of other Potter characters appeared in Harrods catalogues from 1910). In 1921, Milne bought the 18-inch Alpha Farnell teddy bear from the store for his son Christopher Robin Milne who would name it Edward, then Winnie, becoming the basis for Winnie-the-Pooh. In December 1926, Agatha Christie, who visited Harrods as a girl, marvelled at the spectacle of the store's Christmas display. The store has also featured in fiction, for example Mr. Bean (played by Rowan Atkinson) visited Harrods to buy Christmas decorations in the 1992 Mr. Bean episode "Merry Christmas, Mr. Bean".

On 16 November 1898, Harrods debuted England's first "moving staircase" (escalator) in their Brompton Road stores; the device was actually a woven leather conveyor belt-like unit with a mahogany and "silver plate-glass" balustrade. Nervous customers were offered brandy at the top to revive them after their 'ordeal'.

The store was a founding member of the International Association of Department Stores from 1928 until 1935; its then-president, Frank Chitham, director as early as 1920, was also president of the association in 1930.

Mah-Jongg, a lemur, was sold to Stephen Courtauld and Virginia Courtauld (née Peirano) in 1923. Mah-Jongg lived with the Courtaulds for fifteen years, accompanying the couple on their travels and changes of residence, including Eltham Palace in the Royal Borough of Greenwich. In 1969, Christian the lion was bought at Harrods by John Rendall and Anthony 'Ace' Bourke. The lion was set free in Kenya after reaching maturity.

The Disney at Harrods partnership added the Bibbidi Bobbidi Boutique salon on 25 November 2013 to the previously operating Disney Cafe and Disney Store.

== Architecture ==
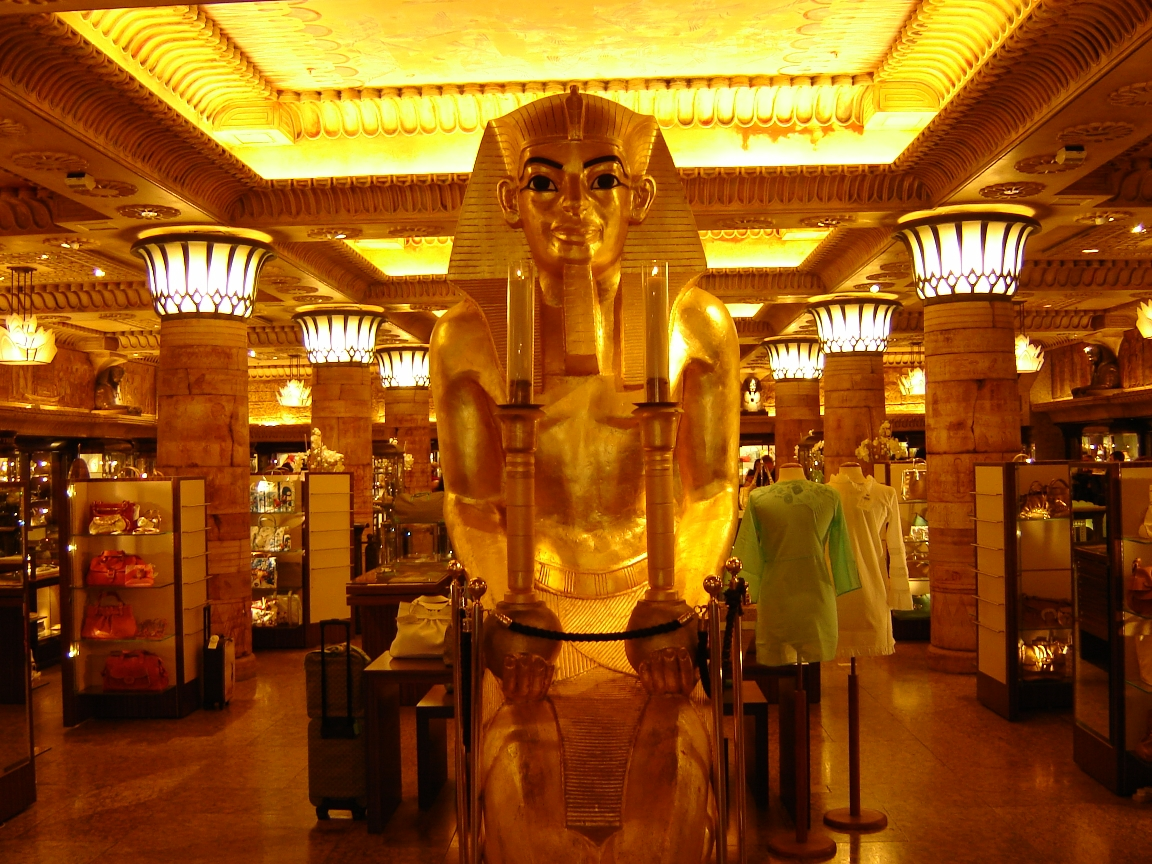
The Egyptian-style clothing department at Harrods

The store occupies a 5-acre (20,000 m^{2}) site and has over one million square feet (90,000 m^{2}) of selling space in over 330 departments making it the biggest department store in Europe. The UK's second-biggest shop, Selfridges, Oxford Street, is a little over half the size with 540,000 square feet (50,000 m^{2}) of selling space. By comparison Europe's second-largest department store the KaDeWe in Berlin has a retail space of 650,000 square feet (60,000 m^{2}).

The figurative sculptures that once adorned the Harrods food hall were consigned for sale at West Middlesex Auction Rooms in 2012. The two Mermaids supporting a giant Clam and the Stag and Boar sheltering under an English Oak are purchased by Greaves & Thomas for inclusion in an elaborate fountain for Ryde, Isle of Wight.

=== Memorials ===
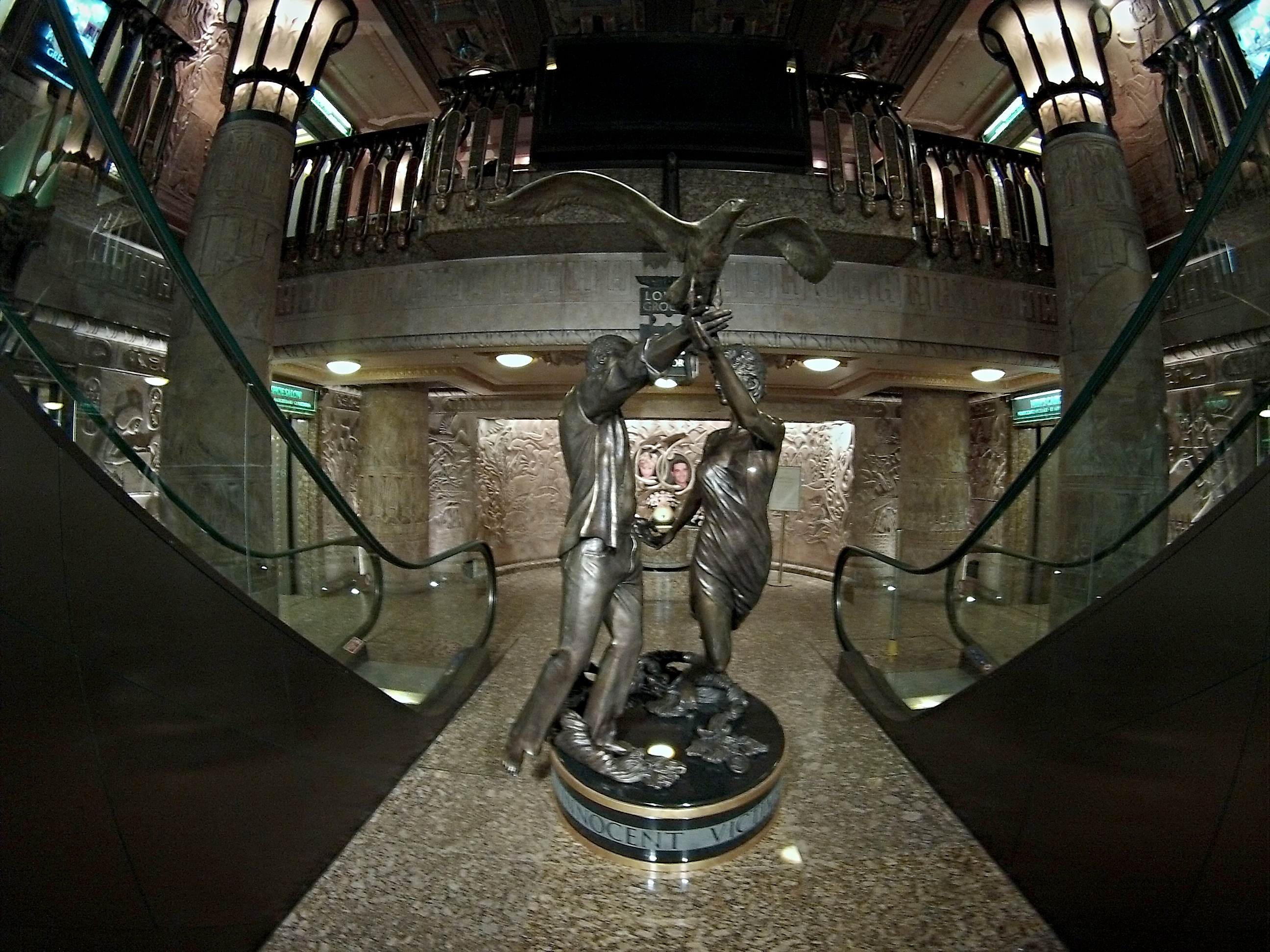
Innocent Victims, Diana, Princess of Wales and Dodi Fayed memorial at Harrods

Following the deaths of Diana, Princess of Wales, and Dodi Fayed, Mohamed Al-Fayed's son, two memorials to the couple commissioned by Al-Fayed were erected inside Harrods. The first, located at the base of the Egyptian Escalator, was unveiled on 12 April 1998, consisting of photographs of the two behind a pyramid-shaped display that holds a wine glass smudged with lipstick from Diana's last dinner as well as what is described as an engagement ring Dodi purchased the day before they died.

The second memorial, unveiled in 2005 and located by the escalator at door three is entitled Innocent Victims, a bronze statue of the two dancing on a beach beneath the wings of an albatross, a bird said to symbolise the "Holy Spirit". The sculpture was created by William Mitchell, a close friend of Al-Fayed and artistic design advisor to Harrods for 40 years. Al-Fayed said he wanted to keep the pair's "spirit alive" through the statue.

== Products and services ==
The Harrods motto is Omnia Omnibus Ubique, which is Latin for "all things for all people, everywhere". Several of its departments, including the Seasonal Christmas department, jewellery departments and the Food Halls, are well known.

The shop's 330 departments offer a wide range of products and services. Products on offer include clothing for women, men, children and infants, electronics, jewellery, sporting gear, bridal trousseau, pet accessories, toys (including Christmas and signature teddy bears), food and drink, health and beauty items, packaged gifts, stationery, housewares, home appliances, furniture, and much more.

A representative sample of shop services includes 23 restaurants, serving everything from high tea to tapas to pub food to haute cuisine; a personal shopping-assistance programme known as "By Appointment"; a watch repair service; a tailor; a dispensing pharmacy; a beauty spa and salon; a barbers shop; Ella Jade Bathroom Planning and Design Service; private events planning and catering; food delivery; a wine steward; bespoke picnic hampers and gift boxes; bespoke cakes; bespoke fragrance formulations; and Bespoke Arcades machines.

Up to 300,000 customers visit the shop on peak days, comprising the highest proportion of customers from non-English speaking countries of any department store in London. More than five thousand staff from over fifty different countries work at Harrods.

In October 2009, Harrods Bank started selling gold bars and coins that customers could buy "off the shelf". The gold products ranged from 1 g to 12.5 kg, and could be purchased within Harrods Bank. They also offered storage services, as well as the ability to sell back gold to Harrods in the future.

Harrods used to provide paid "luggage room" services for storing luggage/ items; however, post COVID they stopped providing this service.

== Customers ==
=== Customer dress code ===
In 1989, Harrods introduced a dress code for customers. The store turned away people whose dress is not in compliance with the code. Forbidden items include cycling shorts; high-cut shorts, Bermuda or beach shorts; swimwear; athletic singlets; flip flops or thong sandals; bare feet; bare midriff; or wearing dirty or unkempt clothing. Patrons found not in compliance with the code and barred from entry include pop star Kylie Minogue, Jason Donovan, Luke Goss, a Scout troop, a woman with a Mohican hair cut, and the entire first team from FC Shakhtar Donetsk who were wearing tracksuits.

As of 2023, Harrods takes the following position: "We do not have a specific dress code for entry into the store, including any of our restaurants. However, we do reserve the right to refuse entry to anyone who is not deemed to be appropriately dressed. Sportswear, including trainers, shorts, and tracksuits, are permitted across all areas of the store and restaurants."

=== Royal warrants ===
Harrods was the holder of royal warrants from:

- Queen Elizabeth II (Provisions and Household Goods)
- Prince Philip, Duke of Edinburgh (Outfitters)
- Charles, Prince of Wales (Outfitters and Saddlers)
- Queen Elizabeth the Queen Mother (China and Glass)

In August 2010, in a letter to The Daily Telegraph, chairman Mohamed Al-Fayed revealed that he had burnt Harrods royal warrants, after taking them down in 2000. Harrods had held the royal warrants since 1910. Describing the warrants as a "curse", Al-Fayed claimed that business had tripled since their removal. Prince Philip removed his warrant in January 2000, and the other warrants were removed from Harrods by Al-Fayed in December, pending their five-yearly review. Prince Philip had been banned from Harrods by Al-Fayed. Film of the burning of the warrants in 2009 was shown in the final scene of Unlawful Killing, a film funded by Al-Fayed and directed by Keith Allen.

== Ownership ==
A chance meeting in London with businessman, Edgar Cohen, eventually led to Charles Harrod selling his interest in the store for £120,000 (equivalent to £13,332,045 in 2025) via a stock market flotation in 1889. The new company was called Harrod's Stores Limited. Sir Alfred James Newton became chairman and Richard Burbidge managing director. Financier William Mendel was appointed to the board in 1891 and he raised funding for many of the business expansion plans. Richard Burbidge was succeeded in 1917 by his son Woodman Burbidge and he in turn by his son Richard in 1935.

The department store was acquired by House of Fraser in 1959, fighting off competition from Debenhams and United Drapery Stores. The business was in turn purchased by the Fayed brothers, Mohamed and Ali, in 1985 for £615 million. In 1994, Harrods was moved out of the House of Fraser Group to remain a private company prior to the group's relisting on the London Stock Exchange. Omar Fayed, Mohamed's youngest son, joined the Harrods board in 2006.

Following denial that it was for sale, Harrods was sold to Qatar Holdings, the sovereign wealth fund of the State of Qatar for £1.5 billion in May 2010. A fortnight previously, chairman of Harrods since 1985, Mohamed Al-Fayed, had stated that "People approach us from Kuwait, Saudi Arabia, Qatar. Fair enough. But I put two fingers up to them. It is not for sale. This is not Marks and Spencer or Sainsbury's. It is a special place that gives people pleasure. There is only one Mecca."

The sale was concluded in the early hours of 8 May, when Qatari Prime Minister Hamad bin Jassim bin Jaber Al Thani came to London to finalise the deal, saying that the acquisition of Harrods would add "much value" to the investment portfolio of Qatar Holdings while his deputy, Hussain Ali Al-Abdulla, called it a "landmark transaction". A spokesman for Mohamed Al-Fayed said "in reaching the decision to retire, [Fayed] wished to ensure that the legacy and traditions that he has built up in Harrods would be continued."

Al-Fayed later revealed in an interview that he decided to sell Harrods following the difficulty in getting his dividend approved by the trustees of the Harrods pension fund. Al-Fayed said "I'm here every day, I can't take my profit because I have to take a permission of those bloody idiots. I say is this right? Is this logic? Somebody like me? I run a business and I need to take the trustee's permission to take my profit." Al-Fayed was appointed honorary chairman of Harrods, a position he held for six months.

== Criticism and controversy ==
=== Staff issues ===
Harrods has been criticised by Guardian journalist Sali Hughes as "deeply sexist" for making female employees wear six kinds of makeup at all times without requiring this of male employees. Harrods was criticised by members of the Black community after the Daily Telegraph reported that Harrods staff told a black woman that she would not be employed unless she chemically straightened her hair, stating that her natural hair style was "unprofessional".

Harrods' restaurants and cafes included a 12.5% discretionary service charge on customers' bills, but failed to share the full proceeds with kitchen and service staff. Several employees joined the UVW union, which claimed that 483 affected employees were losing up to £5,000 each in tips every year. A protest and roadblock organised by the union outside Harrods during the January sales of 2017 was followed by an announcement that "an improved tronc system" would give 100% of service charges to staff.

=== Sexual abuse allegations ===
Twenty female former staff members alleged that during Al Fayed’s ownership, Harrods not only failed to intervene, but helped cover up his sexual abuse of young staff members, including multiple rapes or attempted rapes.

The first report of abuse arose in 1985 soon after Al Fayed took ownership of the store, when a 15-year-old girl alleged she had been inappropriately touched by him. This was dismissed by the Crown prosecution service when Al Fayed denied the claim. Further female staff and ex-staff members have subsequently come forward to add their names to the growing list of workers reportedly abused by Al Fayed and his brother Salah, now being accused of similar activity, with allegations now in the hundreds. A timeline of sexual abuse allegations by current and former staff now exists while investigations continue.

=== Stocking issues ===
Harrods and Mohamed Al-Fayed were criticised for selling real animal fur, provoking regular protests organised outside Harrods. Harrods is the only department store in Britain that has continued to sell fur.

Harrods was sharply criticised in 2004 by the Hindu community for marketing a line of feminine underwear (designed by Roberto Cavalli) which featured the images of Indian goddesses. The line was eventually withdrawn and formal apologies were made.

=== Asma al-Assad ===
Asma al-Assad, the wife of the former President of Syria, Bashar al-Assad, used an alias to shop at Harrods despite economic sanctions imposed by the European Union that froze funds belonging to her and her husband.

=== Trademark litigation ===
In 1986, the town of Ōtorohanga, New Zealand, briefly changed its name to "Harrodsville". This was a protest in support of a restaurateur, Henry Harrod of Palmerston North, who was being forced to change the name of his restaurant following the threat of lawsuits from Mohamed Al Fayed, the then owner of Harrods department store. As a show of solidarity for Henry Harrod, and in anticipation of actions against other similar-sounding businesses, it was proposed that every business in Ōtorohanga change its name to "Harrods". With the support of the District Council, Ōtorohanga temporarily changed the town's name to Harrodsville. After being lampooned in the British tabloids, Al Fayed dropped the legal action and Harrodsville and its shops reverted to their former names. The town's response raised widespread media interest around the world, with the BBC World Service and newspapers in Greece, Saudi Arabia, Australia and Canada covering the story.

On 27 October 2008, in the case of Harrods Ltd v. Harrods Limousine Ltd, the Harrods store applied to the Company Names Tribunal under s.69(1)(b) Companies Act 2006 for a change of name of Harrods Limousine Ltd, which had been registered at Companies House since 14 November 2007. The application went un-defended by the respondent and the adjudicator ordered on 16 January 2009 that Harrods Limousine Ltd must change their name within one month. Additionally the respondent was ordered not to cause or permit any steps to be taken to register another company with an offending name which could interfere, due to its similarity, with the goodwill of the applicant. Finally, Harrods Limousine Ltd was ordered to pay Harrods' costs for the litigation.

== Incidents ==
- 1983: A terrorist attack by the Provisional IRA outside the Brompton store kills six people.
- 1993: An IRA terrorist attack injures four people.

== Gallery ==
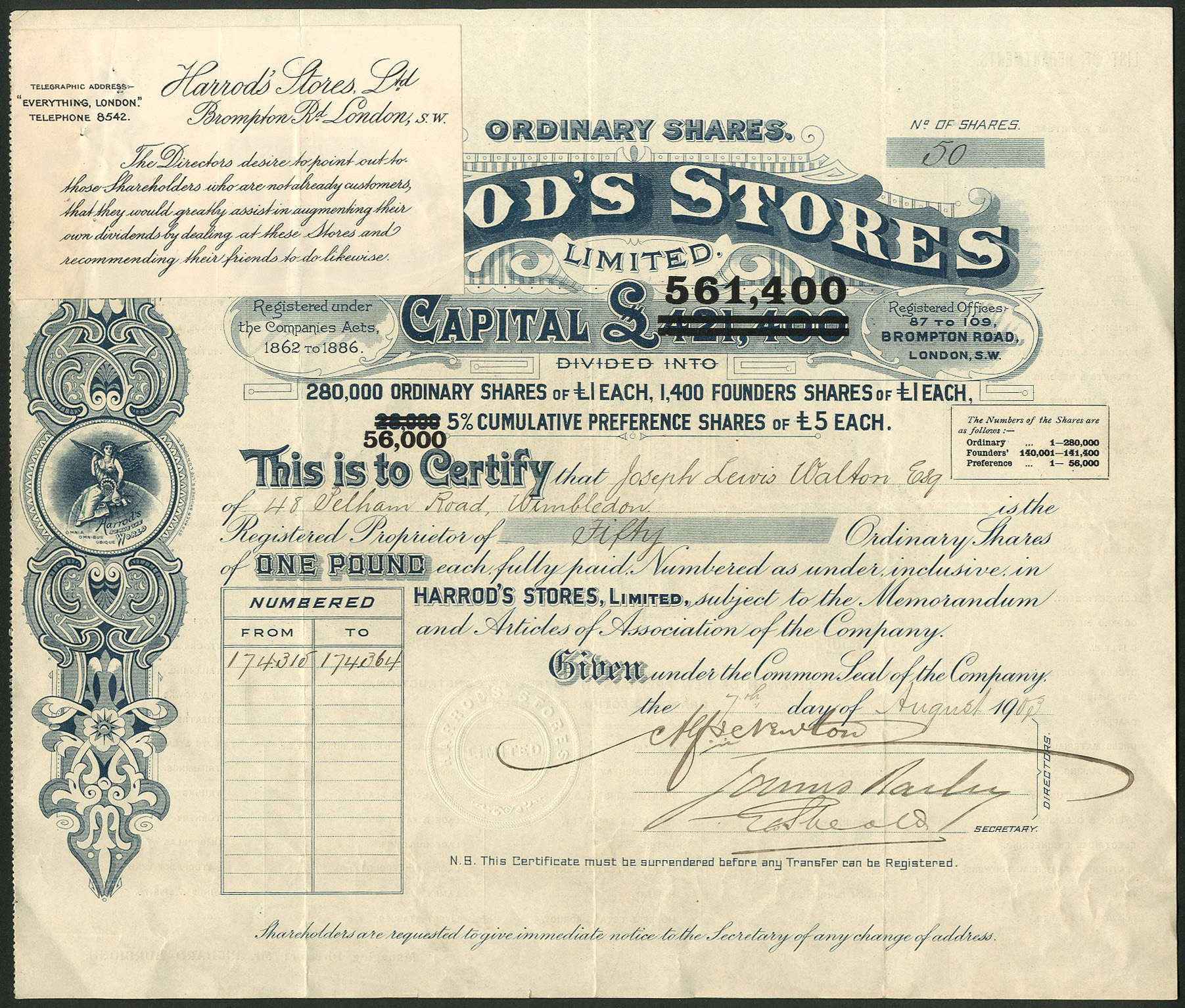
Share of the Harrod's Stores Ltd., issued 7 August 1903

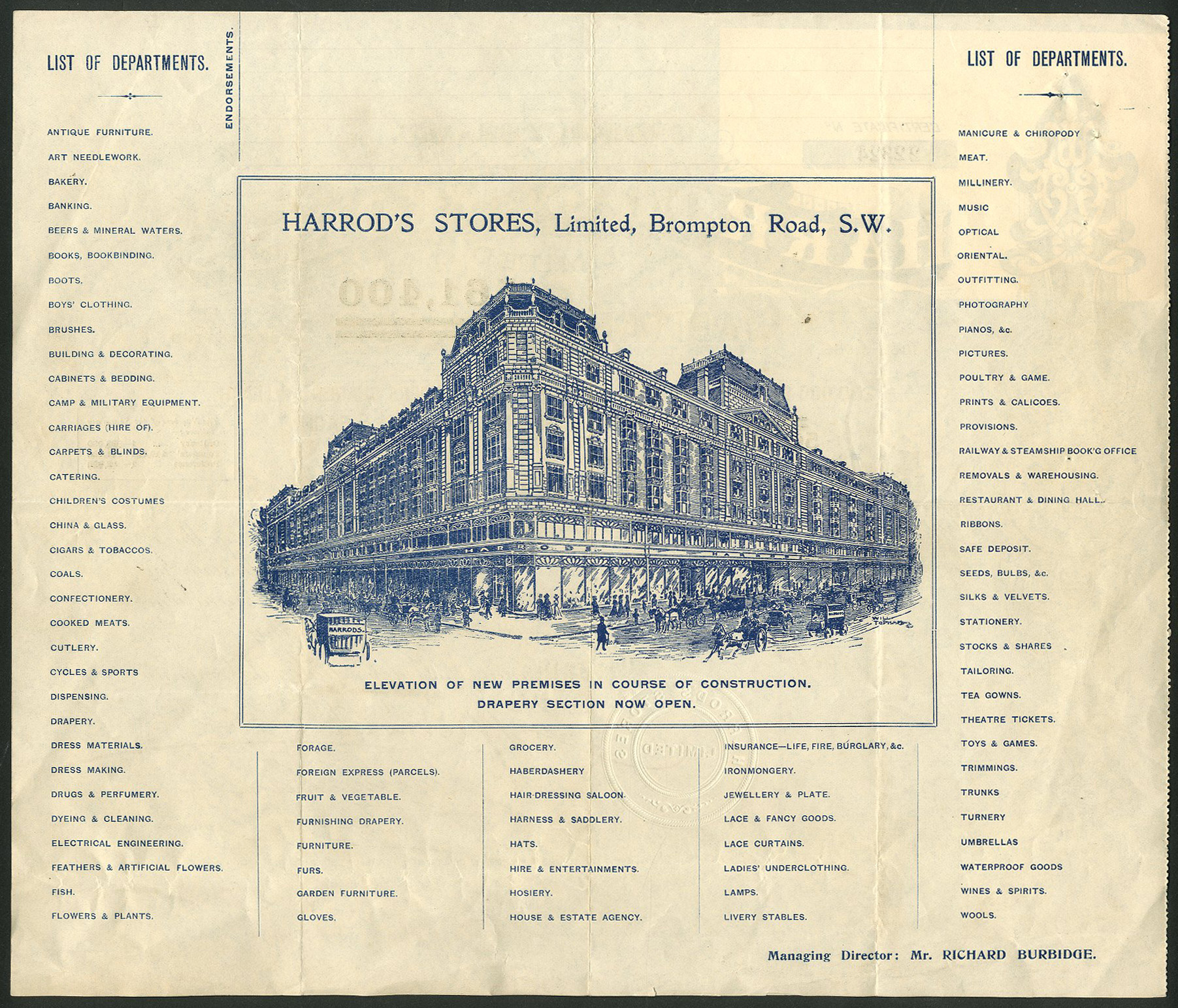
Back of a share from 1903

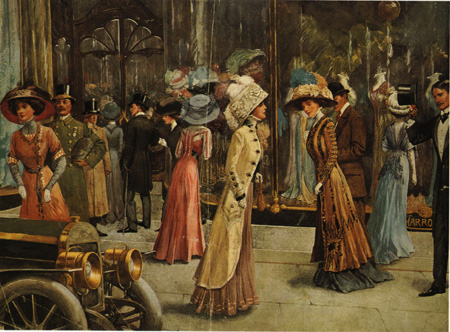
Fashion plate of 1909 showing Londoners walking in front of Harrods

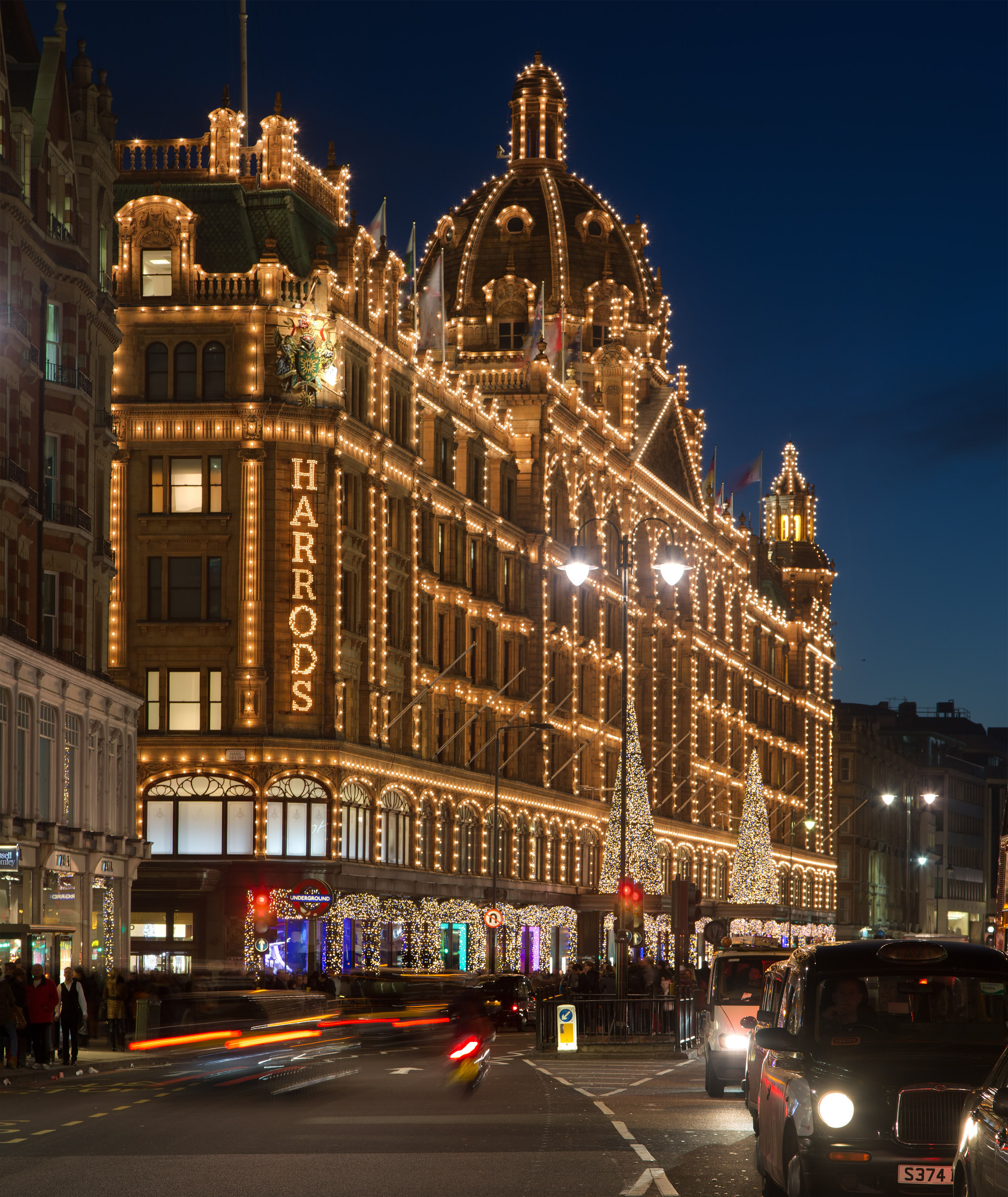
Harrods at night

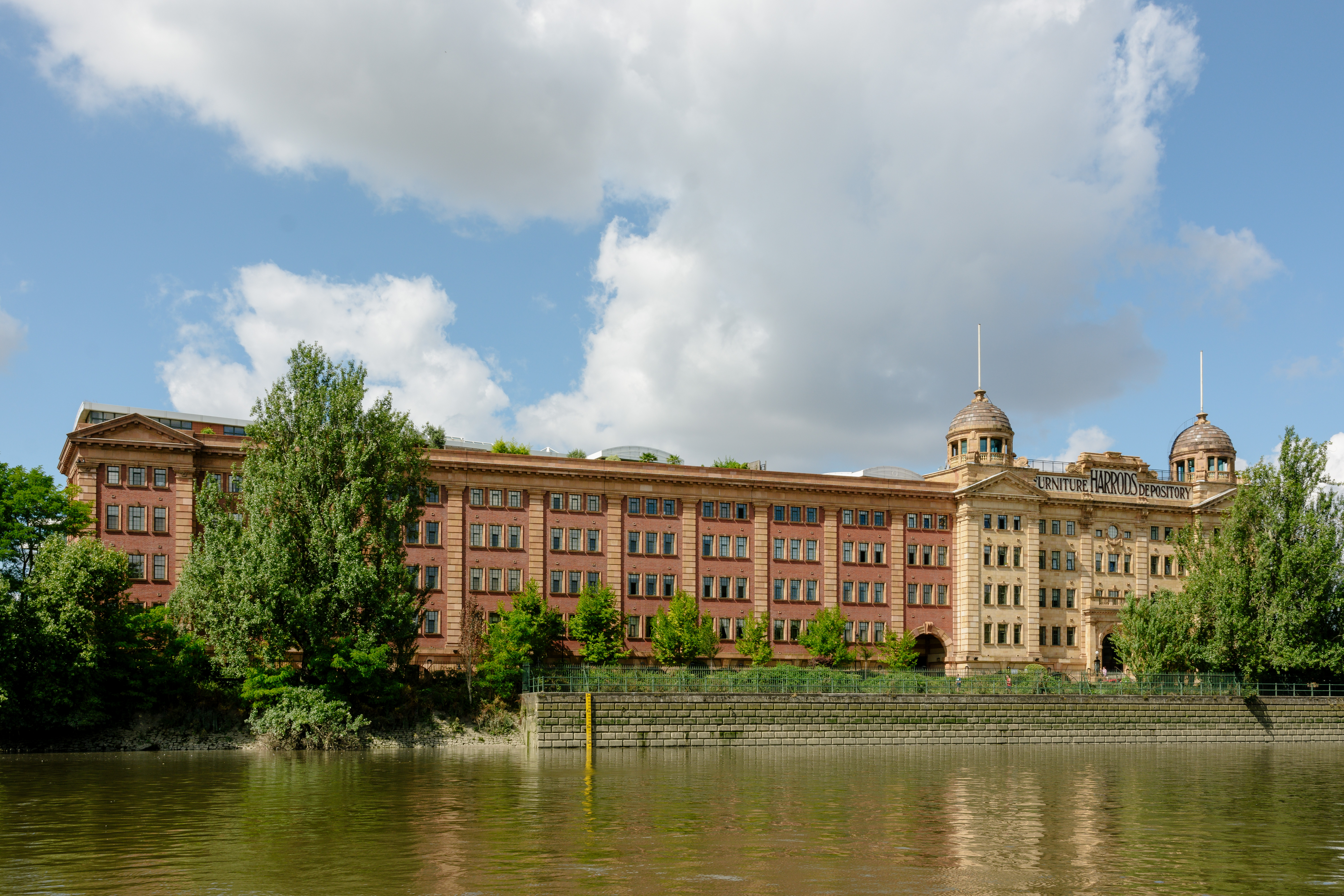
Harrods Furniture Depository in Barnes, London

== See also ==
- Fortnum & Mason
- Jenners, known as the "Harrods of the North"

== Sources ==
- Guinness World Records 2007, published by Guinness (8 August 2006), ISBN 978-1-904994-12-1
