= Burridge Fort =

Iron Age hill fort in Devon, England

Coordinates: 51.088°N 4.038°W

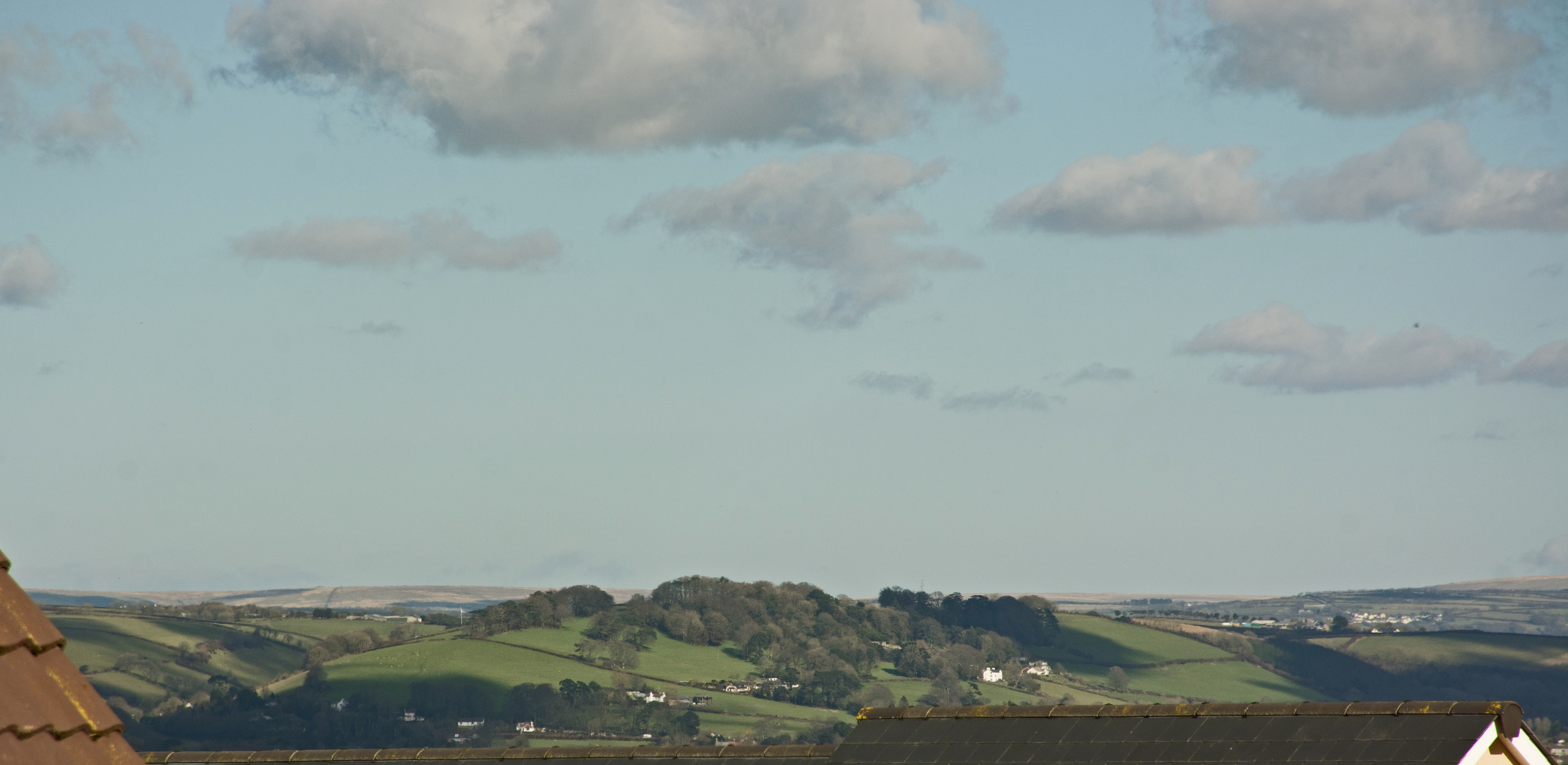
Burridge hill fort

Burridge Fort is an Iron Age Hill fort situated to the North East of Barnstaple in Devon, England. The fort occupies a hill top approx 150 Metres above Sea Level overlooking the Yeo and Bradiford rivers.
