= Charles Henry Harrod =

British businessman

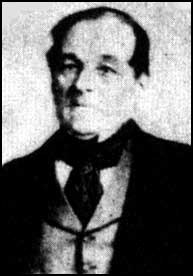
Charles Henry Harrod

Charles Henry Harrod (16 April 1799, Lexden, Colchester – 31 March 1885, Chiswick Urban District) was an English business tycoon, involved in the retail trade. He is known best as the founder of the Harrods Department Store in London, which is known especially for its food halls, sales of luxury foreign foods and its fashion and beauty departments. Harrods also retails its own exclusive brand.

== Early life ==
At a young age, Harrod worked as a miller in Clacton, but in 1834 he relocated to London where he began selling groceries in Stepney.

== Harrods ==
During the 1840s he rented a small shop on Brompton Road, Knightsbridge, which became known as "Harrods". The shop sold groceries and only had a turnover of about £20 per week, during the 1850s when Knightsbridge became one of the most fashionable parts of London.

In 1860 Charles sold the business to his son, Charles Digby Harrod. The trade of Harrods continued to increase and by 1868 the shop had sixteen staff and the turnover had increased to £1,000 per week. Harrod concentrated on encouraging wealthy people to visit his store and provided a personalised service for important customers. He also managed to increase trade by introducing his own brand of groceries packaged in the colours of the Union Flag.
