= Joseph Dimsdale =

British politician

The Right Honourable Sir Joseph Dimsdale Bt KCVO JP DL
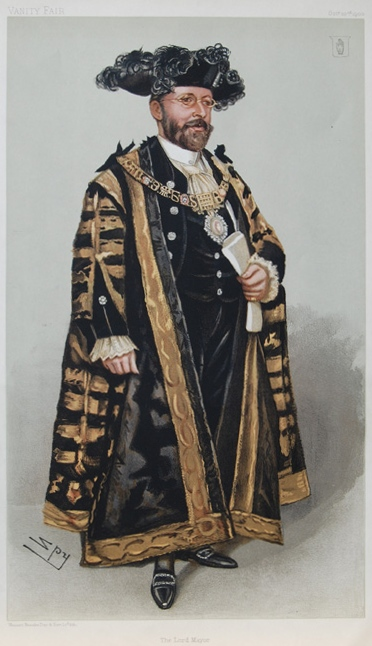
- Dimsdale caricatured by Spy for Vanity Fair, 1902

Lord Mayor of London
- In office 1901–1902

Member of Parliament for City of London
- In office 1900–1906

Personal details
- Born: Joseph Cockfield Dimsdale; 19 January 1849 Cornhill, London, England
- Died: 9 August 1912 (aged 63)

Sir Joseph Cockfield Dimsdale, 1st Baronet (19 January 1849 – 9 August 1912) was a Lord Mayor of London in the coronation year 1902, and a Member of Parliament (MP) for the City of London from 1900 to 1906.

== Early life ==
Dimsdale was born in Cornhill on 19 January 1849, the eldest son of Joseph Cockfield Dimsdale of Cleveland Square, London, and educated at Eton. His father was from an old Quaker family with roots in Essex, and he was related to the physician and politician Thomas Dimsdale (1712-1800).

== Civic career ==
Dimsdale was the Managing Director of Prescott, Dimsdale and Co, bankers. He was a leading member of the Grocers' Company, of which he was for a time Master.

He was Alderman of Cornhill from 1891 to 1902, was elected Sheriff of London for 1893, and Lord Mayor of London in September 1901 (serving November 1901 to November 1902). In the 1900 general election, he was elected as the Member of Parliament (MP) for the City of London, and served one term until 1906.

He was knighted in 1894, in commemoration of the opening of the Tower Bridge and birth of an heir to the Throne while he was Sheriff. In 1902 he carried the Crystal Sceptre of the City of London in front of King Edward VII at his Coronation. The ceremony was rescheduled from June to August, due to the King's illness, but the 1902 Coronation Honours list was released on the intended coronation day on 26 June 1902, and announced that Dimsdale would receive a baronetcy. He was created Baronet, of Goldsmiths, Langdon Hills, in the County of Essex and of Lancaster Street in the Borough of Paddington in the County of London, on 24 July 1902. Later that year he was invested by the King as a Knight Commander of the Royal Victorian Order (KCVO) on 24 October 1902 (gazetted in the November 1902 Birthday Honours list.).

In June 1902 he received the 2nd class of the Japanese Order of the Rising Sun from Prince Komatsu Akihito, who was received formally at Mansion House as part of his visit to the United Kingdom to attend the coronation. Another coronation guest who was formally received by the city was Ras Makonnen, the special envoy of the Emperor of Ethiopia. After his departure from the United Kingdom in August 1902, it was announced that Dimsdale received the 2nd class of the Order of the Star of Ethiopia, and the city a gift of a silver mounted shield, a silver-gilt mounted sword, and an Abyssinian spear to mark the visit.

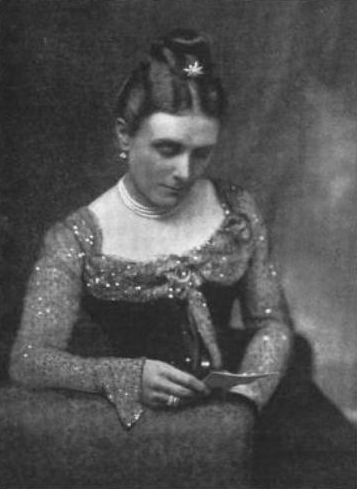
Beatrice Eliza Bower Holdsworth in 1901

During his year as Lord Mayor, he also paid official visits to English cities. He visited Wolverhampton in July 1902, where he received the honorary freedom of the borough in a ceremony attended by the two Sheriffs of the City of London and 20 Mayors from boroughs in the Midlands. In September that year, the Lord Mayor and Sheriffs visited Bath and Exeter.

A Past Grand Warden of the Freemasons of England, he was also an active member of the Primrose League.

He died on 9 August 1912, whilst in the office of Chamberlain of the City of London, a position he had held since being elected unanimously in November 1902.

A portrait of Dimsdale, in his robes of Lord Mayor holding the crystal scepter which he carried at the 1902 coronation, was unveiled at Grocers' Hall in October 1902.

== Family ==
Dimsdale married, in 1873, Beatrice Eliza Bower Holdsworth, daughter of Robert Hunt Holdsworth, of London, and had three children. The eldest son, John Holdsworth Dimsdale (1874-1923), succeeded as 2nd Baronet.

Civic offices
Preceded by Sir Frank Green	573rd Lord Mayor of London; 1901–1902	Succeeded by Sir Marcus Samuel
Parliament of the United Kingdom
Preceded by Sir Reginald Hanson, Bt; Alban Gibbs	Member of Parliament for the City of London; 1900 – 1906; With: Alban Gibbs	Succeeded by Sir Edward Clarke; Arthur Balfour
Baronetage of the United Kingdom
New creation	Baronet (of Goldsmiths and Lancaster Street); 1902–1912	Succeeded by John Holdsworth Dimsdale
