= Burbage (surname) =

Burbage is a surname. Notable people with the surname include:

- Cornell Burbage (born 1965), American football player and coach
- Cuthbert Burbage (c. 1565–1636), English stage actor and brother of Richard Burbage
- Jake Burbage (born 1992), American actor and writer
- James Burbage (c. 1531–1597), English actor and stage builder, father of Richard and Cuthbert Burbage
- Jesse Burbage (1894–1957), American basketball player
- Richard Burbage (c. 1567–1619), English stage actor and brother of Cuthbert Burbage

Fictional characters:

- Charity Burbage, minor fictional character in the Harry Potter books
