= Burbidge baronets =

Baronetcy in the Baronetage of the United Kingdom

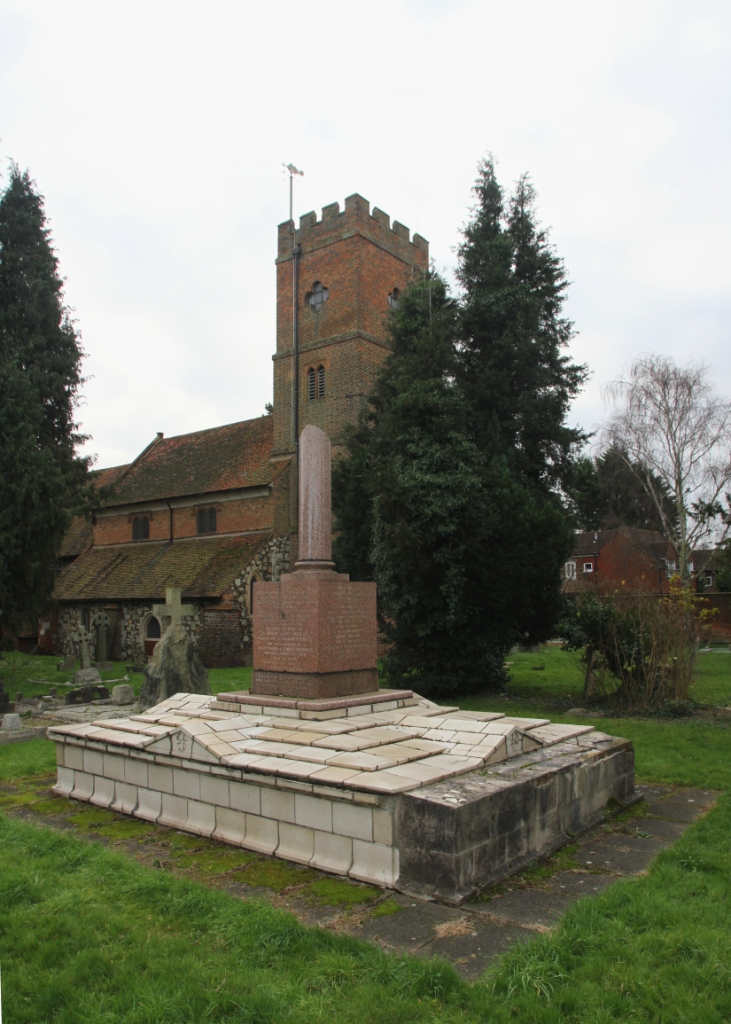
Burbidge family tomb in St Mary Magdalene parish churchyard, Littleton, Middlesex. The tomb had a neoclassical entrance building, but this became structurally unsafe and was demolished in 1953.

The Burbidge Baronetcy, of Littleton Park in the County of Middlesex, is a title in the Baronetage of the United Kingdom. It was created on 25 January 1916 for Richard Burbidge, who was managing director of Harrods from 1890 to 1917.

He was succeeded by his eldest son, the second Baronet, who also was chairman of Harrods. His son, the third Baronet, was chairman and managing director of Harrods. His son, the fourth Baronet, had no issue and on his early death in 1974, he was succeeded by his first cousin once removed, the fifth Baronet. He was the son of Herbert Edward Burbidge, second son of the first Baronet. As of 2022, the title is held by his grandson, the seventh Baronet, who succeeded in 2019.

== Burbidge baronets, of Littleton Park (1916) ==
- Sir Richard Burbidge, 1st Baronet (1847–1917)
- Sir (Richard) Woodman Burbidge, 2nd Baronet (1872–1945)
- Sir Richard Grant Woodman Burbidge, 3rd Baronet (1897–1966)
- Sir John Richard Woodman Burbidge, 4th Baronet (1930–74)
- Sir (Herbert) Dudley Burbidge, 5th Baronet (1904–2001)
- Sir Peter Dudley Burbidge, 6th Baronet (1942–2019)
- Sir John Peter Burbidge, 7th Baronet (born 1975)
