= Richard Burbidge =

Sir Richard Burbidge, 1st Baronet (2 March 1847 – 31 May 1917) was an English merchant.

== Biography ==
He was born in Wiltshire, educated at Devizes and Melksham, and at the age of 13 was apprenticed to a provision merchant in Oxford Street, London, afterwards starting in business as a provision merchant at the age of 19. Fourteen years later he became general superintendent of the Army and Navy Auxiliary Stores. In 1882 he was appointed general manager of Whiteley's, Westbourne Grove, and in 1891 entered the service of Harrods, Brompton Road, of which he was afterwards managing director. By 1916, he had increased its profits from £16,000 to over £200,000, and it had become one of the largest of the London stores. He also did a good deal to ensure shorter working hours for shop assistants.

Burbidge was the “private citizen” who anonymously presented about £30,000 to the fund for acquiring the Crystal Palace for the public in 1913. During World War I, he was responsible for the building and fitting up of two hospitals in Belgium, and was a member of many government committees, including the advisory committee of the Ministry of Munitions and the committee of inquiry into the Royal Aircraft workings, of which he was chairman.

He was created a baronet in 1916 (see Burbidge baronets). He died in London.

== Gallery ==
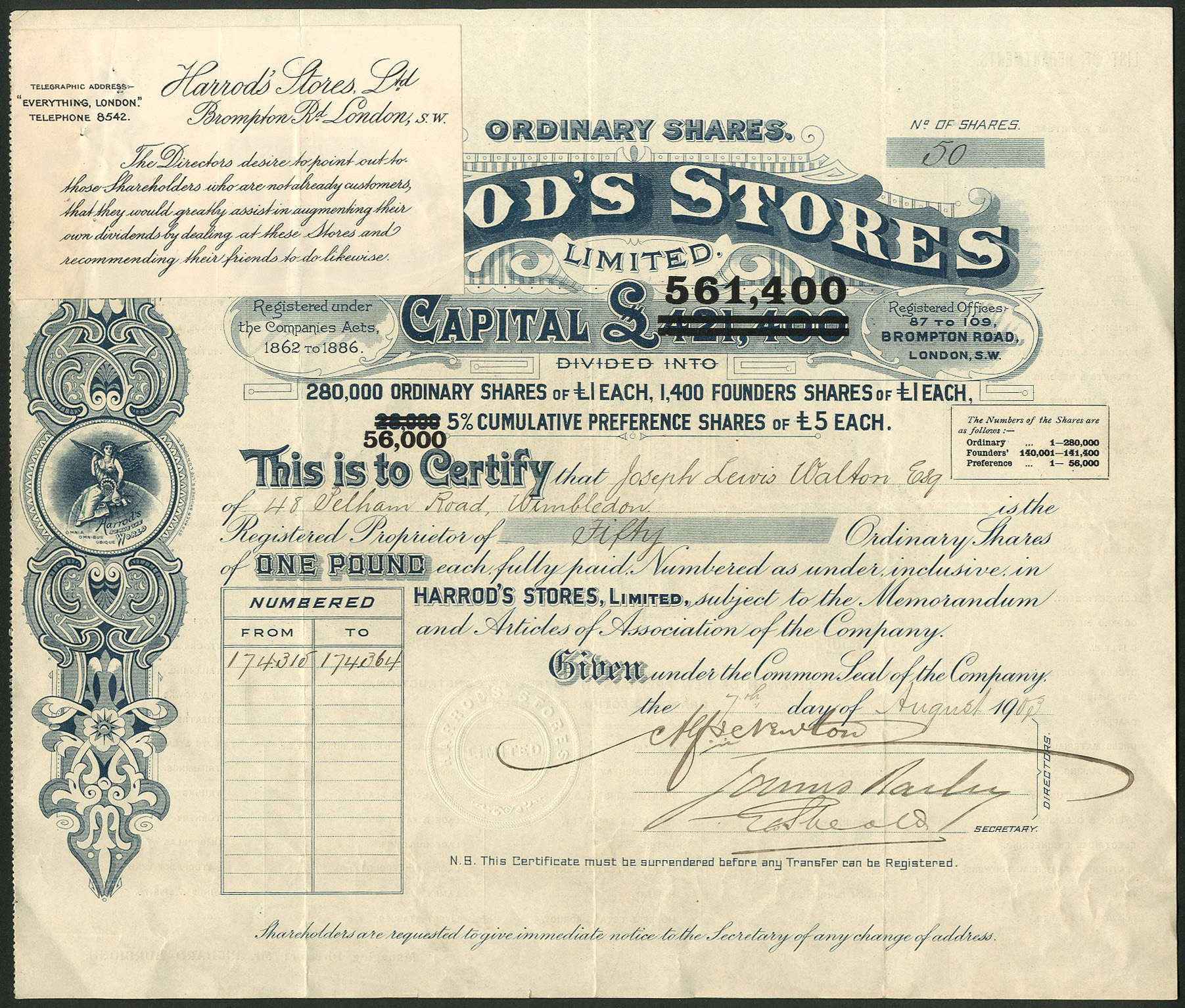
Share of the Harrod's Stores Ltd., issued 7 August 1903

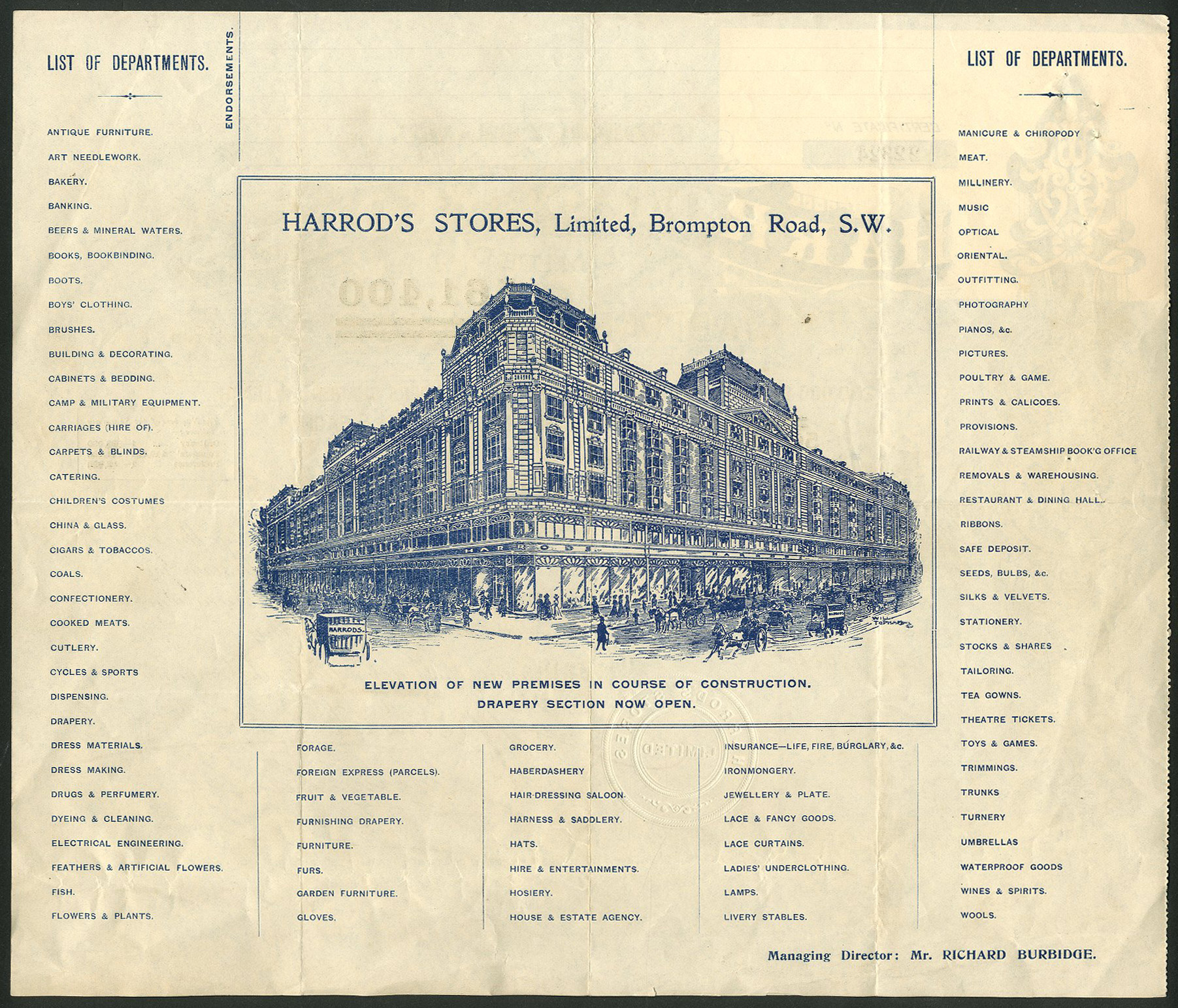
Back of a share from 1903, Richard Burbidge is mentioned as the Managing Director of the Harrod's Stores.

== Notes ==
Baronetage of the United Kingdom
New creation	Baronet (of Littleton Park); 1916–1917	Succeeded by Woodman Burbidge
