= Frederick Burbidge (cricketer) =

English cricketer

Frederick Burbidge (23 November 1832 – 12 December 1892) was an English first-class cricketer active 1854–68 who played for Surrey. He was born in Champion Hill, London and died in Rickmansworth. The captain of Surrey from 1858 to 1865, he played in 64 first-class matches. He was a righthanded batsman who scored 1,475 career runs with a highest score of 101 and held 58 catches.
