= Charles Digby Harrod =

British businessman (1841–1905)

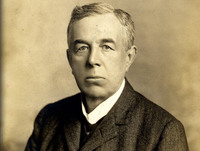
- Charles Digby Harrod
- Born: 25 January 1841
- Died: 15 August 1905 (aged 64)
- Occupation: Businessman
- Known for: Harrods Department Store
- Parent: Charles Henry Harrod (father)

Charles Digby Harrod (25 January 1841 – 15 August 1905) was an English businessman who expanded Harrods in London into a department store after his father, Charles Henry Harrod had retired.
