= Ornament (art) =

Decoration used to embellish parts of a building or object

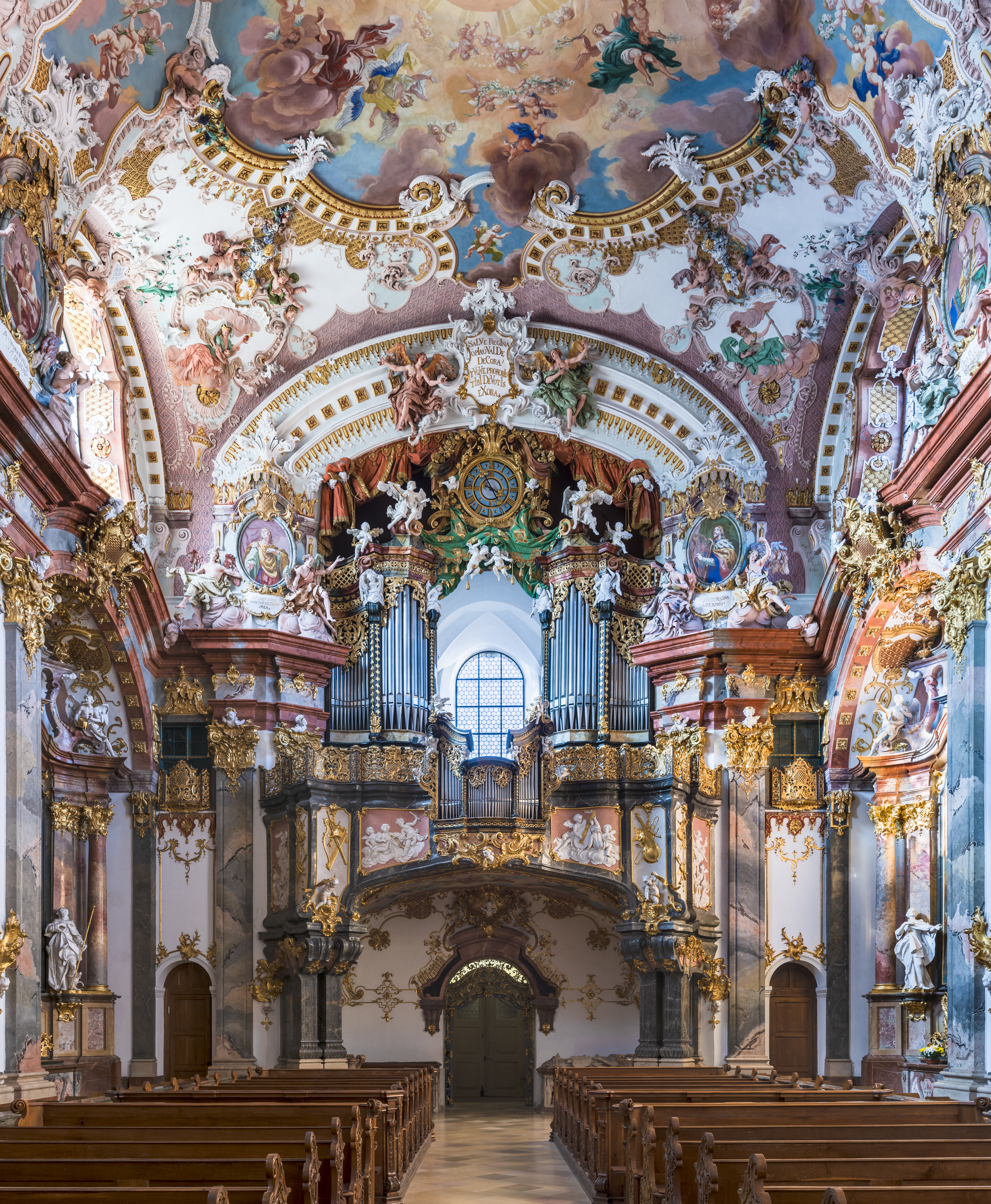
Rococo interior of the Wilhering Abbey (Wilhering, Austria), with a trompe-l'œil painted ceiling, surrounded by highly decorated stucco

In architecture and decorative art, ornament is decoration used to embellish parts of a building or object. Large figurative elements such as monumental sculpture and their equivalents in decorative art are excluded from the term; most ornaments do not include human figures, and if present they are small compared to the overall scale. Architectural ornament can be carved from stone, wood or precious metals, formed with plaster or clay, or painted or impressed onto a surface as applied ornament; in other applied arts the main material of the object, or a different one such as paint or vitreous enamel may be used.

A wide variety of decorative styles and motifs have been developed for architecture and the applied arts, including pottery, furniture, metalwork. In textiles, wallpaper and other objects where the decoration may be the main justification for its existence, the terms pattern or design are more likely to be used. The vast range of motifs used in ornament draw from geometrical shapes and patterns, plants, and human and animal figures. Across Eurasia and the Mediterranean world there has been a rich and linked tradition of plant-based ornament for over three thousand years; traditional ornament from other parts of the world typically relies more on geometrical and animal motifs. The inspiration for the patterns usually lies in the nature that surrounds the people in the region. Many nomadic tribes in Central Asia had many animalistic motifs before the penetration of Islam in the region.

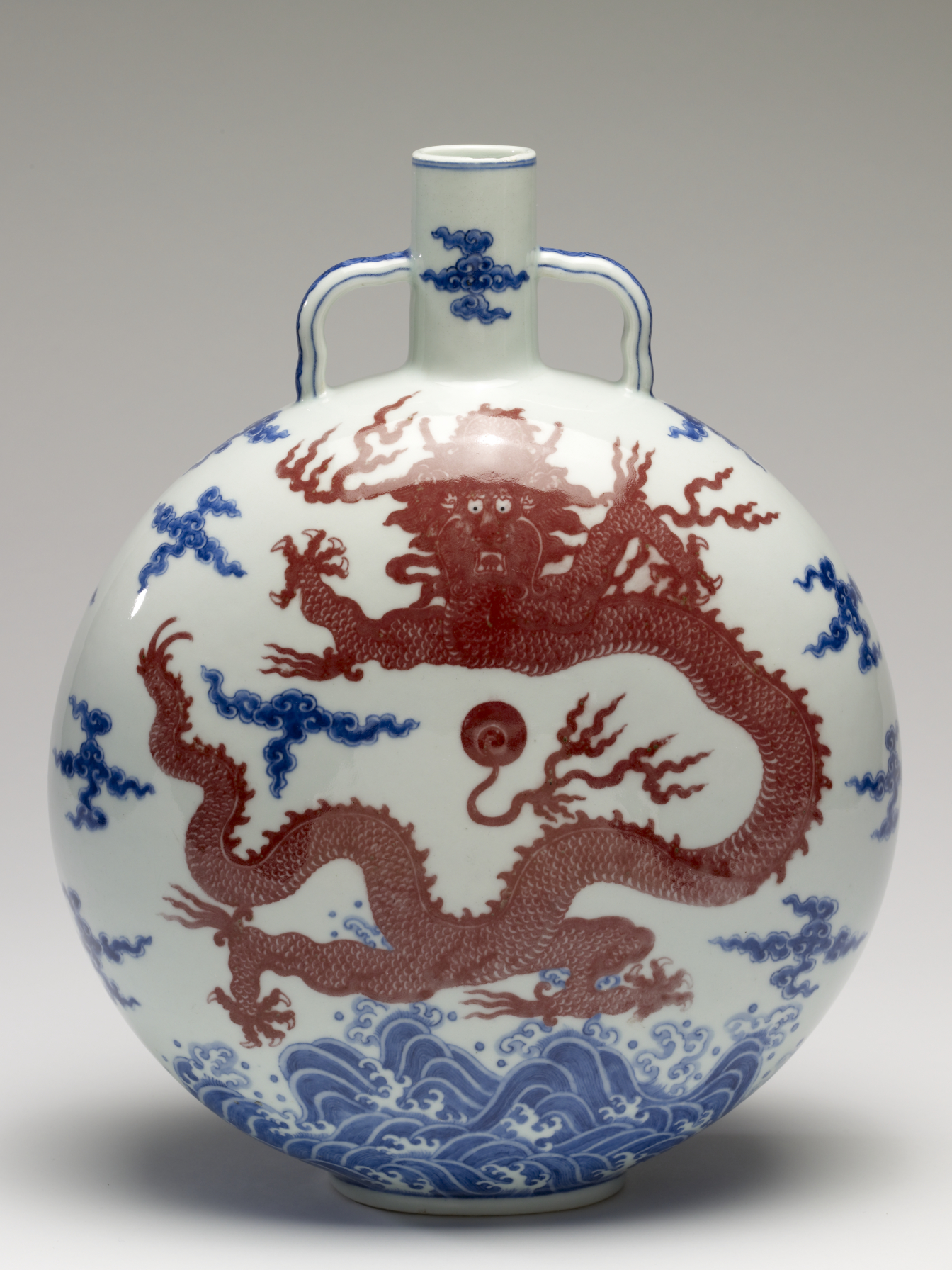
Chinese flask decorated with a dragon, clouds and some waves, an example of Jingdezhen porcelain

In a 1941 essay, the architectural historian Sir John Summerson called it "surface modulation". The earliest decoration and ornament often survives from prehistoric cultures in simple markings on pottery, where decoration in other materials (including tattoos) has been lost. Where the potter's wheel was used, the technology made some kinds of decoration very easy; weaving is another technology which also lends itself very easily to decoration or pattern, and to some extent dictates its form. Ornament has been evident in civilizations since the beginning of recorded history, ranging from Ancient Egyptian architecture to the assertive lack of ornament of 20th century Modernist architecture. Ornaments also depict a certain philosophy of the people for the world around. For example, in Central Asia among nomadic Kazakhs, the circular lines of the ornaments signalled the sequential perception of time in the wide steppes and the breadth and freedom of space.

Ornament implies that the ornamented object has a function that an unornamented equivalent might also fulfill. Where the object has no such function, but exists only to be a work of art such as a sculpture or painting, the term is less likely to be used, except for peripheral elements. In recent centuries a distinction between the fine arts and applied or decorative arts has been applied (except for architecture), with ornament mainly seen as a feature of the latter class.

== History ==
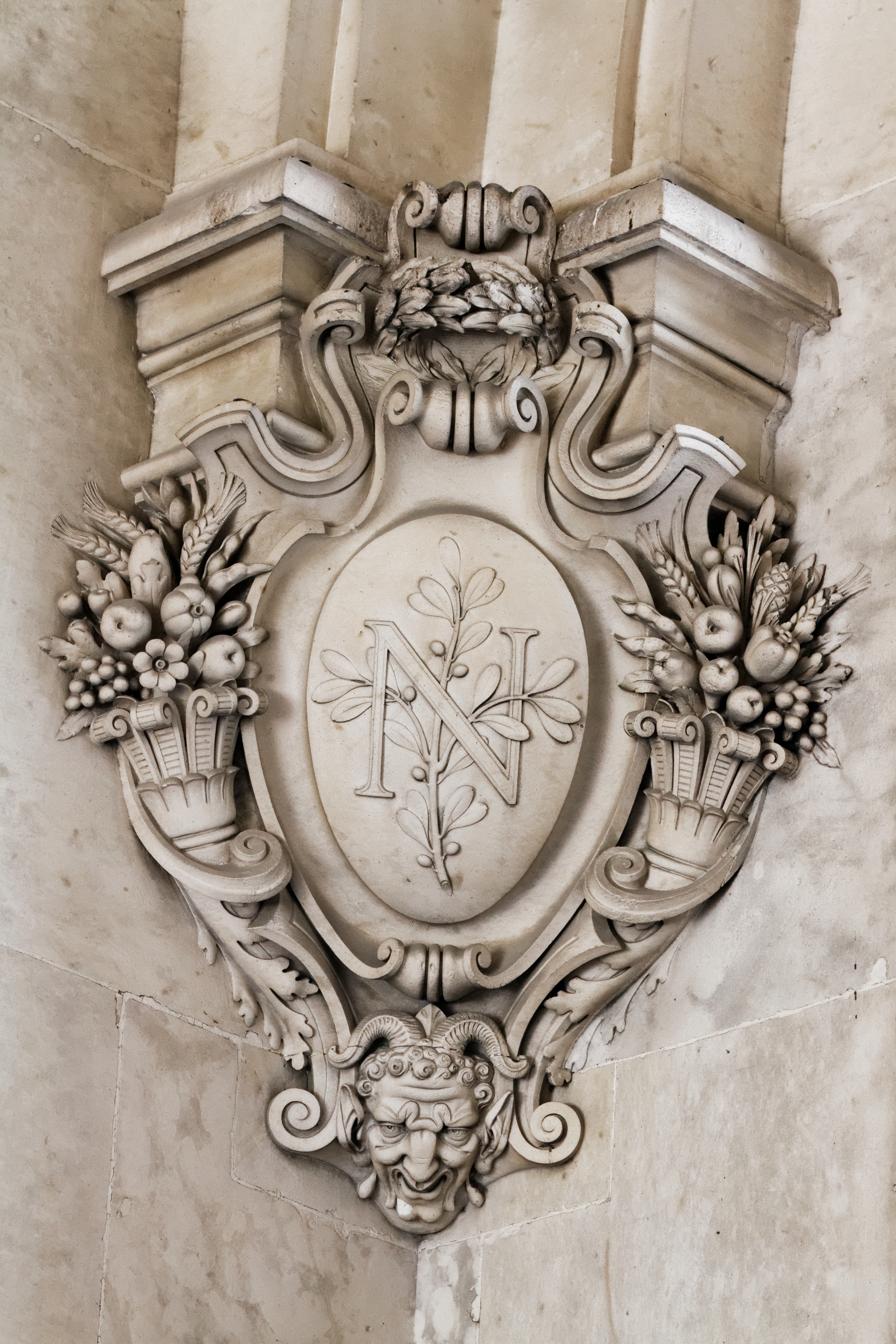
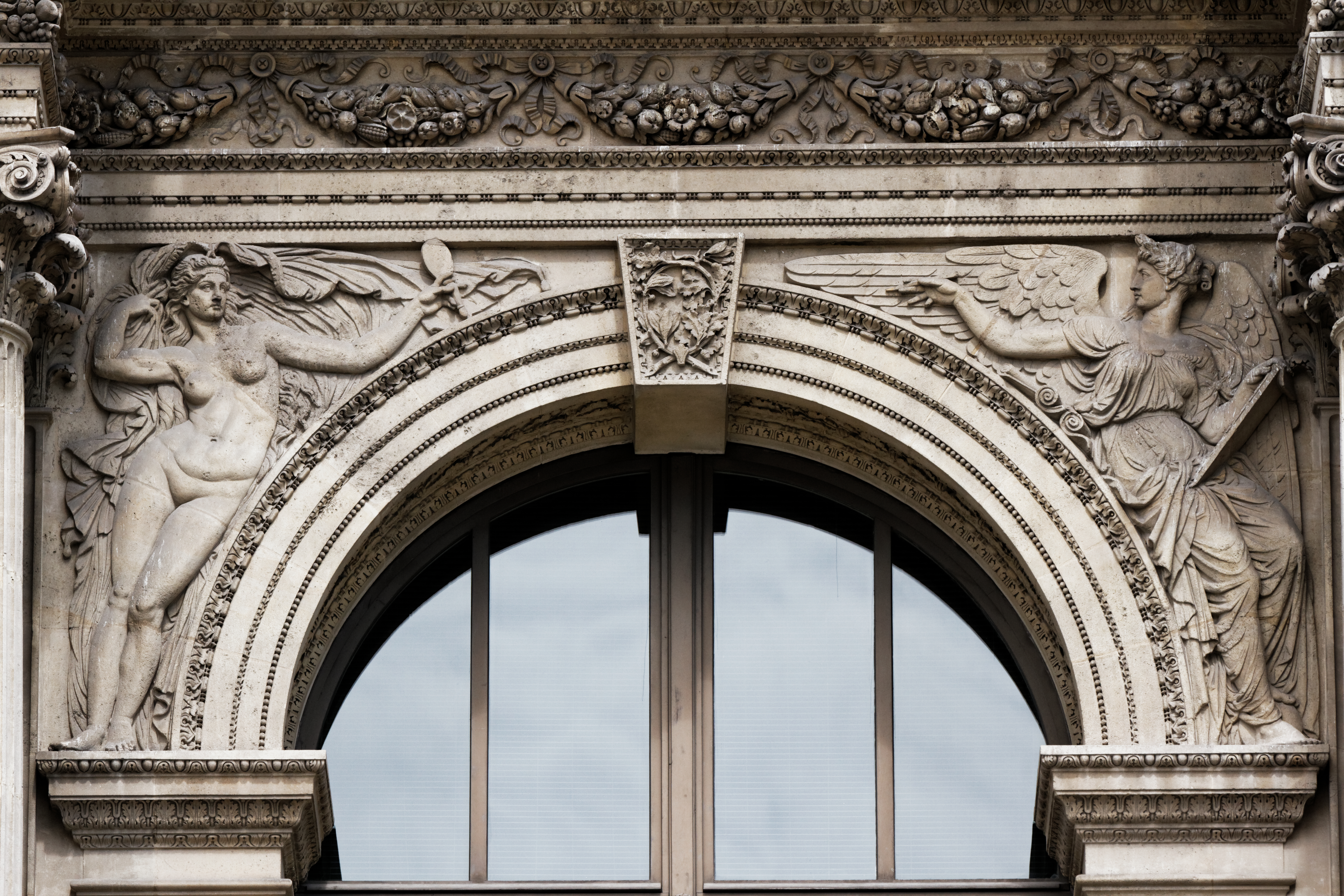
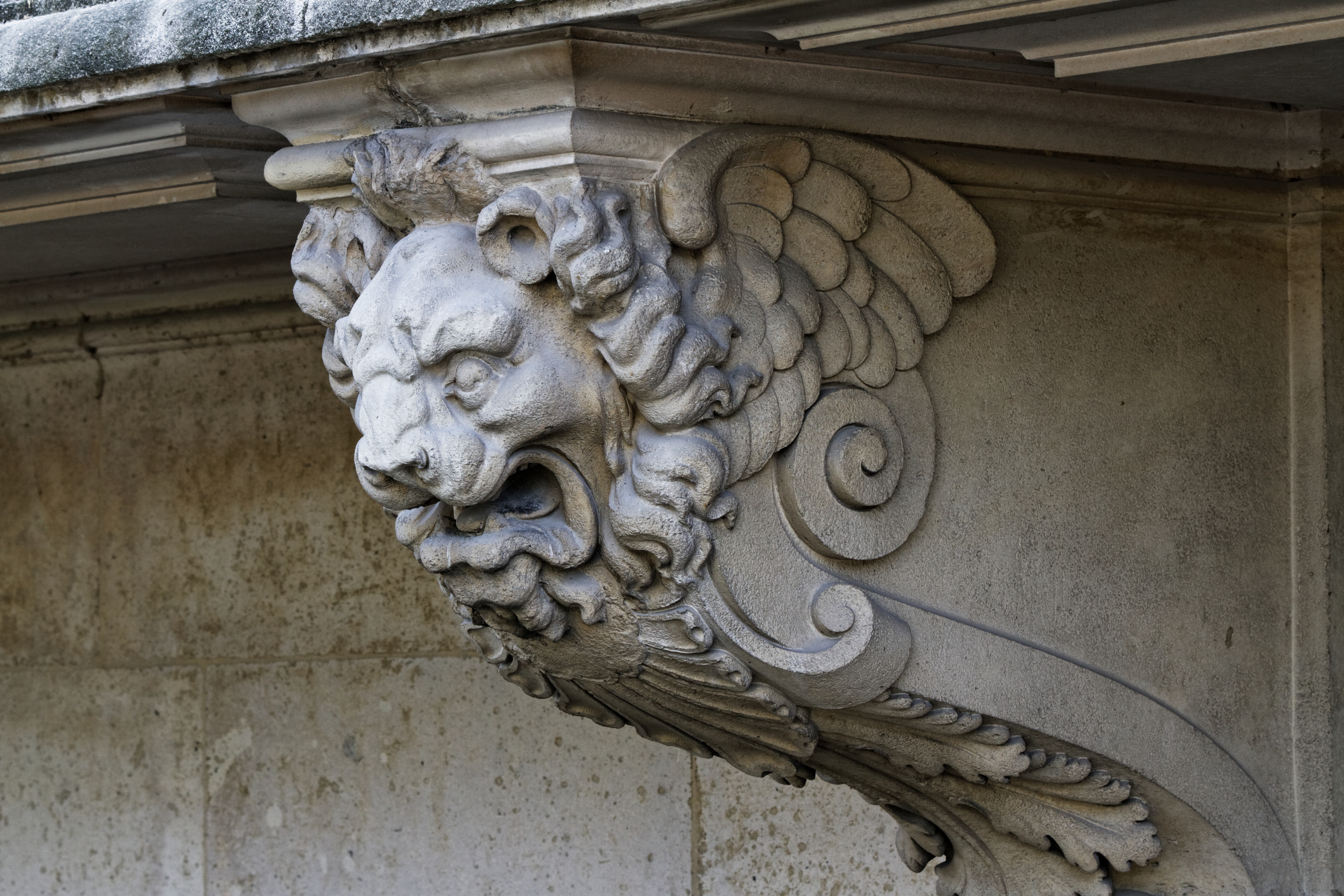
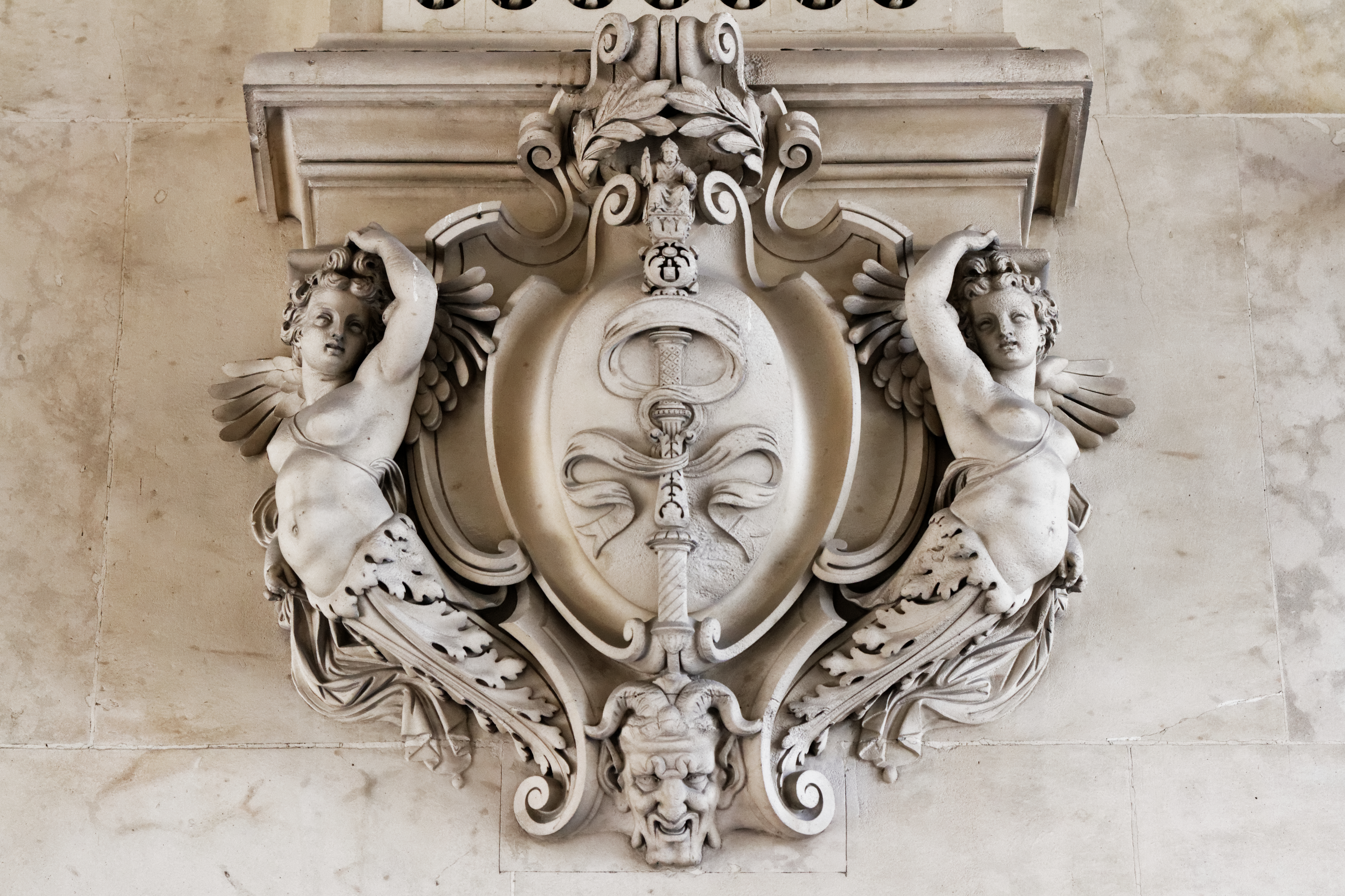
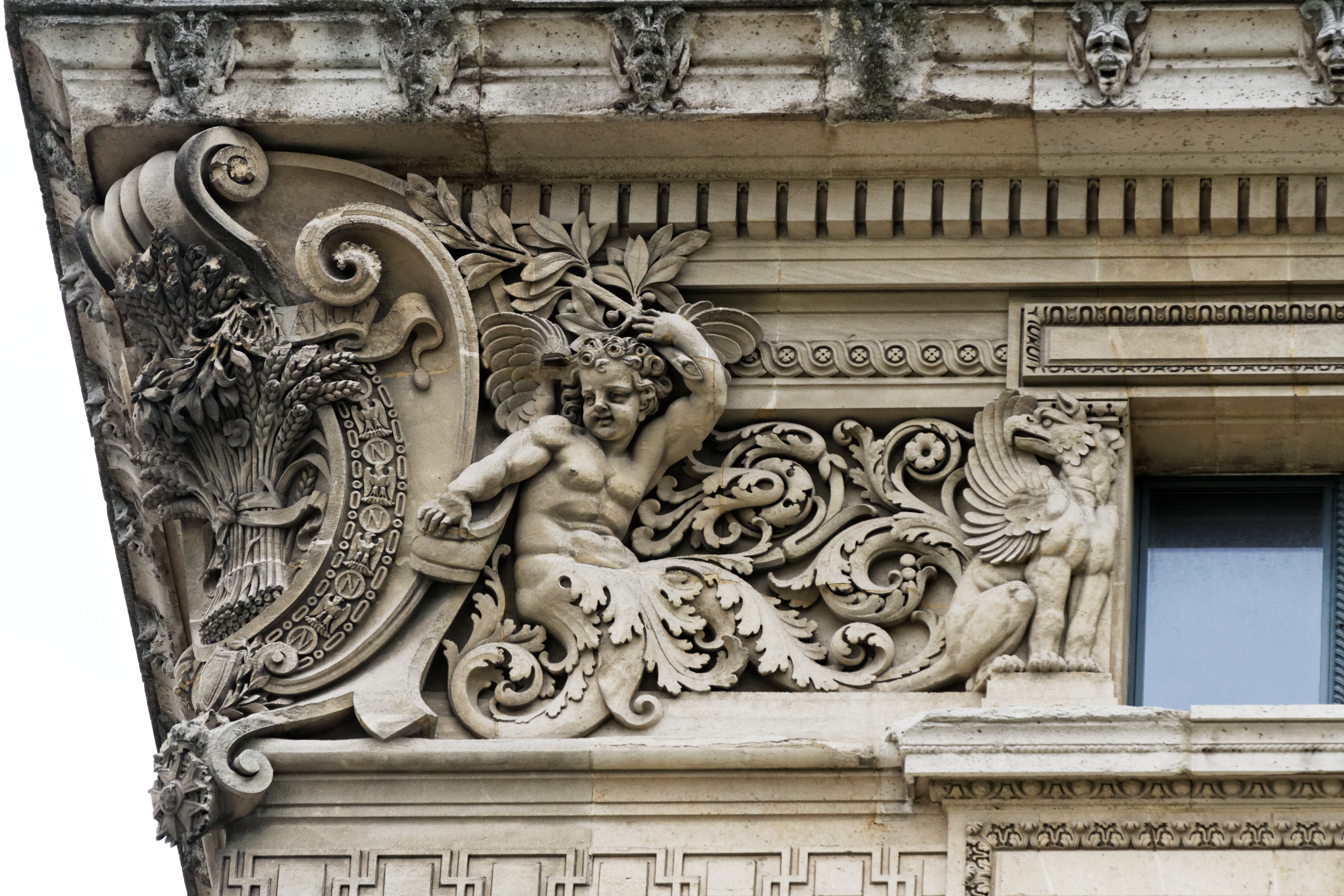
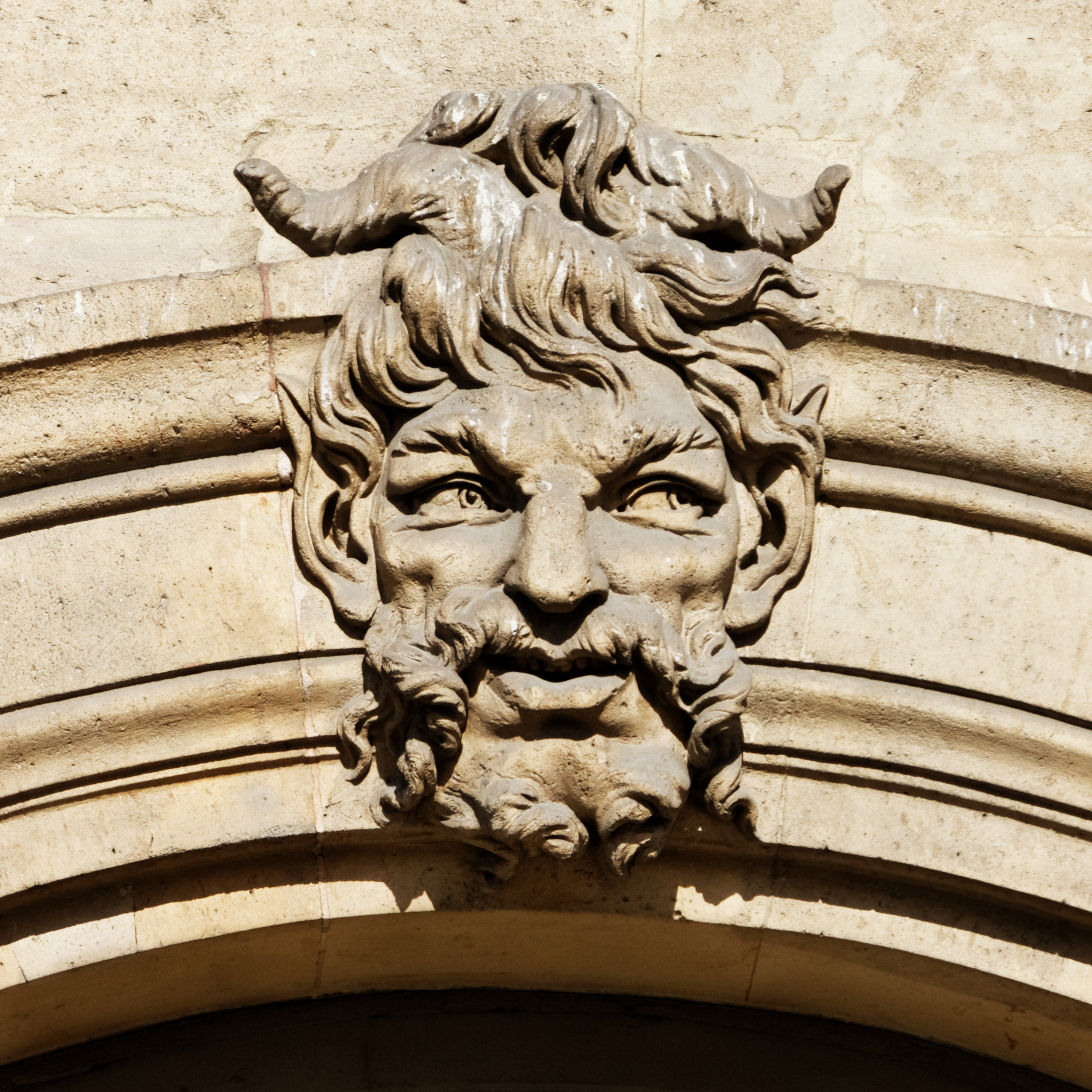
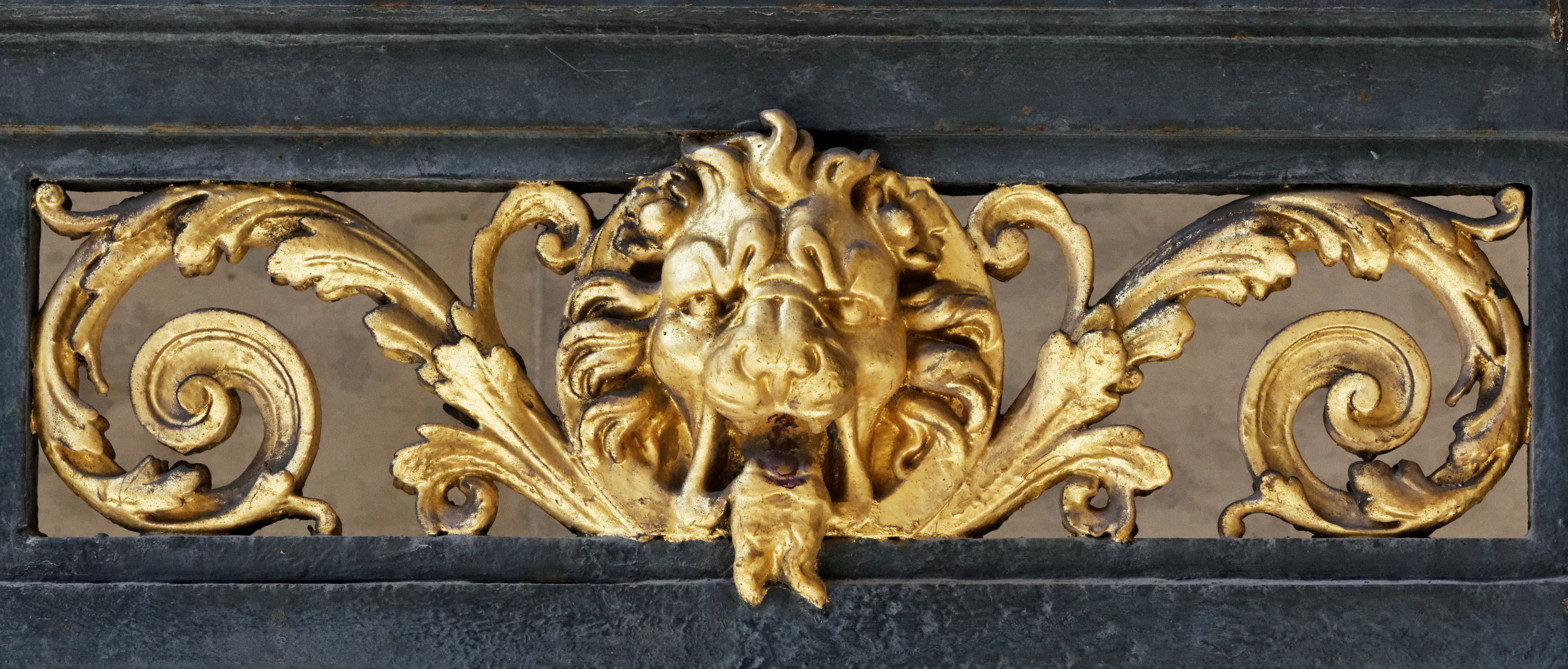
Various architectural ornaments on the façades of the Louvre

The history of art in many cultures shows a series of wave-like trends where the level of ornament used increases over a period, before a sharp reaction returns to plainer forms, after which ornamentation gradually increases again. The pattern is especially clear in post-Roman European art, where the highly ornamented Insular art of the Book of Kells and other manuscripts influenced continental Europe, but the classically inspired Carolingian and Ottonian art largely replaced it. Ornament increased over the Romanesque and Gothic periods, but was greatly reduced in Early Renaissance styles, again under classical influence. Another period of increase, in Northern Mannerism, the Baroque and Rococo, was checked by Neoclassicism and the Romantic period. Ornament in male clothing went out of fashion around 1800, in the Great Male Renunciation. Ornament in architecture and furniture resumed in the later-19th century Napoleon III style, Victorian decorative arts and their equivalents in other countries, to be decisively reduced by the Arts and Crafts movement and then by Modernism.

The detailed study of Eurasian ornamental forms was begun by Alois Riegl in his formalist study Stilfragen: Grundlegungen zu einer Geschichte der Ornamentik (Problems of style: foundations for a history of ornament) of 1893; in the process Riegl developed his influential concept of the Kunstwollen. Riegl traced formalistic continuity and development in decorative plant-forms from Ancient Egyptian art and other ancient Near Eastern civilizations through the classical world to the arabesque of Islamic art. While the concept of the Kunstwollen has few followers today, his basic analysis of the development of forms has been confirmed and refined by the wider corpus of examples known today. Jessica Rawson has recently extended the analysis to cover Chinese art, which Riegl did not include, tracing many elements of Chinese decoration back to the same tradition; the shared background helping to make the assimilation of Chinese motifs into Persian art after the Mongol invasion harmonious and productive.

Styles of ornamentation can be studied in reference to the specific culture which developed unique forms of decoration, or modified ornament from other cultures. The Ancient Egyptian culture was arguably the first civilization to add pure decoration to its buildings. Egyptian ornament takes the forms of the natural world in the Egyptian climate, decorating the capitals of columns and walls with images of papyrus and palm trees. Assyrian culture produced ornament which shows influence from Egyptian sources and a number of original themes, including figures of plants and animals of the Assyrian region.

The Ancient Greek civilization created many new forms of ornament, which diffused across Eurasia, helped by the conquests of Alexander the Great and by the expansion of Buddhism, which took some motifs to East Asia in somewhat modified form. In the West the Ancient Roman Latinized forms of Greek ornament lasted for around a millennium, and after a lengthy period when they were replaced by Gothic forms, powerfully revived in the Italian Renaissance and remain extremely widely used today.

== Roman ornament ==
Ornament in the Roman empire utilized a diverse array of styles and materials, including marble, glass, obsidian, and gold. Roman ornament, specifically in the context of Pompeii, has been studied and written about by scholar Jessica Powers in her book chapter "Beyond Painting in Pompeii's Houses: Wall Ornaments and Their Patrons." Instead of studying ornamental objects in isolation, Powers argues that, if the information is provided, objects must be approached in their original context. This information might include the location where the work was found, other objects located or found nearby, or who the patron was who might have commissioned the work. Jessica Powers' chapter primarily discusses the Casa Degli Amorini Dorati in Pompeii, where 18 wall ornaments were found, the most of any Pompeiian home. Interior wall ornament in a Pompeian home would typically divide the wall into three or more sections under which there would be a dado taking up roughly one-sixth of the height of the wall. The wall sections would be divided by broad pilasters connected by a frieze which bands across the top of the wall. The ornament found at the Casa Degli Amorini Dorati in Pompeii reflected this standard style and included objects that had clearly been reused, and rare and imported objects. Several of the panels on the walls of the Casa Degli Amorini Dorati were removed during archeological work in the 1970s, revealing that the panels had been stuck on different walls before the one on which they were found. Jessica Powers argues that these panels illustrate the home owner and correlating patrons' willingness to utilize damaged or secondhand materials in their own home. Moreover, the materials used in the decorative wall panels were identified as being from the Greek East or Egypt, not from Pompeii. This points to the elaborate trade routes that flourished across the Roman Empire, and that home owners were interested in using materials from outside of Pompeii to embellish their homes.

In addition to homes, public buildings and temples are locations where Roman ornament styles were on display. In the Roman temple, the extravagant use of ornament served as a means of self-glorification, as scholar Owen Jones notes in his book chapter, Roman Ornament. Roman ornament techniques include surface-modeling, where ornamental styles are applied onto a surface. This was a common ornamental style with marble surfaces. One common ornamental style was the use of acanthus leaf, a motif adopted from the Greeks. The use of acanthus leaf and other naturalist motifs can be seen in Corinthian capitals, in temples, and in other public sites.

== Ornament prints and pattern books ==
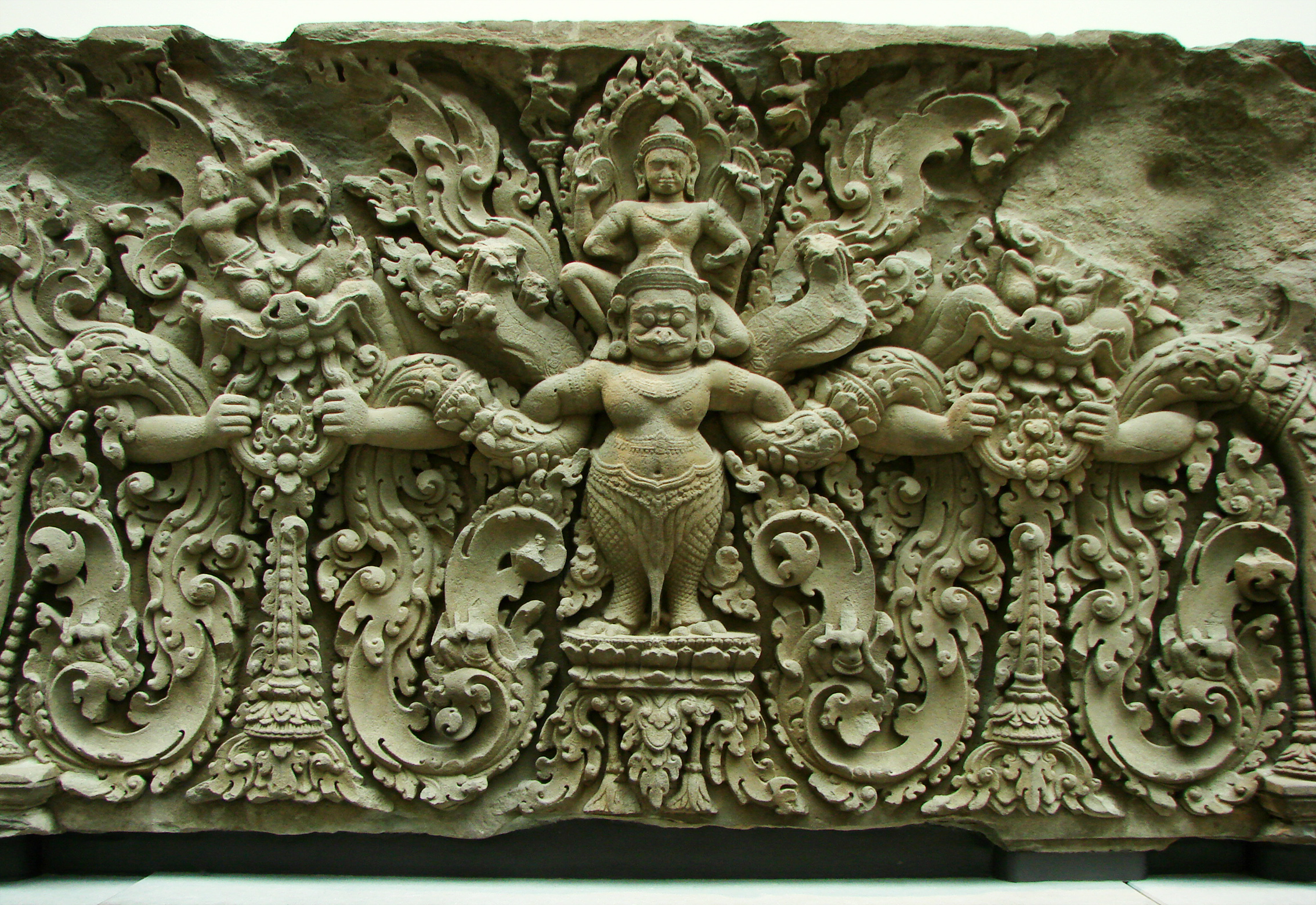
Khmer lintel in Preah Ko, (east of Angkor, Cambodia) style, late 9th century, reminiscent of later European scrollwork styles

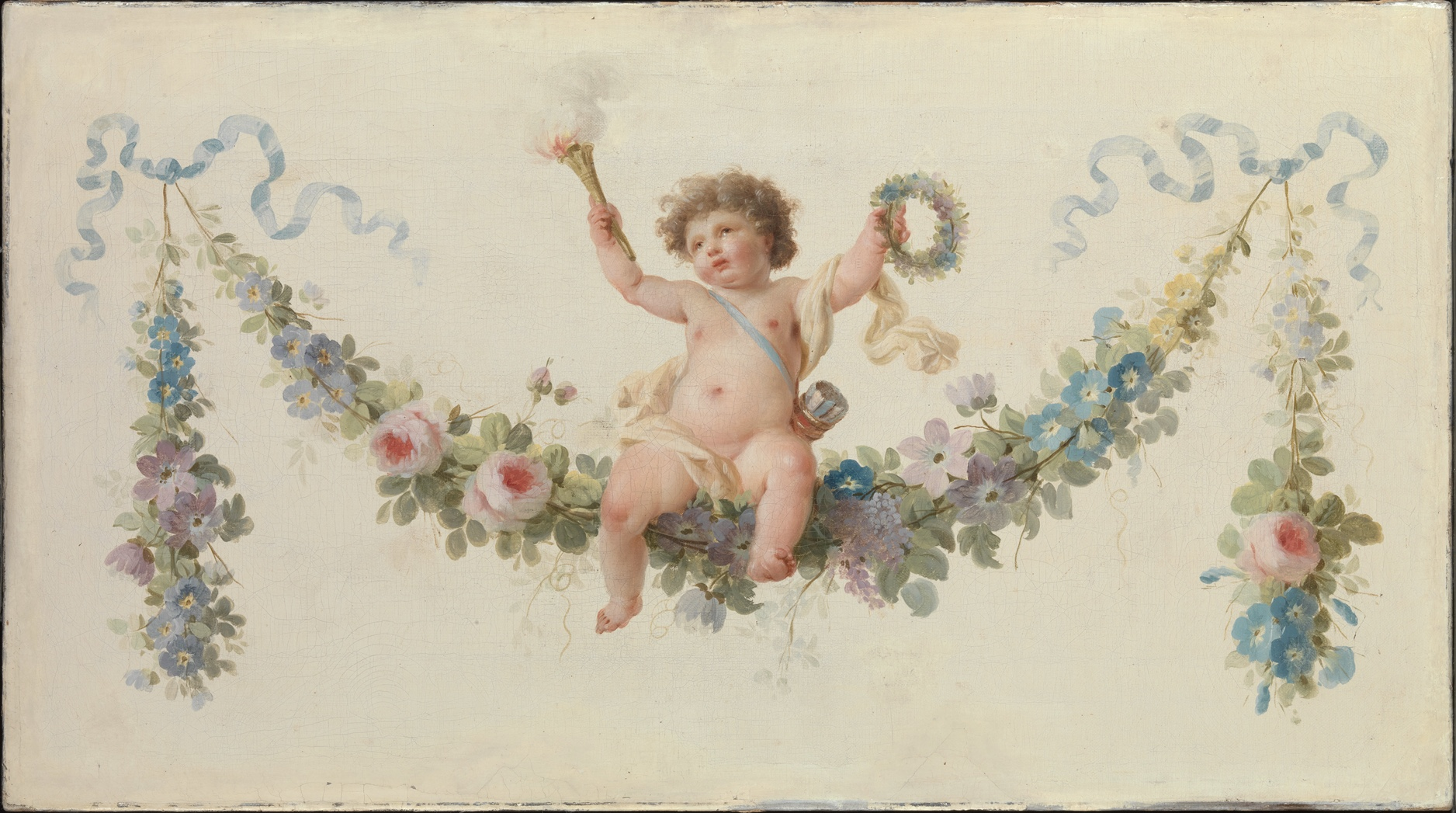
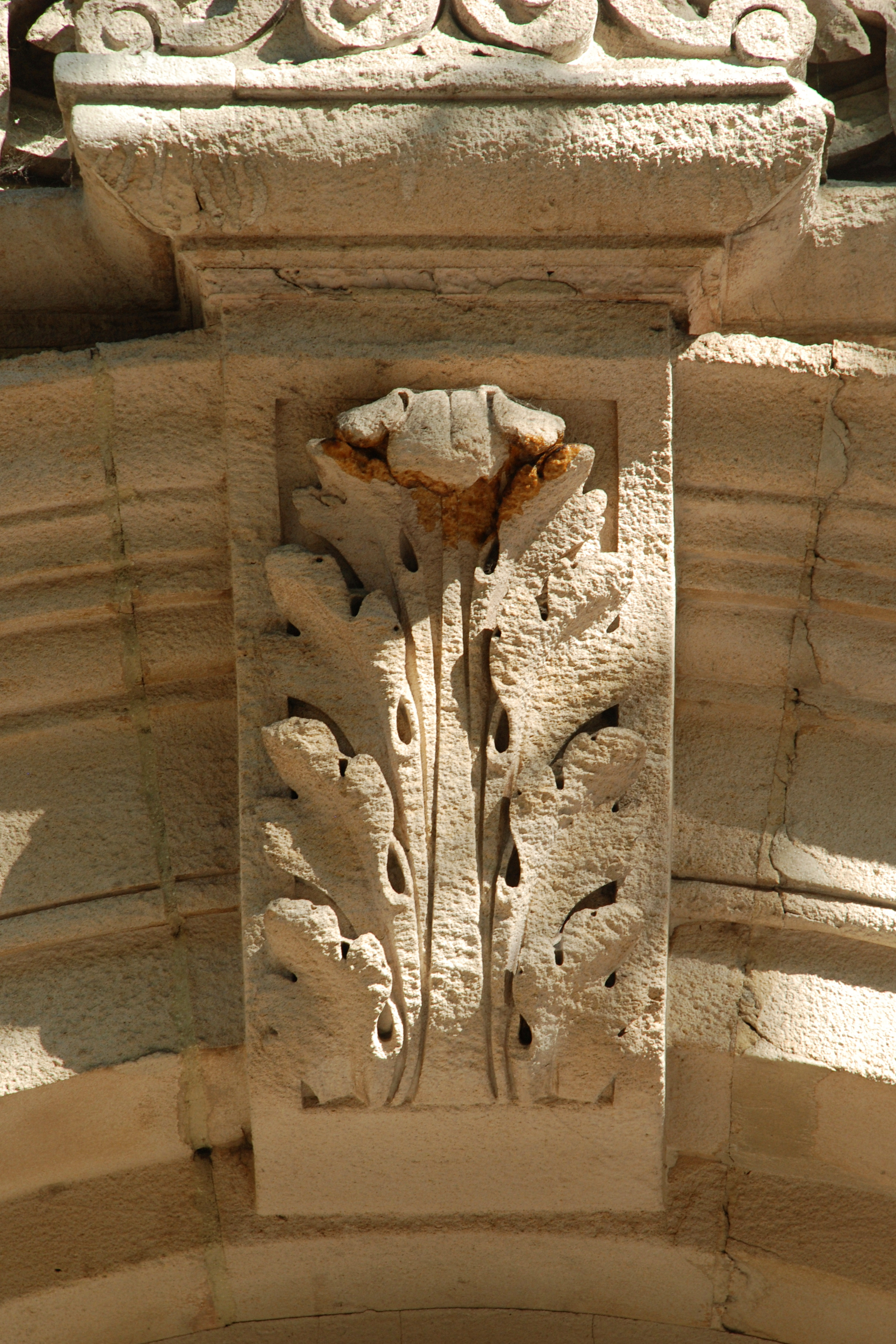
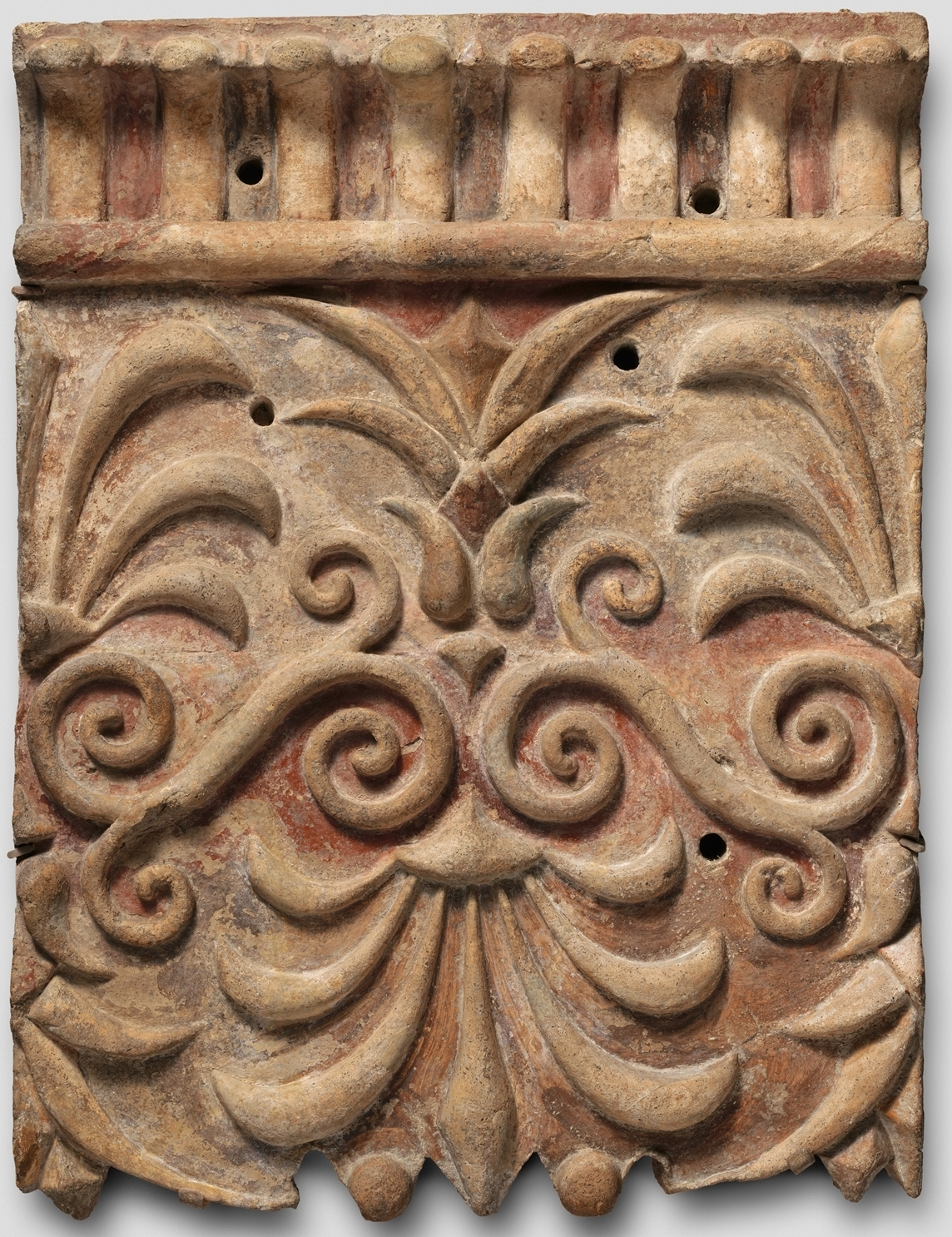
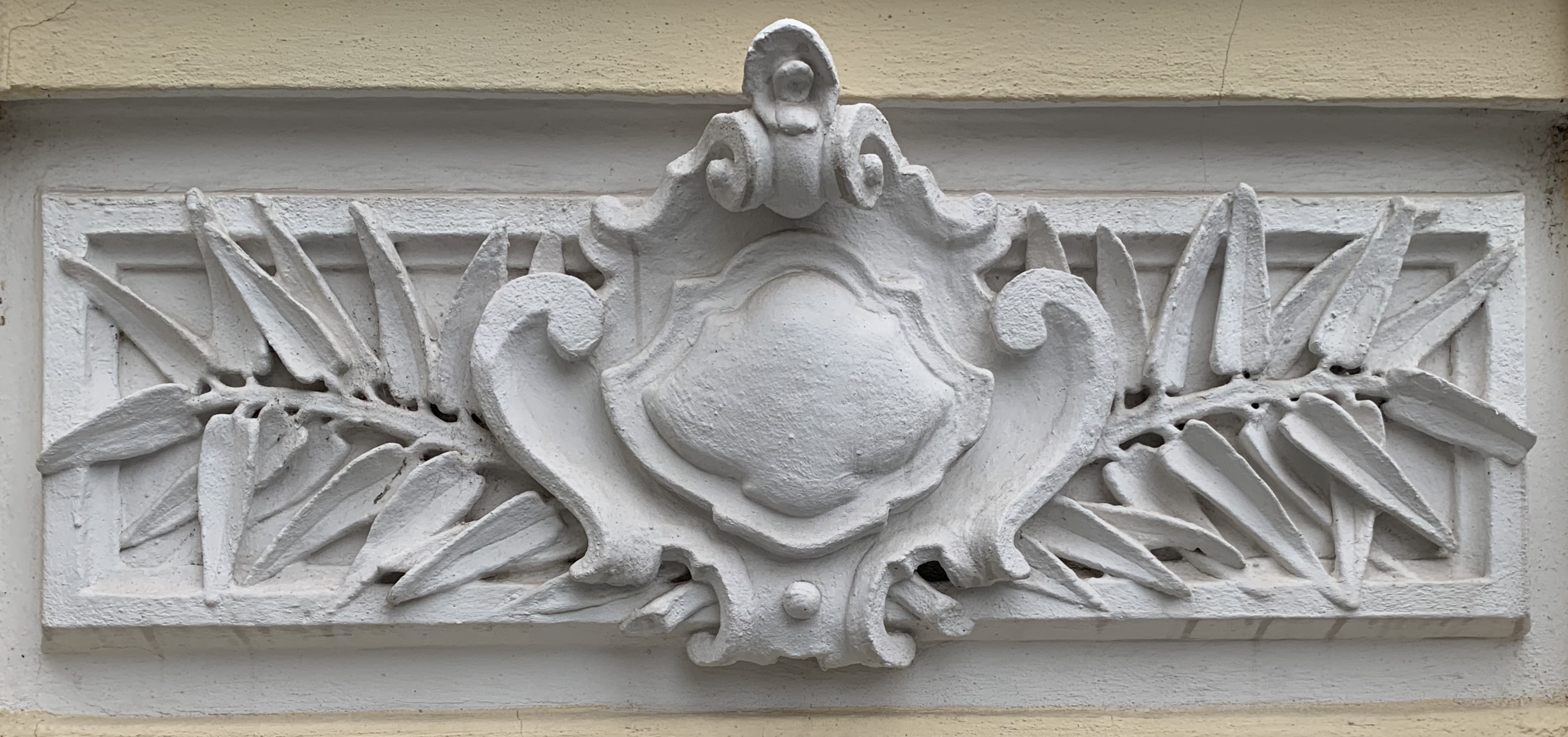
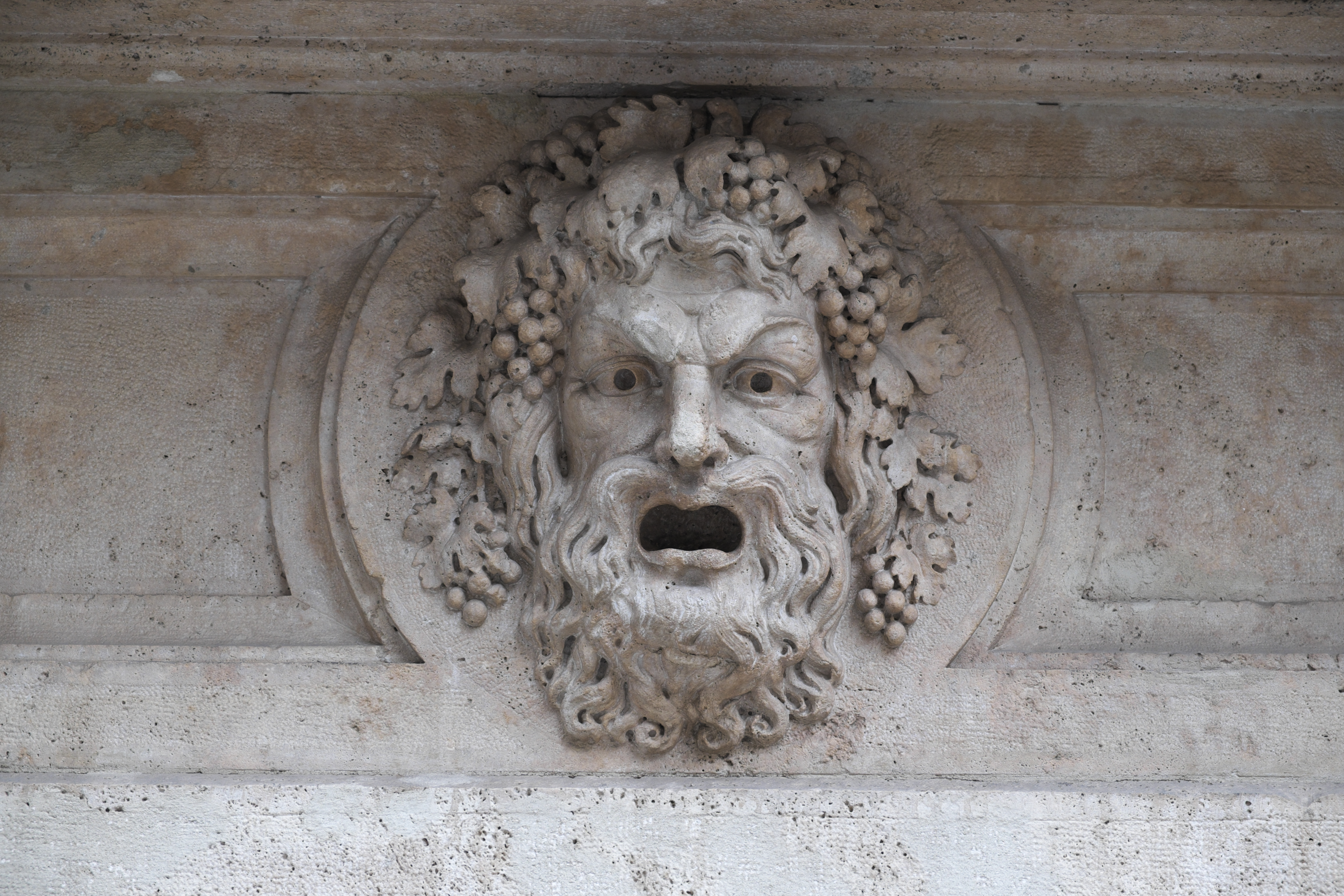
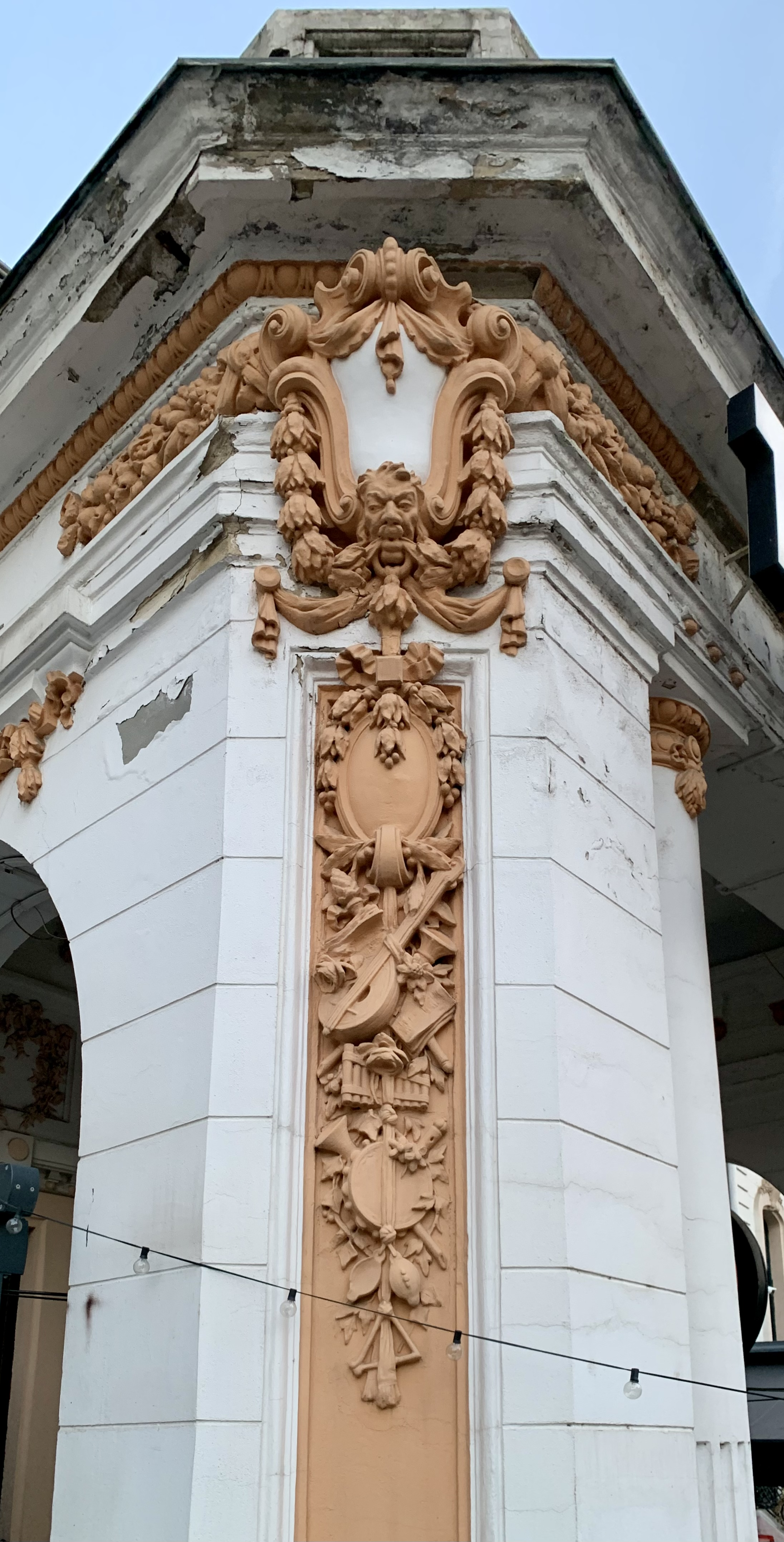
Examples of ornament in various styles. From left to right and from up to down: a festoon with a putto standing on it, an acanthus leaf, palmettes, a cartouche, a mascaron, and a trophy of musical instruments

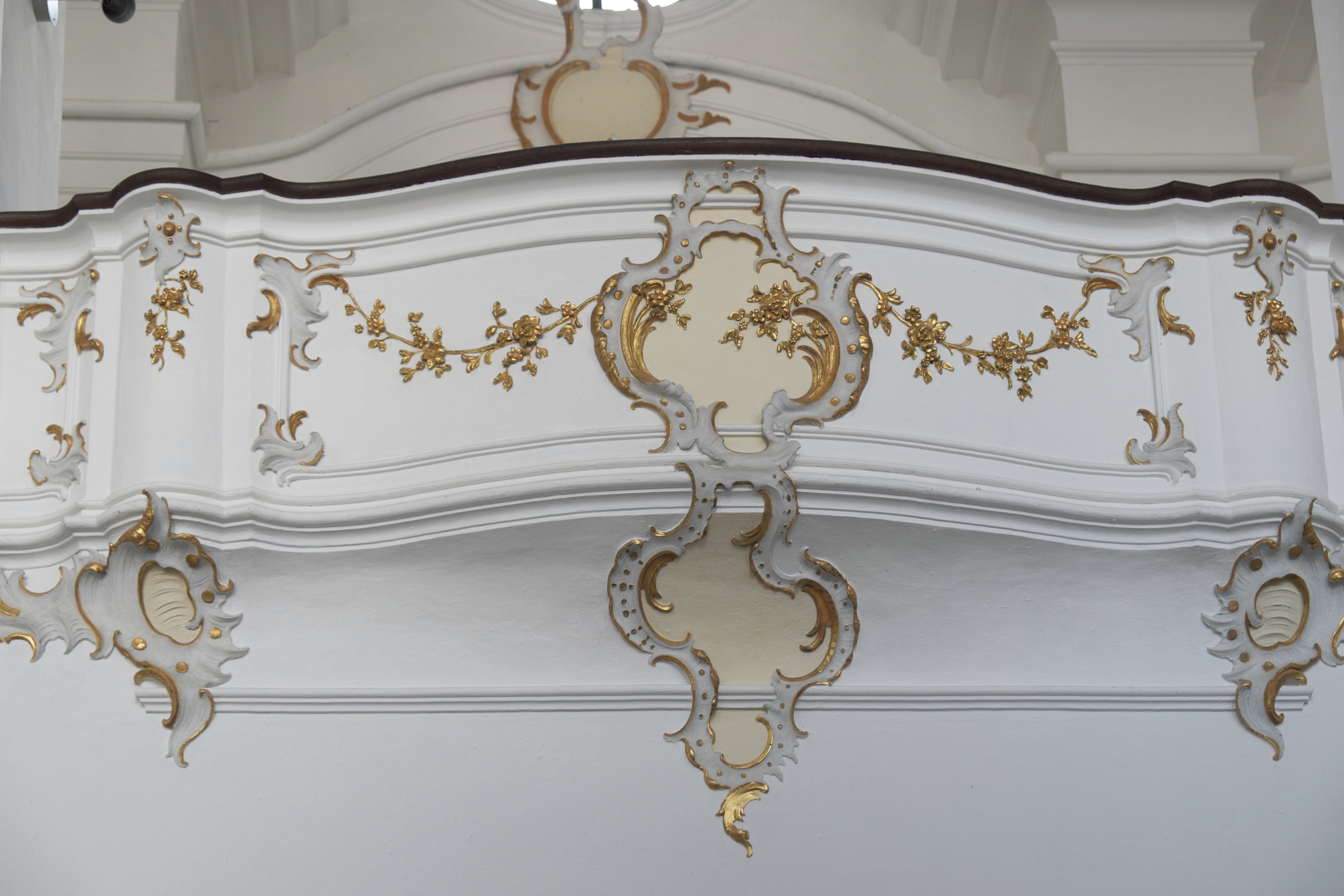
18th-century Rococo balcony, Bavaria. The form is itself ornamental, and further decorated in painted plasterwork

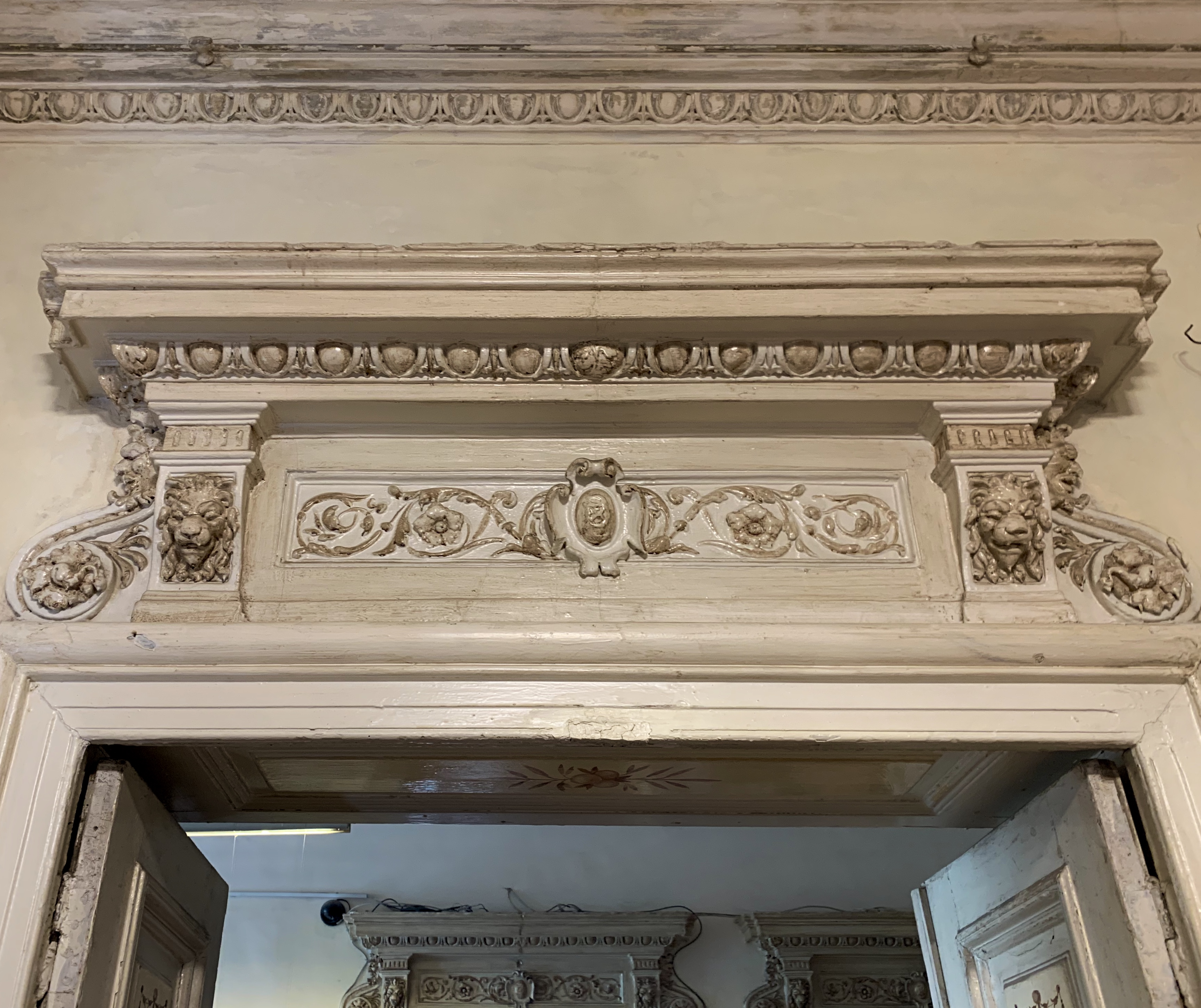
Renaissance Revival ornaments above a door in the Dimitrie Sturdza House from Bucharest (Romania), each door having the same thing above them

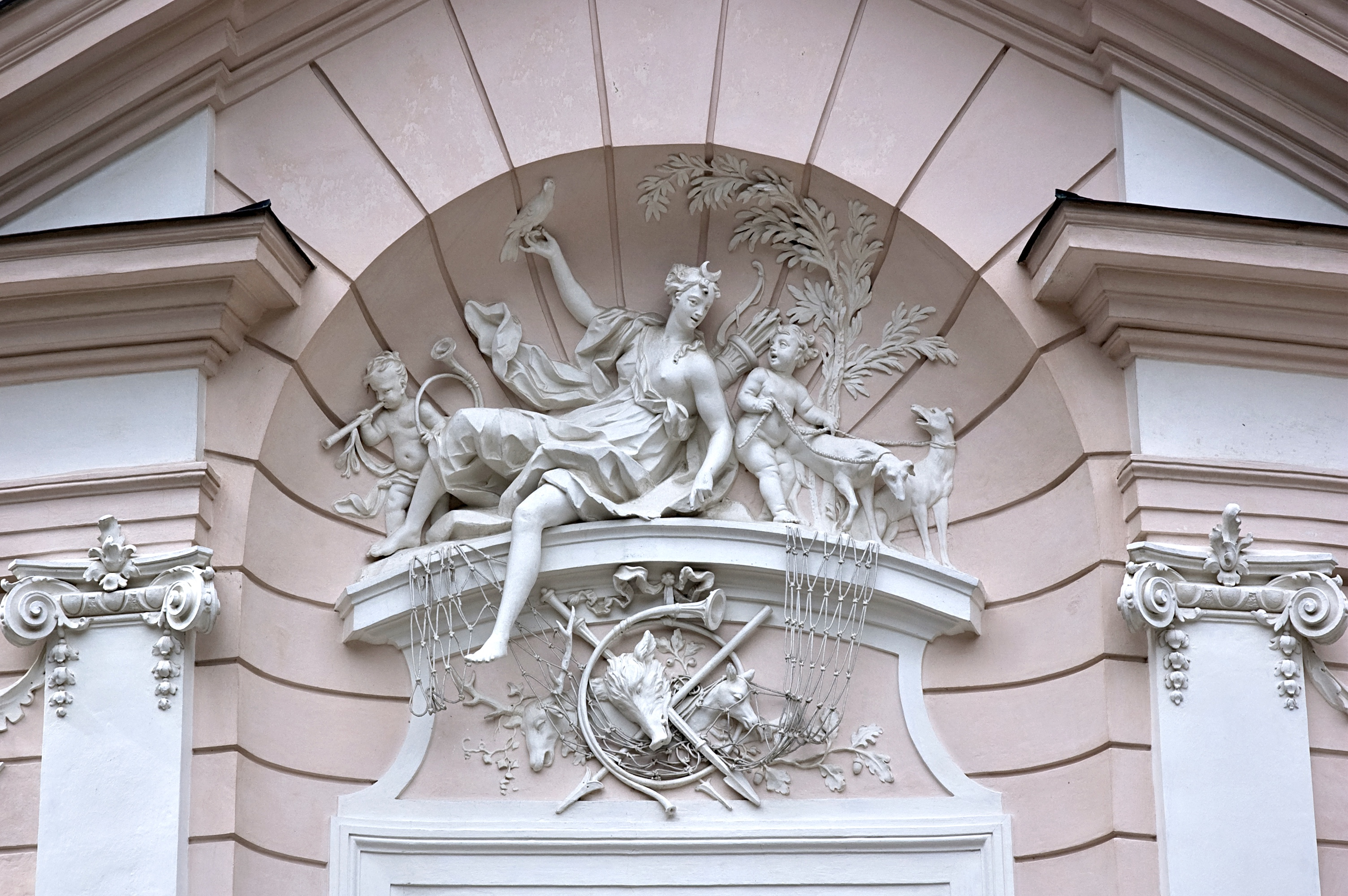
The relief of Diana at the Amalienburg, in Munich (Germany)

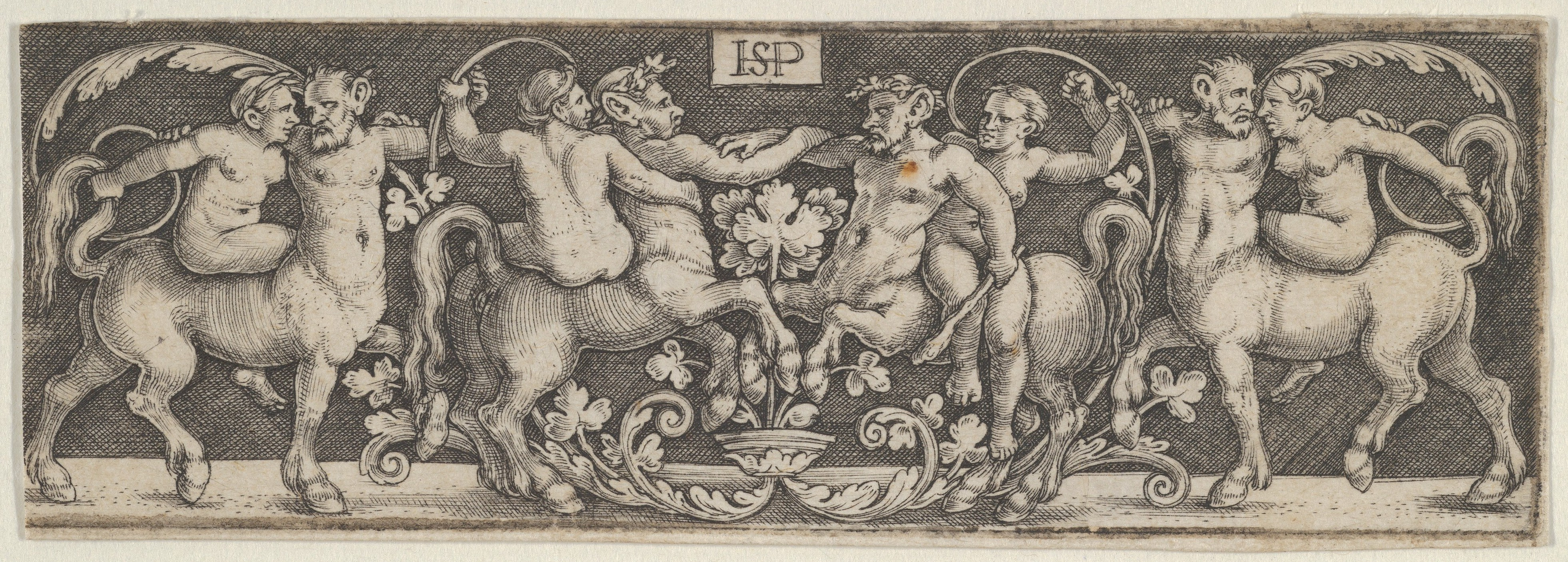
Ornament print by Sebald Beham, Centaurs fighting with mounted men

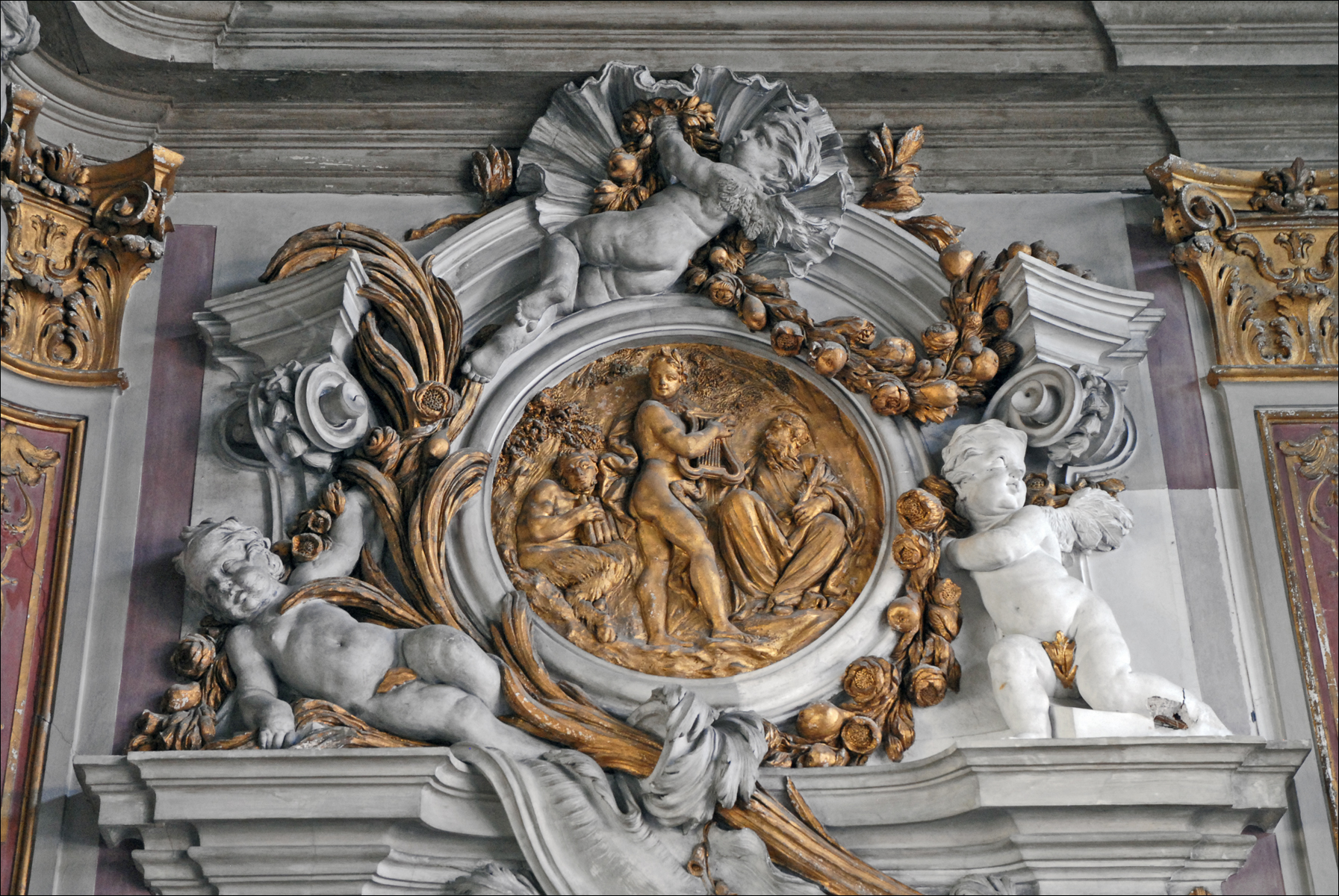
Baroque ornament in a Venetian palace

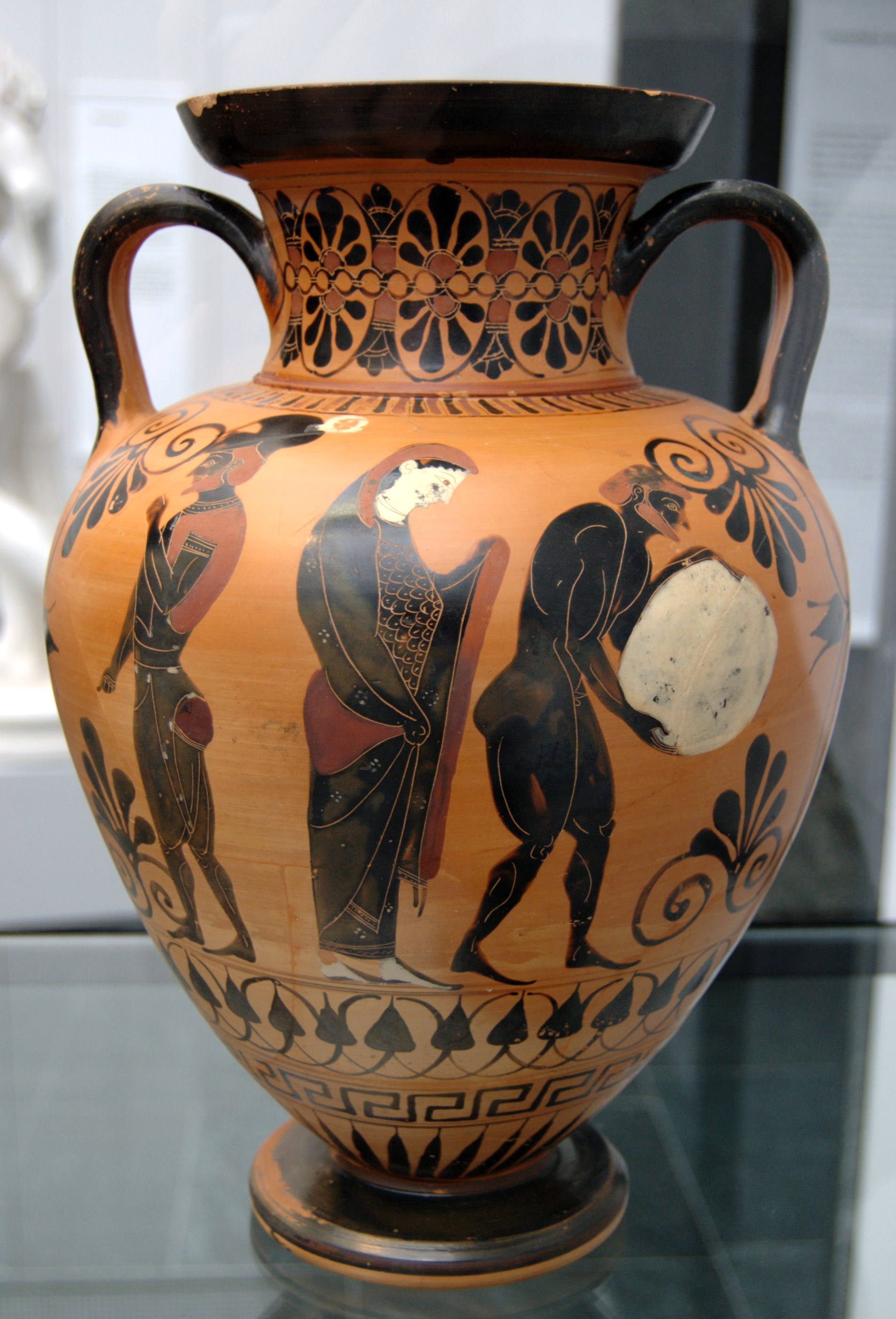
A typical variety of ornamental motifs on a Greek vase of c. 530 BC.

A few medieval notebooks survive, most famously that of Villard de Honnecourt (13th century) showing how artists and craftsmen recorded designs they saw for future use. With the arrival of the print, ornament prints became an important part of the output of printmakers, especially in Germany, and played a vital role in the rapid diffusion of new Renaissance styles to makers of all sorts of object. As well as revived classical ornament, both architectural and the grotesque style derived from Roman interior decoration, these included new styles such as the moresque, a European adaptation of the Islamic arabesque (a distinction not always clear at the time).

As printing became cheaper, the single ornament print turned into sets, and then finally books. From the 16th to the 19th century, pattern books were published in Europe which gave access to decorative elements, eventually including those recorded from cultures all over the world. Andrea Palladio's I quattro libri dell'architettura (Four Books on Architecture) (Venice, 1570), which included both drawings of classical Roman buildings and renderings of Palladio's own designs utilizing those motifs, became the most influential book ever written on architecture. Napoleon had the great pyramids and temples of Egypt documented in the Description de l'Egypte (1809). Owen Jones published The Grammar of Ornament in 1856 with colored illustrations of decoration from Egypt, Turkey, Sicily and Spain. He took residence in the Alhambra Palace to make drawings and plaster castings of the ornate details of the Islamic ornaments there, including arabesques, calligraphy, and geometric patterns. Interest in classical architecture was also fueled by the tradition of traveling on The Grand Tour, and by translation of early literature about architecture in the work of Vitruvius and Michelangelo.

During the 19th century, the acceptable use of ornament, and its precise definition became the source of aesthetic controversy in academic Western architecture, as architects and their critics searched for a suitable style. "The great question is," Thomas Leverton Donaldson asked in 1847, "are we to have an architecture of our period, a distinct, individual, palpable style of the 19th century?". In 1849, when Matthew Digby Wyatt viewed the French Industrial Exposition set up on the Champs-Elysées in Paris, he disapproved in recognizably modern terms of the plaster ornaments in faux-bronze and faux woodgrain:

Both internally and externally there is a good deal of tasteless and unprofitable ornament... If each simple material had been allowed to tell its own tale, and the lines of the construction so arranged as to conduce to a sentiment of grandeur, the qualities of "power" and "truth," which its enormous extent must have necessarily ensured, could have scarcely fail to excite admiration, and that at a very considerable saving of expense.

Contacts with other cultures through colonialism and the new discoveries of archaeology expanded the repertory of ornament available to revivalists. After about 1880, photography made details of ornament even more widely available than prints had done.

== Modern ornament ==
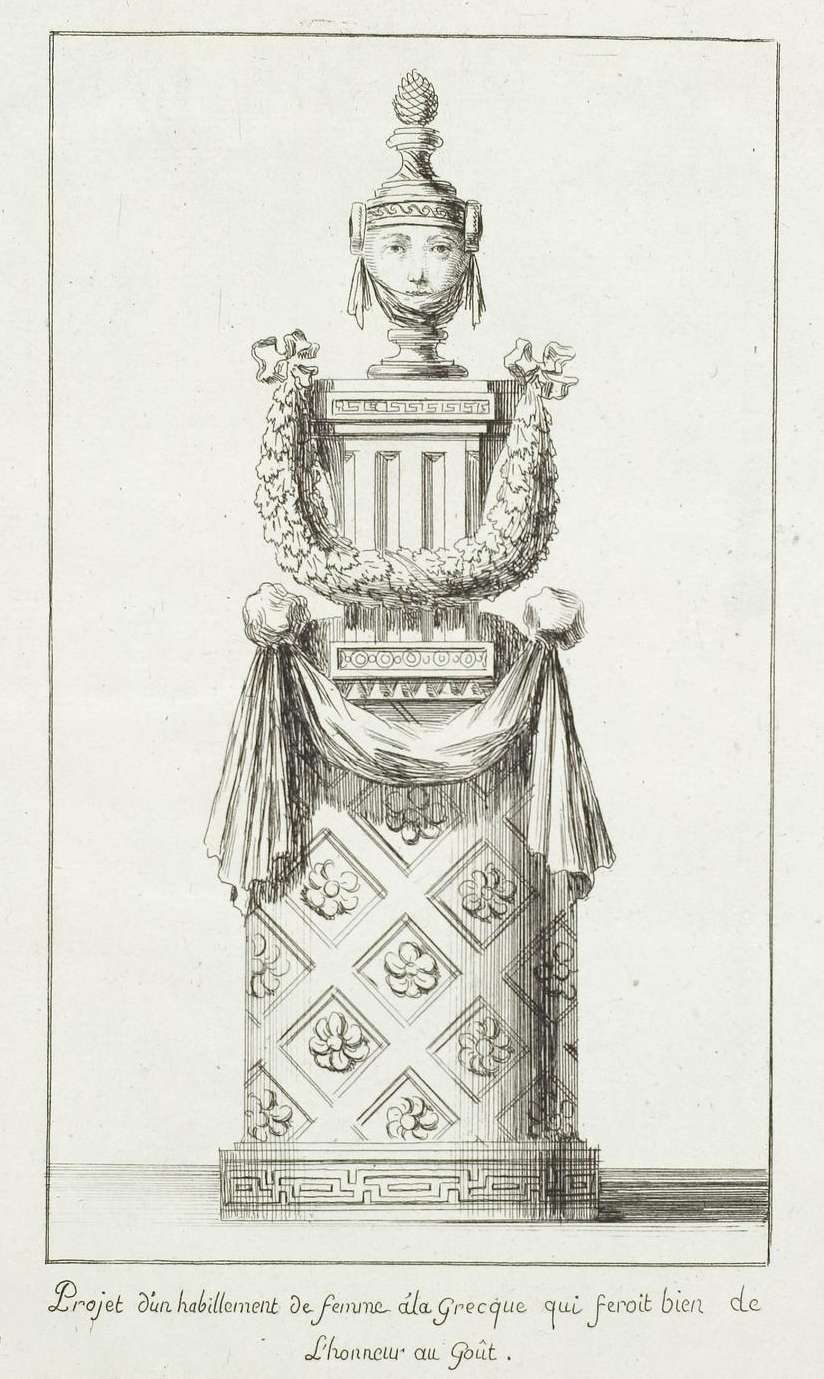
18th century illustration of a woman made of ornaments and elements of Classical architecture

Modern millwork ornaments are made of wood, plastics, composites, etc. They come in many different colours and shapes. Modern architecture, conceived of as the elimination of ornament in favor of purely functional structures, left architects the problem of how to properly adorn modern structures. There were two available routes from this perceived crisis. One was to attempt to devise an ornamental vocabulary that was new and essentially contemporary. This was the route taken by architects like Louis Sullivan and his pupil Frank Lloyd Wright, or by the unique Antoni Gaudí. Art Nouveau, popular around the turn of the 20th century, was in part a conscious effort to evolve such a "natural" vocabulary of ornament.

A more radical route abandoned the use of ornament altogether, as in some designs for objects by Christopher Dresser. At the time, such unornamented objects could have been found in many unpretending workaday items of industrial design, ceramics produced at the Arabia manufactory in Finland, for instance, or the glass insulators of electric lines.

This latter approach was described by architect Adolf Loos in his 1908 manifesto, translated into English in 1913 and polemically titled Ornament and Crime, in which he declared that lack of decoration is the sign of an advanced society. His argument was that ornament is economically inefficient and "morally degenerate", and that reducing ornament was a sign of progress. Modernists were eager to point to American architect Louis Sullivan as their godfather in the cause of aesthetic simplification, dismissing the knots of intricately patterned ornament that articulated the skin of his structures.

With the work of Le Corbusier and the Bauhaus through the 1920s and 1930s, lack of decorative detail became a hallmark of modern architecture and equated with the moral virtues of honesty, simplicity, and purity. In 1932 Philip Johnson and Henry-Russell Hitchcock dubbed this the "International Style". What began as a matter of taste was transformed into an aesthetic mandate. Modernists declared their way as the only acceptable way to build. As the style hit its stride in the highly developed postwar work of Mies van der Rohe, the tenets of 1950s modernism became so strict that even accomplished architects like Edward Durrell Stone and Eero Saarinen could be ridiculed and effectively ostracized for departing from the aesthetic rules.

At the same time, the unwritten laws against ornament began to come into serious question. "Architecture has, with some difficulty, liberated itself from ornament, but it has not liberated itself from the fear of ornament," John Summerson observed in 1941.

The very difference between ornament and structure is subtle and perhaps arbitrary. The pointed arches and flying buttresses of Gothic architecture are ornamental but structurally necessary; the colorful rhythmic bands of a Pietro Belluschi International Style skyscraper are integral, not applied, but certainly have ornamental effect. Furthermore, architectural ornament can serve the practical purpose of establishing scale, signaling entries, and aiding wayfinding, and these useful design tactics had been outlawed. And by the mid-1950s, modernist figureheads Le Corbusier and Marcel Breuer had been breaking their own rules by producing highly expressive, sculptural concrete work.

The argument against ornament peaked in 1959 over discussions of the Seagram Building, where Mies van der Rohe installed a series of structurally unnecessary vertical I-beams on the outside of the building, and by 1984, when Philip Johnson produced his AT&T Building in Manhattan with an ornamental pink granite neo-Georgian pediment, the argument was effectively over. In retrospect, critics have seen the AT&T Building as the first Postmodernist building.

== See also ==
- Applied arts
- Work of art
- Bronze and brass ornamental work
- Brocade
- Typographic ornaments: Dingbats

== 19th-century compendiums of ornament ==
- Dolmetsch, Heinrich (1898). The Treasury of Ornament. (s:de:Heinrich Dolmetsch)
- Owen Jones (1856) The Grammar of Ornament.
- Meyer, Franz Sales, (1898), A Handbook of Ornament
- Speltz, Alexander (1915). The Coloured Ornament of All Historical Styles.
