= MDRP =

MDRP may refer to:

- Medicaid Drug Rebate Program
- Men's Dress Reform Party

== See also ==
- MDRP theorem, or MRDP theorem
