= Frederick Wilding =

New Zealand cricketer

Frederick Wilding KC
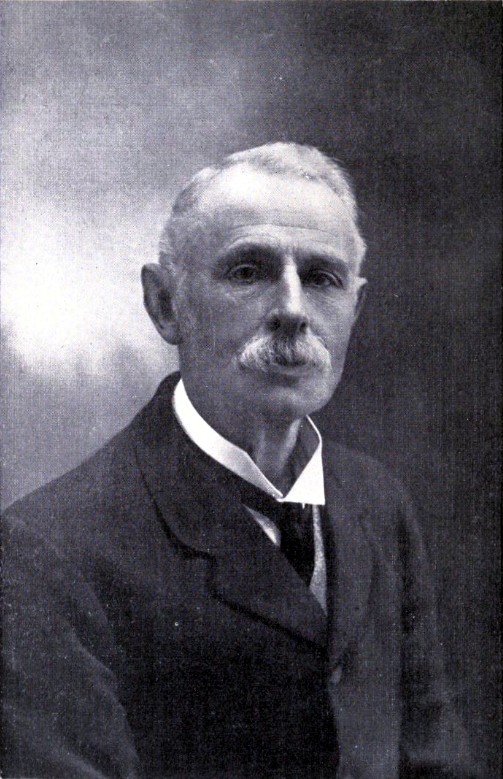

Personal information
- Born: 20 November 1852; Montgomery, Wales
- Died: 5 July 1945 (aged 92); Christchurch, New Zealand
- Batting: Right-handed
- Bowling: Slow left-arm orthodox
- Role: All-rounder
- Relatives: Anthony Wilding (son); Cora Wilding (daughter)

Domestic team information
- Years: Team
- 1881/82–1899/00: Canterbury

Career statistics
Competition	First-class
Matches	34
Runs scored	1,078
Batting average	18.91
100s/50s	2/2
Top score	103
Balls bowled	3,488
Wickets	103
Bowling average	12.79
5 wickets in innings	6
10 wickets in match	1
Best bowling	7/31
Catches/stumpings	27/–
- Source: CricketArchive, 14 November 2008

Frederick Wilding KC (20 November 1852 – 5 July 1945) played first-class cricket for Canterbury in the 1880s and 1890s. He also played tennis and was a noted athlete.

== Early life ==
Wilding was born in Montgomery, Wales in 1852. His father, John Powell Wilding (1812–1872), was a surgeon. His mother was Harriet (née Farmer). He was educated at Hereford Cathedral School in Hereford and at Shrewsbury School in Shrewsbury, England. He gained admission as a solicitor in 1874.

Wilding was prominent as an athlete in the west of England. In June 1879, he married Julia Wilding (née Anthony), the daughter of a mayor of Hereford. In the same year, they emigrated from Herefordshire to New Zealand.

== Life in New Zealand ==
Wilding became a well-to-do lawyer in Christchurch, New Zealand, and was appointed a King's Counsel in 1913. Their house, "Fownhope" in St Martins, Christchurch, had two tennis courts, an asphalt winter court and a summer grass court. He founded Wilding Park, which is today the largest tennis centre in Canterbury. He won the New Zealand Championships doubles title five times between 1887 and 1894 with his partner Richard Harman.

Their son Tony Wilding, was a world champion tennis player, and played cricket for Canterbury, but was killed in action during the First World War. Their daughter Cora Wilding was an artist and outdoor enthusiast, and founded the Youth Hostel Association of New Zealand in 1932.

He died, aged 92, in Christchurch on 5 July 1945, and was buried at Bromley Cemetery.
