= Gold Spoon Oration =

1840 political speech by Charles Ogle

The Gold Spoon Oration, also called "The Regal Splendor of the President's Palace," was a political speech given in the US House of Representatives by Charles Ogle (Whig-PA) on April 14–16, 1840. The speech reviled then-President Martin Van Buren for his supposedly luxurious lifestyle in the White House, while idealizing Whig presidential candidate William Henry Harrison as a homespun man of the people; compare the idiom "silver spoon".

Shortly after delivering the speech, Ogle had tens of thousands of copies printed and circulated around the nation as campaign literature. Historians, journalists and politicians consider it one of the premier political attacks in American history. Many also rank it as one of the most amusing speeches ever delivered in Congress.

It was claimed by the Trenton Emporium that what was published was not the speech made by Ogle. The paper claimed that the published speech was edited multiple times and stuffed with fabrications developed by other Whig Party members.

== Description ==
Ogle took the floor of the House of Representatives on April 14, 1840. For the better part of three days he addressed the House, sitting as a committee of the whole, about the "regal splendor of the President's Palace." His words over those three days would snowball into a political campaign like no other.

In the presidential campaign of 1840, Democrat Martin Van Buren, eighth president of the United States, met strong Whig opposition to his supposedly "royal lifestyle." Van Buren continued to entertain European dignitaries in an elegant manner after the collapse of the economy in 1837. Van Buren's rather dandyish style and refined tastes made him an easy target for Whig attacks. Presidential scholars have pointed out that, while Van Buren did enjoy the latest fashions from Manhattan, he purchased such personal items with money from his own pocket and spent little public money on the White House. Van Buren made needed repairs and refurbishments as well as redecorations to the presidential residence.

Ogle announced that $88,722.58 had been appropriated by Congress for the White House since the Democrats had taken control of the presidency (though only $11,806.22 was appropriated during Van Buren's term). By the second day of his speech the galleries were packed to capacity. Laughter and sarcastic comments from the floor and the galleries were common during the speech. The disruptions continued after Ogle left the floor and several other members, many of them Whigs like him, took the floor to defend the president and apologize for Ogle's behavior. However, the speech proved effective in defining Van Buren as an out-of-touch aristocrat, and Harrison was elected to the presidency in November, 1840 — only to die in office a month after his inauguration.

== Excerpts from the speech ==
An old soldier Harrison, who, to rescue thousands of women and children from the scalping knife of the ruthless savage, freely abandoned all the endearments of home and family, endured the icy and piercing blasts of northwestern winters, wading through the deep and cold waters and black swamps of Michigan and upper Canada, sustaining, at times, an almost famished nature upon raw beef, without salt, and often periling life on the field of battle? Poor simple-minded old veteran, he was, no doubt, foolish enough to believe that, having given the best energies of his body and mind in youth, manhood, and mature age, to serve and defend the honor, the rights, the property, and the lives of his fellow-citizens, he would at least, in common courtesy, be entitled to their respect, if not to their love and gratitude.

...

The survey of smooth lawns and gently sloping meads, covered with rich coats of white and red clover and luxuriant orchard grass, made no delightful impression on their eyes. No, sir; mere meadows are too common to gratify the refined taste of an exquisite with sweet sandy whiskers. He must have undulations, beautiful mounds, and other contrivances, to ravish his exalted and ethereal soul. Hence, the reformers have constructed a number of clever sized hills, every pair of which, it is said, was designed to resemble and assume the form of an Amazon's bosom, with a miniature knoll or hillock on its apex, to denote the nipple.

== Sources ==
- Ogle, Charles (1840). Speech of Mr. Ogle, of Pennsylvania, on the regal splendor of the President's palace: Delivered in the House of representatives, April 14, 1840. Boston: Weeks, Jordan and company.
- Seale, William, ed. (2004). "Gold Spoon Oration". White House History: collection 2, numbers 7 through 12. Washington, D.C.: White House Historical Association. OCLC 301761647.
- Seale, William (Winter 2002). "About the Gold Spoon Speech Oration". The Speech of Mr. Ogle of Pennsylvania on the Regal Splendor of the President's Palace. White House Historical Association. pp. 5-11, 35-97.
- Carson, Gerald (August 1964). "The Speech That Toppled A President". American Heritage. Vol. 15, no. 5.
- The Congressional Globe. Vol. 8: Twenty-Sixth Congress, First Session. Washington, D.C.: Blair & Rives. 21 April 1840. p. 327 – via UNT Digital Library.
- Seale, William (1986). The President's House: A History. White House Historical Association. ISBN 978-0-8018-8597-6. OCLC 76183665.

== See also ==
- Great Male Renunciation
