= Men's Dress Reform Party =

Reform movement in interwar Britain

The Men's Dress Reform Party (MDRP) was a reform movement in interwar Britain. While the party's main concerns were the impact of clothes on men's health and hygiene, their mission also aimed to increase the variety and choice in men's clothing.

== Background ==
The injuries and casualties of World War I shifted the public's focus to the capabilities and general health of the human body, and a general concern for the social and medical impacts of clothing grew. The New Health Society, an entity formed to effectuate change in these areas, was composed of a group of professionals led by Alfred Charles Jordan who wanted to improve the overall health of adults and children. They pushed for more exercise and fresh air, improved diets, and improved conditions in homes and workplaces. In 1927, Sir Arbuthnot Lane, a co-founder of the New Health Society, formed the Clothing Subcommittee, a subcommittee within the society focused on the health impacts of dress. On 12 June 1929 this subcommittee officially separated from the New Health Society to form the Men's Dress Reform Party through an address to the public in London, England. It read: "Men and women, old and young, rich and poor… interested in healthier and better clothes for men…[and to] reform their clothes with as much profit to health and appearance as women have recently achieved."

=== Leadership ===
Alfred Charles Jordan, Sir Arbuthnot Lane and Dr. Caleb Williams Saleeby served as the leaders of the Clothing Subcommittee and led the charge to form their own party, with Williams as the Chairman of the Council of the Party. Founding members also included the members of the former Clothing Subcommittee, the Very Revd William Ralph Inge (the Dean of St Paul's Cathedral), Guy Kendall, Richard Sickert, Ernest Thesiger, and Leonard Williams.

== Ideology ==
John Flügel, a psychologist and member of the MDRP, claimed since the end of the 18th century men had been ignoring the colorful, elaborate, and varied forms of "masculine ornamentation." He called this time the Great Masculine Renunciation. "Man," Flügel claimed, had "abandoned his claim to be considered beautiful. He henceforth aimed at only being useful." This view aligned with that of founding member of the Men's Dress Reform Party, William Ralph Inge. Inge believed that the democratic movements of the French Revolution had led to the increasingly dull male look: "to escape the guillotine, dress as bourgeois as possible." The party's goals were largely reactions to circumstances brought on by World War I. They saw the everyday man as "oppressed by capitalist labor" and saw his clothes as "depressing" and lacking in creativity. The military-style uniformity of the interwar period had created a culture of men who were happy to see others dressed like them, as opposed to seeing those who craved individuality. World War I also brought increased unemployment, which caused state intervention, which the Men's Dress Reform Party saw as the "oppression of professionals". Lastly, the status of women in society was changing. Feminism was developing in the interwar period, as women had taken over for men during World War I in jobs, schools, and social life. This threatened men, causing some to feel "like accessories to women". The MDRP sought to improve the health and hygiene of men by changing their dress, as they saw the typical male styles and materials growing more restrictive and harmful, while women's clothing was increasingly becoming more "emanicipating" Their goals included "freeing the neck" by wearing the "Byron collar" which was an open-front collar, and gaining approval of the kilt as everyday wear for men. They also preferred blouses instead of shirts, sandals over shoes, and shorts or breeches to trousers. The party felt that hats and coats were only acceptable in appropriate weather, and that underclothing should be loose. Most of these rules were already acceptable for occasions such as vacation, but the party looked to make these the standard for town, professional, and evening dress.

=== 1929–1937 ===
Unlike other organizations of the time, the MDRP had no formal journal. Instead, the group published articles about their reform ideas in Sunlight, a quarterly journal produced by The Sunlight League. MDRP member Dr. Caleb Saleeby chaired the Sunlight League, and thus incurred the league's support of the Men's Dress Reform Party. A Design Committee was organized to construct designs of "acceptable" clothing, and received national attention for their recommendations. Members claimed that branches were forming in all corners of the world, including India, China, Australia, South Africa, the USA, New Zealand, Canada, and Europe in addition to the approximately 200 branches in the UK. These groups held social events, rallies, and debates, but the prevalence of such events decreased with the onset of World War II. In 1937, the Men's Dress Reform Party lost the support of the New Health Society due to financial trouble and eventual bankruptcy. Then, in 1940, the Sunlight League also dissipated after a bomb destroyed their offices and the death of its founder, Dr. Saleeby. After this period, the Men's Dress Reform Party largely ceased to exist.
