= Cora Wilding =

New Zealand physiotherapist (1888–1982)

Cora Wilding MBE
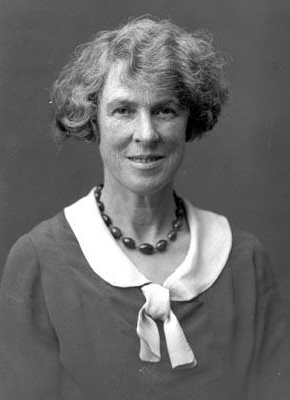
- Wilding, c. 1935
- Born: 15 November 1888; Christchurch, New Zealand
- Died: 8 October 1982 (aged 93); Kaikōura, New Zealand
- Occupations: Physiotherapist; artist
- Known for: Advocacy of outdoor activities and children's health camps
- Relatives: Frederick Wilding (father); Anthony Wilding (brother)

Cora Hilda Blanche Wilding MBE (15 November 1888 – 8 October 1982) was a New Zealand physiotherapist and artist, remembered for her advocacy of outdoor activities and children’s health camps in the 1930s.

Wilding was an advocate for eugenics, and promoted personal health so that the individual would have not only increased happiness, but increased capacity for "service to the community." She was instrumental in the founding of The Sunlight League in 1930, for which she held fundraising garden parties at "Fownhope", the Wilding family home in St Martins, Christchurch, and also the Youth Hostel Association of New Zealand in 1932. She had trained as a physiotherapist in Dunedin during World War I, and been introduced to youth hostels during her extensive European travels in the 1920s when she painted and studied outdoor activities.

Born in Christchurch, Wilding was the daughter of Frederick and Julia Wilding, and a sister of tennis player Anthony Wilding. Her father was a lawyer, and an athlete and cricket and tennis player. She was educated at Christchurch Girls' High School, and then Nelson College for Girls, where she was captain of the hockey team and school tennis champion.

Wilding retired as a physiotherapist in 1948, and moved from Christchurch to Kaikōura, where she painted for many years. She was made a patron of the Youth Hostel Association of New Zealand in 1938 and a life member in 1968. In the 1952 New Year Honours, she was appointed a Member of the Order of the British Empire, for social welfare services. The first Christchurch youth hostel (1965–1997), formerly the Avebury House, was called the "Cora Wilding Youth Hostel" in her honour.

Wilding died in Kaikōura on 8 October 1982, at the age of 93.
