= Youth Hostel Association of New Zealand =

Hostelling association

The Youth Hostel Association of New Zealand (YHA New Zealand or YHA NZ) was a youth hostelling association in New Zealand. It owned some hostels, with others privately owned by franchise partners or associate partners. The national office was in Christchurch.

With the impact of the world-wide COVID-19 pandemic, which started in 2020, many of the franchisees and associates stepped back from operating hostels, including some who sold their properties. In November 2021, YHA NZ said it would close the remaining 11 hostels it owned on 15 December, due largely to COVID pandemic-related financial losses, but 23 individually owned hostels would continue to operate – these included Ahipara, Paihia, Bay of Islands, National Park, Taupō, Waitomo, Whanganui, Whangārei, Arthur's Pass, Golden Bay, Hanmer Springs, Kinloch, Nelson, Picton, Punakaiki, Springfield and Westport. In 2022 YHA sold its five remaining hostels (Auckland, Aoraki / Mount Cook, Franz Josef, Queenstown Lakefront and Te Anau), and four hostels previously sold to RPZ in 2021 and leased back to manage were also on-sold to Gaw Capital Holdings Limited (Rotorua, Wellington, Lake Tekapo and Wānaka). Eight of them rejoined as YHA Associates, only Te Anau not keeping the YHA logo. The lease of Christchurch Hereford St was also taken over by Gaw in 2022. The hostels were then refurbished and rebranded Haka House.

YHA NZ went into liquidation at the end of 2024, though its website continues with links to five: Nelson and Westport on the South Island; Taupō, Waitomo and Whanganui on the North Island.

== History ==
The Sunlight League was formed in 1931 in New Zealand and their attention was drawn to German youth hostels later that year; youth hostels had begun in Altena in 1912. The first ones in the Southern Hemisphere were those of the Youth Hostel Association of New Zealand, after its formation on 8 April 1932, at a meeting of nine Canterbury tramping organisations brought together by the League and chaired by Sir Arthur Dudley Dobson. Sir Arthur was elected as President and vice-presidents included Sir Heaton Rhodes and Professors Arnold Wall and Macmillan Brown. Cora Wilding had negotiated for trampers belonging to the clubs forming the Association to stay at nearby Le Bon's Bay, Port Levy, Pigeon's Bay, Okain's Bay, Akaroa, Duvauchelle, and Hill Top, all on Banks Peninsula. Teddington and Diamond Harbour were added, also in 1932.

The association was a member of Hostelling International from 1946. It had 895 members by 1953. A national council was created in 1955. In 1965 there were 39 hostels and 7000 members. In 1983 there were 47 hostels, 6,700 life members and 21,000 ordinary members. As of April 2001, there were 57 hostels in the YHA NZ system, including three in Auckland and two in Christchurch – the two largest urban areas in New Zealand.

Celebrating its 75th anniversary in 2007, Governor-General Sir Anand Satyanand described YHA NZ as a "standout New Zealand organisation" and "such an iconic feature of holidaying in New Zealand". The hostel in Wellington won the Hostelworld "Hoscar" prize for Best Hostel in Oceania in 2007 and 2008. In 2009 the hostel in Rotorua won the award.

== Current YHA NZ hostels ==
This is a list of current YHA NZ hostels. This section was up to date in March 2024.

| Name | Image | Region | Year opened |
|---|---|---|---|
| Aoraki Mt Cook | Haka House, 4 Kitchener Drive | Canterbury | 1958 replaced in 1987 Closed 15 December 2021, reopened December 2022 |
| Auckland International | Auckland International YHA in 2015 Haka House, Turner St | Auckland | refurbished 2018 Closed 15 December 2021, reopened December 2022. |
| Auckland K'Road | 373 Karangahape Road | Auckland | |
| Christchurch | Christchurch without a YHA sign in 2024 Haka House, 36 Hereford Street | Canterbury | Closed 15 December 2021, reopened December 2022. |
| Franz Josef | YHA Franz Josef in 2017 Haka House 2-4 Cron Street | West Coast | 1980 Closed 15 December 2021, reopened December 2022 |
| Hanmer Springs | Kakapo Lodge, 14 Amuri Avenue | Canterbury | |
| Lake Tekapo | Haka House, 5 Motuariki Lane | Canterbury | Closed 15 December 2021, reopened 18 November 2022 |
| Nelson | 59 Rutherford Street | Nelson | |
| Paihia, Bay Of Islands | Level 2/ 76 Marsden Road | Northland | |
| Queenstown | 6 Henry Street | Otago | |
| Queenstown Lakefront | YHA Queenstown Lakeside in 2017 88-90 Lake Esplanade | Otago | 1972 Closed 15 December 2021, reopened December 2022 |
| Rotorua | YHA Rotorua in 2013 Haka House, 1278 Haupapa St | Bay of Plenty | 2008 Closed 15 December 2021, reopened December 2022. |
| Taupō | Finlay Jacks, 20 Taniwha Street | Waikato | 1984 |
| Waitomo | Juno Hall, 600 Waitomo Caves Road | Waikato | |
| Wānaka | 94 Brownston Street | Otago | 2009 Closed 15 December 2021, reopened 19 December 2022. |
| Wellington | 292 Wakefield Street | Wellington | Closed 15 December 2021, reopened December 2022. |
| Westport | Westport YHA Trip Inn, 72 Queen Street | West Coast | |
| Whanganui | Braemar House YHA, Whanganui | Manawatū-Whanganui | |

== Former hostels ==
This section lists the locations of former YHA NZ hostels.

| Name | Image | Region | Opened | Closed |
|---|---|---|---|---|
| Ahipara | | Northland | | Ahipara was still affiliated to YHA in November 2021 |
| Arthur's Pass | Arthurs Pass YHA | Canterbury | 1955 replacing 1948 hostel | 2023 |
| Bay of Islands, The Rock | | Northland | cruise boat | The Rock Adventure Cruise was still affiliated to YHA in November 2021 |
| Golden Bay (Tākaka) | | Tasman | | Golden Bay, Annies Nirvana Lodge was still affiliated to YHA in November 2021 |
| Cora Wilding, Christchurch | | Canterbury | 1966 | 1997 |
| Rolleston House, Christchurch | Rolleston House YHA | Canterbury | 1974 | 2020 |
| City Road, Auckland | Auckland City Road YHA in 2010 | Auckland | 1990, refurbished 2016 | |
| 71 Stafford Street, Dunedin | | Otago | 1969 replaced 1980 | listed 1986 |
| Gisborne | | Gisborne | 1974 | Gisborne was still affiliated to YHA in November 2021 |
| 1190 Victoria Street, Hamilton | | Waikato | 1961, replaced 1981 | 2006 to 2013 |
| Hokitika | | West Coast | | Hokitika, Birdsong Backpackers was still affiliated to YHA in November 2021 |
| Kinloch, Glenorchy | | Otago | | Kinloch, Wilderness Retreat was still affiliated to YHA in November 2021 |
| Montgomery, Hill Top | | Canterbury | 1957 | |
| Napier | Napier YHA in 2018 | Hawke's Bay | 1984 | |
| National Park | | Manawatū-Whanganui | | Backpackers still affiliated to YHA in November 2021 |
| 42 Weka Street, Nelson | | Nelson | 1981 | after 2010 |
| New Plymouth | | Taranaki | | New Plymouth, Sunflower Lodge was still affiliated to YHA in November 2021 |
| Ōkārito | | West Coast | 1958 | 1990 |
| Kukupa, Pigeon Bay | | Canterbury | 1952 | 1995 |
| Paihia | | Northland | | Paihia was still affiliated to YHA in November 2021 |
| Picton | | Marlborough | | The Villa was still affiliated to YHA in November 2021 |
| Punakaiki | | West Coast | | Punakaiki, Te Nikau Retreat was still affiliated to YHA in November 2021 |
| Queenstown Central | | Otago | | Closed 15 December 2021, lease not renewed |
| Raglan | Solscape, YHA Raglan in 2016 | Waikato | during 2010s | |
| Springfield | | Canterbury | | Springfield, Smylies was still affiliated to YHA in November 2021 |
| Te Anau | | Southland | 1961 replaced 1977 and again since | Closed 15 December 2021, sold in 2022 for staff accommodation |
| Trout Stream, Cooper’s Creek | | Canterbury | 1948 now derelict | |
| Whangārei | | Northland | | Whangārei Falls Holiday Park was still affiliated to YHA in November 2021 Closed 2022 |
