= The Sunlight League =

The Sunlight League was founded in England in 1924 by C. W. Saleeby. Its aim was: "to point to the light of day, to advocate its use for the cure of disease—"helio-therapy"; and, immeasurably better, for preventive medicine and constructive health, the building of whole and happy bodies from the cradle and before it, which we may call helio-hygiene".

The League was closely associated with the Men's Dress Reform Party. It was also an early campaigner against air pollution from coal smoke. Although the Sunlight League did not overtly promote nudism Saleeby did confide to friends that the idea behind it was to stimulate the nudist movement.

The League was dissolved in 1940, following after a bomb destroyed their offices and the death of its founder, Dr. Saleeby.

== New Zealand ==
Cora Wilding founded a Sunlight League in New Zealand in 1930 on the lines of the League in England and the New Health Society. C. W. Saleeby was a member of the original Council. The League had its inaugural public meeting in Christchurch on 14 May 1931.
