= Caleb Saleeby =

English physician and writer (1878–1940)

Caleb Williams Saleeby
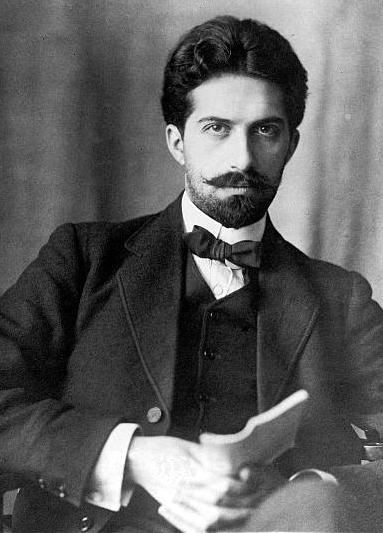
- Saleeby c. 1918
- Born: 1878; Sussex, England
- Died: 9 December 1940 (aged 62); Apple Tree, Aldbury, Hertfordshire, England
- Education: Edinburgh University
- Years active: 1904–1940
- Known for: Eugenics
- Spouse: Monica Meynell (1903–1910)
- Medical career
- Profession: Doctor, writer, journalist
- Institutions: Royal Infirmary of Edinburgh
- Sub-specialties: Obstetrics

Caleb Williams Saleeby FRSE (1878 – 9 December 1940) was an English physician, writer, and journalist known for his support of eugenics. During World War I, he was an adviser to the Minister of Food and advocated the establishment of a Ministry of Health.

== Life ==
Saleeby was born in Sussex to a Lebanese Christian father and an English mother. His father, Elias G. Saleeby, was a founder and head of schools in Mount Lebanon. From his mother's side he was the grandson of the famous psychiatrist Caleb Williams of York. His father died whilst he was young and his mother moved to 3 Malta Terrace in Stockbridge, Edinburgh. He was educated by his mother and at the Royal High School in Edinburgh.

At Edinburgh University, he took First Class Honours and was an Ettles Scholar and Scott Scholar in Obstetrics. In 1904, he received his Doctor of Medicine degree. He was a resident at the Maternity Hospital and the Royal Infirmary of Edinburgh, and briefly at the York City Dispensary.

In 1906 he was elected a Fellow of the Royal Society of Edinburgh. His proposers were Sir Alexander Russell Simpson, Sir Thomas Clouston, Sir William Turner and Daniel John Cunningham.

He became a prolific freelance writer and journalist, with strong views on many subjects. He became known in particular as an advocate of eugenics: in 1907 he was influential in launching the Eugenics Education Society, and in 1909 he published (in New York) Parenthood and Race Culture.

He was a contributor to the first edition of Arthur Mee's The Children's Encyclopædia. Like Mee, he was a keen temperance reformer. Saleeby's contributions to the Encyclopedia were explicitly racialist: he saw mankind as the pinnacle of evolution, and white men as superior to other men, based on "craniometry".

He predicted the use of atomic power, "perhaps not for hundreds of years". He favoured the education of women, but primarily so they should become better mothers. In Woman and Womanhood (1912), he wrote: "Women, being constructed by Nature, as individuals, for her racial ends, are happier and more beautiful, live longer and more beautiful lives, when they follow, as mothers or foster-mothers the role of motherhood". Yet, at this time when the suffragette movement was at its peak, he also wrote that he could see no good reason against the vote for women: "I believe in the vote; I believe it will be eugenic".

During World War I, he was an adviser to the Minister of Food and argued in favour of the establishment of a Ministry of Health. Later, he moved away from eugenics, and did not publish any further writings on this subject after 1921—though he continued to write on health matters in particular. He also campaigned for clean air and the benefits of sunlight, founding The Sunlight League in 1924. Although the Sunlight League did not overtly promote nudism Saleeby did confide to friends that the idea behind it was to stimulate the nudist movement. Saleeby founded a nudist club in Britain in the 1920s exhorting the nudist lifestyle in his book Sunlight and Health.

He died on 9 December 1940 from heart failure at Apple Tree, Aldbury, near Tring.

== Cancer research ==
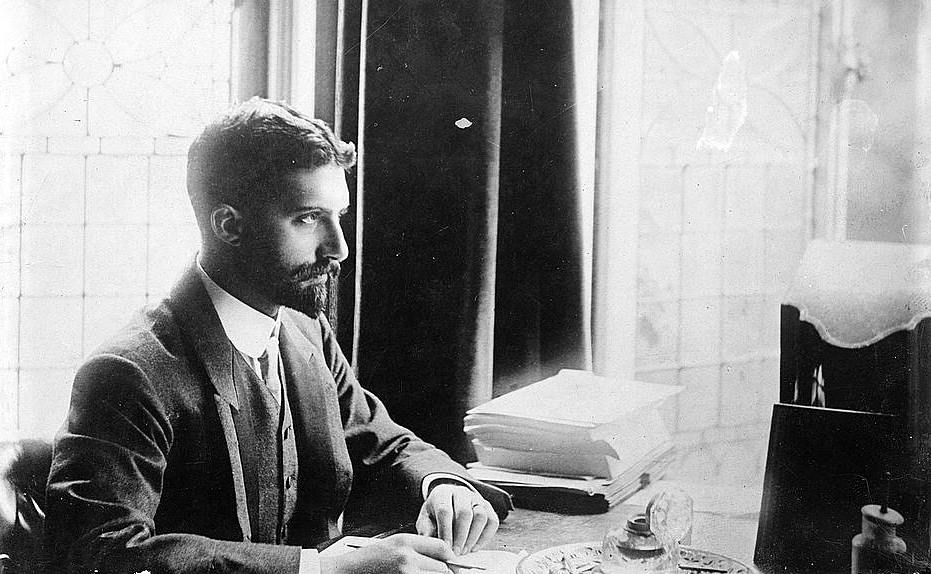
Saleeby c. 1910

Saleeby was a proponent of the trophoblastic theory of cancer first proposed by embryologist John Beard. He authored the book The Conquest of Cancer, in 1908.

== Family ==
He married Monica Meynell, daughter of Alice Meynell and Wilfrid Meynell, in June 1903. They had two daughters, Mary and Cordelia.

In 1910, his marriage fell apart after his wife had a nervous breakdown. During this time, their daughter Mary, was sent to live with Viola Meynell. D.H. Lawrence was living at her family's cottage in Sussex. He became Mary's tutor.

In 1930 he married Muriel Gordon Billings.

== Selected works ==
- Cycle of Life According to Modern Science (1904)
- The Conquest of Cancer (1907)
- Worry the Disease of the Age (1907)
- Health, Strength and Happiness (1908)
- Parenthood and Race Culture (1909)
- The Methods of Race-Regeneration (1911)
- Woman and Womanhood (1911)
- The Progress of Eugenics (1914)
- Sunlight and Health (1st ed 1923. 5th ed 1929)

== See also ==
- Lizzy Lind af Hageby
