= Great Male Renunciation =

Turning point in men's fashion

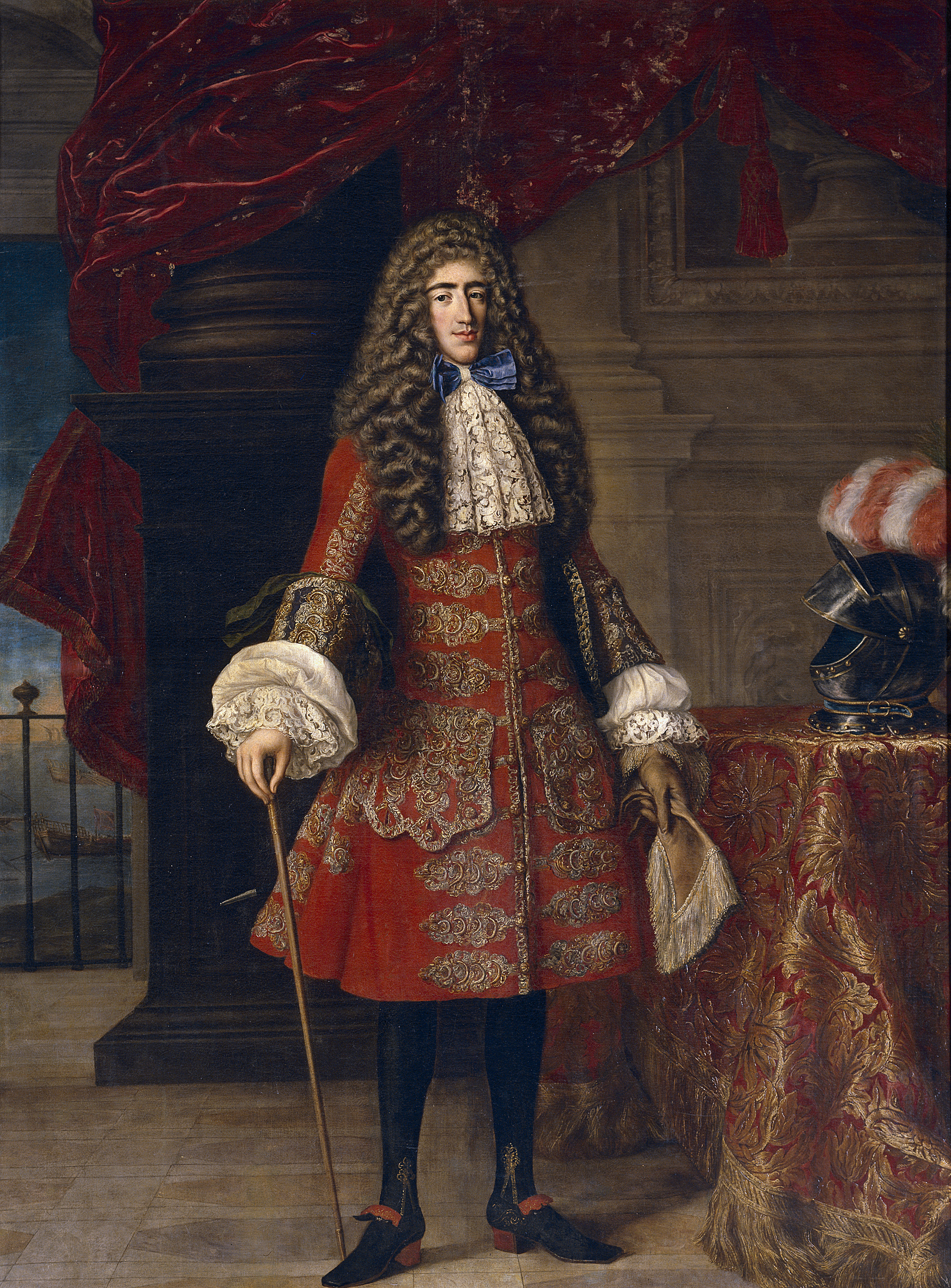
Luis Francisco de la Cerda a Spanish nobleman in a lavish red justacorps, c. 1684. Painted by Jacob Ferdinand Voet.

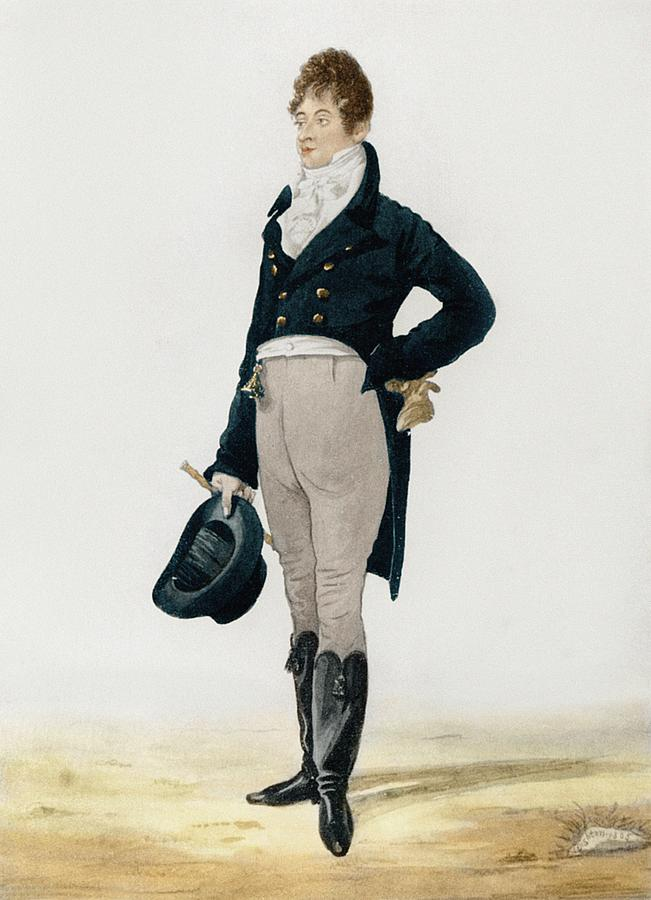
Beau Brummell wearing a subdued color palette of white, black, navy blue, and buff; watercolor by Richard Dighton (1805)

The Great Male Renunciation (French: Grande Renonciation masculine) is the historical phenomenon at the end of the 18th century in which wealthy men of the Western world ceased from using bright colours, elaborate shapes and variety in their dress, and reserved these aspects to women's clothing. Instead, men concentrated on differences of cut and the quality of the clothes' fabric.

Coined by British psychologist John Flügel in 1930, it is considered a major turning point in the history of clothing where the male style stopped being as ornate and detailed. Flügel asserted that men "abandoned their claim to be considered beautiful" and "henceforth aimed at being only useful". The Great Renunciation encouraged the establishment of the suit's monopoly on male dress codes at the beginning of the 19th century.

== History ==
The Great Male Renunciation began in the mid-18th century, inspired by the ideals of the Enlightenment; clothing that signaled aristocratic status fell out of style in favour of functional, utilitarian garments.

During the French Revolution, wearing dress associated with the royalist Ancien Régime made the wearer a target for the Jacobins. Working-class men of the era, many of whom were Revolutionaries, came to be known as sans-culottes because they could not afford silk breeches and wore less expensive pantaloons instead. The term was first used as an insult by French officer Jean-Bernard Gauthier de Murnan but was reclaimed by these men around the time of the Demonstration of 20 June 1792.

In the United States, the movement was associated with American republicanism, with Benjamin Franklin giving up his wig during the American Revolution, and later Charles Ogle's Gold Spoon Oration of 1840 denouncing Martin Van Buren.

The post-Renunciation standards for men's dress went largely unchallenged in the Western world before the rise of the counterculture and increased informality in the 1960s (see 1960s in fashion).

== Characteristics ==
Dark-coloured or black clothing became the standard for men's apparel during the Renunciation. High heels, adopted in Europe at the beginning of the 17th century based on Persian riding shoes, fell out of fashion for men by the 1740s. The tight-fitting breeches that suggested better tailoring and accentuated the strength of the male figure, particularly the legs, were replaced by pantaloons. Stockings and expensive wigs and fabrics were also abandoned.

== See also ==
- 1775–1795 in Western fashion
- Beau Brummell
- Men's Dress Reform Party
- Midnight blue, a colour popularised by the Duke of Windsor as an alternative to black clothing
- Black tie
- Peacock revolution
